= James Kānehoa =

American politician (1797–1851)

James Young Kānehoa
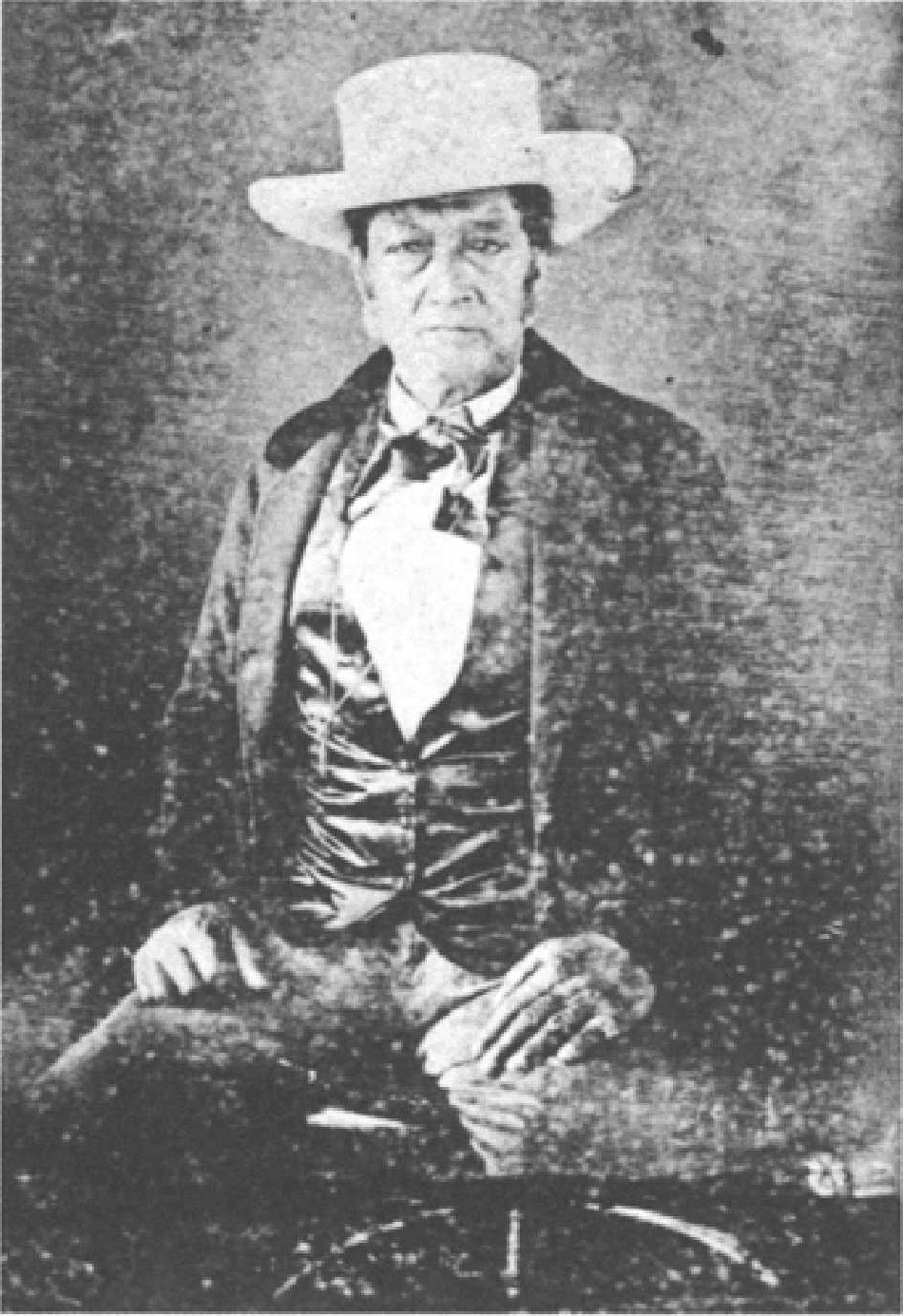
- Born: August 7, 1797; Kawaihae, Hawaii
- Died: October 1, 1851 (aged 54); Honolulu, Oahu
- Burial: October 4, 1851; Pohukaina Tomb
- Spouse: Sarah Kaniaulono Davis; Haale; Hikoni
- Issue: Jane Lahilahi Kānehoa Young; Alebada Keliimaikai Kaeo; Kailio
Names
- James Kānehoa Young
- Father: John Young Olohana
- Mother: Namokuelua

James Young Kānehoa (August 7, 1797 – October 1, 1851) was a member of the court of King Kamehameha II and Kamehameha III during the Kingdom of Hawaii. Sometimes he is confused with his half-brother John Kalaipaihala Young II known as Keoni Ana.

== Life ==
He was born August 7, 1797, at Kawaihae, Hawaii. His father was John Young who was the British advisor of Kamehameha I. Kānehoa was Young's second son by his first wife, the chiefess Namokuelua of Oahu aristocracy. His mother was of chiefly rank, though not high. Kānehoa had an elder brother named Robert Young, born in 1796. His father had four children from another wife named Kaʻōanaʻeha who was the niece of Kamehameha I. His half-siblings were Fanny Kekela, Grace Kamaikui, Jane Lahilahi, and John Kalaipaihala.

He left Hawaii at a young age, perhaps at the age of nine. He was sent to the United States to be educated along with his brother Robert. Robert would join the US Army and die in the War of 1812. He became a merchant mariner like his father; for many years he sailed between Philadelphia, his home port, and England. Eventually, his experience abroad and his fluency in English led to recognition by Kamehameha II when Kānehoa returned to Hawaii. Kānehoa was entrusted with the official letters of introduction and served as translator. Kamehameha II, his queen and three other chiefs contracted the measles and died abroad. He survived and served as the official interpreter for High Chief Boki, the new leader of the royal party, when he met King George IV. Kānehoa accompanied the bodies of his king and queen back to Honolulu aboard HMS Blonde in 1825.

He served as a member of the House of Nobles during Kamehameha III's reign from 1845 to 1851. From 1846 he was a member of the first Board of Land Commissioners under Kamehameha III. Other members were William Richards, John Ricord, John Papa ʻĪʻī, and Zorobabela Kaʻauwai. Their duties were to settle or quiet land claims during the Great Mahele. He also was the governor of Maui 1842–1851 when he had to deal with a smallpox epidemic. In later life, he attitude was one of melancholy. He died October 1, 1851, not long after his stepmother Kaʻōanaʻeha. In his last illness, he was a patient at Rooke House, the place so connected with the Young family. After his funeral, his remains were deposited at the Pohukaina Tomb, located on grounds of ʻIolani Palace. It isn't certain if his remains are still buried in the plot at Pohukaina or if they ever transported along with those of other members of the Young family and other royals to the newly constructed Royal Mausoleum at Mauna ʻAla in 1865.

== Marriage and children ==
Kānehoa married three times. His first marriage was to Sarah Kaniaulono Davis, the daughter of Isaac Davis, his father's comrade in arms. The wedding ceremony was performed by an English chaplain, and Mrs. Laura Judd states that it may have been the first Christian marriage in the Hawaiian Islands. He and Sarah had no children of their own but they hānai (adopted) one from Kānehoa's sister Jane Lahilahi and her husband Joshua Kaeo. This boy was named Keliimaikai Kaeo and called Alebada. One other marriage was to Haale and they had a daughter named Jane Lahilahi Young (1812–1862). Jane married a chief name Nuʻuanu and had a son named Samuel Nuʻuanu.

Kānehoa's last marriage was to Hikoni Kahele. Kānehoa willed most of his landholdings to Alebada but he died on October 13, 1851, shortly after his adoptive father. During the last six years of his life, he got to know his young niece Emma Rooke. He made his wishes clear to his wife, Hikoni, that his home in Lawai, a large ahupuaʻa that he owned in the district of Koloa, Kauaʻi where he served as a judge for a time, should one day be given to her. The rest of his lands were inherited by his widow and after her death willed to Emma.

== Family tree ==
John Young (Hawaii) family tree

Keliʻimaikaʻi (died 1809)	Kalikoʻokalani	Kalaipaihala
Kaʻōanāʻeha (died 1850)
Henry C. Lewis	Fanny Kekelaokalani (1806–1880)	George Naʻea (1797–1852)
Mary Paʻaʻāina (1833–1853)	James Augustus Griswold (1823–?)	Dr. T. C. B. Rooke (1806–1858)
House of Kamehameha
Queen Emma (1836–1885)	Kamehameha IV (1836–1885)	Kamehameha III (1813–1854)
Albert Kamehameha (1858–1862)	Kiwalaʻo (died 1851)

Robert Young	Grace
Davis Family
John Young (1742–1835)	Namokuelua (died 1804)
Robert (1796–1813?)	Haʻale	James Kānehoa (1797–1851)	Sarah Kaniaulono (1797–1867)
Jane Lahilahi	Nuʻuanu
Grace Kamaʻikuʻi (1808–1866)	Governor Cox Keʻeaumoku (1784–1824)
Samuel Nuʻuanu
Jane Lahilahi (1813–1862)	Joshua Kaʻeo (c. 1808–1858)	Keoni Ana (1810–1857)	Julia Alapaʻi (died 1849)
Albert Kūnuiākea (1851–1903)	Mary Lonokahikini (1851–1904)	Peter Kekuaokalani (1836–1880)	Keliʻimaikaʻi "Alebada" (died 1851)

Notes:
- Apple, Russel A. (1978). "Appendix A: Young Family Geneology". Pahukanilua: Homestead of John Young: Kawaihae, Kohala, Island of Hawaiʻi : Historical Data Section of the Historic Structure Report. Honolulu: National Park Office, Hawaii State Office. pp. 39–41. OCLC 4962701.
- "John Young's Family". The Daily Bulletin. Vol. XV, no. 51. Honolulu. March 2, 1891. p. 2.
- Kanahele, George S. (1999). Emma: Hawaii's Remarkable Queen. Honolulu: University of Hawaii Press. p. 5. ISBN 978-0-8248-2240-8. OCLC 40890919.
- McKinzie, Edith Kawelohea (1983). Stagner, Ishmael W. (ed.). Hawaiian Genealogies: Extracted from Hawaiian Language Newspapers. Vol. 1. Honolulu: University of Hawaii Press. pp. 38–39. ISBN 0-939154-28-5. OCLC 12555087.

Preceded by Kalākua Kaheiheimālie	Royal Governor of Maui; 1842 – October 1, 1851	Succeeded by Paul Nahaolelua
