= Jane Lahilahi =

Hawaiian High chiefess (1813–1862)

Jane Lahilahi Young
- Born: May 1813; Kawaihae
- Died: January 12, 1862 (aged 48 ) Kuaehelani, Honolulu
- Burial: Mauna ʻAla Royal Mausoleum
- Spouse: Joshua Kaʻeo; Kamehameha III (mistress)
- Issue: Peter Kaʻeo; Keliʻimaikai "Alebada" Kaʻeo; Kīwalaʻō; Albert Kūnuiākea
- Father: John Young Olohana
- Mother: Kaʻōanāʻeha

Jane Lahilahi Young Kaʻeo (May 1813 – January 12, 1862) was a Hawaiian high chiefess and a daughter of John Young Olohana, the royal advisor of Kamehameha I.

== Early life ==
She was born in May 1813, in Kawaihae, in the Kohala District, on the Island of Hawaiʻi. Her aging father was John Young the royal advisor of Kamehameha I, from Lancashire, England, who had been given high status and a vast tract of land. Her mother was High Chiefess Kaʻoanaʻeha, the niece of Kamehameha I. She was given the name of Jane and sometimes called Jenny Gini or "Kini", the Hawaiian version of Jane. She was raised on her father's homestead on a barren hillside overlooking Kawaihae Bay. It is now part of Puʻukoholā Heiau National Historic Site. She grew up with her two sisters, Fanny and Grace, and her brother, John (known as "Keoni Ana"). Fanny was eldest, Grace was second, John was third, and she was the youngest. She had two elder half-brothers by her father's first marriage to Namokuelua; they were Robert and James Kanehoa. She and her siblings were hapa-haole or part Caucasian, but still considered having royal status through their mothers. She was Princess Nāhiʻenaʻena's childhood companion.

== Family ==
A poet, she was skilled in the old allusive figurative style of her mother's ancestors. She married Hawaiian Joshua Kaʻeo, a Judge of the Supreme Court, and great-grandson of King Kalaniʻōpuʻu. Their son Peter Kaeo was born on March 4, 1836, attended the Royal School and was adopted by her brother John. Son Keliimaikai "Alebada" Kaeo was adopted by her brother James but died young in 1851, a week after his stepfather.

She later became a royal mistress of King Kamehameha III and bore him twin sons, Kīwalaʻō and Albert Kūnuiākea. Kīwalaʻō died as an infant but Albert lived to adulthood (1851–1903). Her son Albert was raised as a hānai (adopted) of Kamehameha III's queen, Kalama and lived on to be among the last in direct line of House of Kamehameha.

== Death and Burial ==
After having suffered over eight years from a stroke of paralysis, she died on January 12, 1862, at her residence at Kuaehelani, Beretania Street, Honolulu.

Since she was the maternal aunt of Queen Emma and daughter of John Young and Kaoanaeha, she was considered royal, so she was interred in the royal cemetery of Pohukaina located on grounds of ʻIolani Palace. She was later buried in the Wyllie Crypt of the Royal Mausoleum of Hawaii known as Mauna ʻAla along with many of the Young Family.

== Family Tree ==
John Young (Hawaii) family tree

Keliʻimaikaʻi (died 1809)	Kalikoʻokalani	Kalaipaihala
Kaʻōanāʻeha (died 1850)
Henry C. Lewis	Fanny Kekelaokalani (1806–1880)	George Naʻea (1797–1852)
Mary Paʻaʻāina (1833–1853)	James Augustus Griswold (1823–?)	Dr. T. C. B. Rooke (1806–1858)
House of Kamehameha
Queen Emma (1836–1885)	Kamehameha IV (1836–1885)	Kamehameha III (1813–1854)
Albert Kamehameha (1858–1862)	Kiwalaʻo (died 1851)

Robert Young	Grace
Davis Family
John Young (1742–1835)	Namokuelua (died 1804)
Robert (1796–1813?)	Haʻale	James Kānehoa (1797–1851)	Sarah Kaniaulono (1797–1867)
Jane Lahilahi	Nuʻuanu
Grace Kamaʻikuʻi (1808–1866)	Governor Cox Keʻeaumoku (1784–1824)
Samuel Nuʻuanu
Jane Lahilahi (1813–1862)	Joshua Kaʻeo (c. 1808–1858)	Keoni Ana (1810–1857)	Julia Alapaʻi (died 1849)
Albert Kūnuiākea (1851–1903)	Mary Lonokahikini (1851–1904)	Peter Kekuaokalani (1836–1880)	Keliʻimaikaʻi "Alebada" (died 1851)

Notes:
- Apple, Russel A. (1978). "Appendix A: Young Family Geneology". Pahukanilua: Homestead of John Young: Kawaihae, Kohala, Island of Hawaiʻi : Historical Data Section of the Historic Structure Report. Honolulu: National Park Office, Hawaii State Office. pp. 39–41. OCLC 4962701.
- "John Young's Family". The Daily Bulletin. Vol. XV, no. 51. Honolulu. March 2, 1891. p. 2.
- Kanahele, George S. (1999). Emma: Hawaii's Remarkable Queen. Honolulu: University of Hawaii Press. p. 5. ISBN 978-0-8248-2240-8. OCLC 40890919.
- McKinzie, Edith Kawelohea (1983). Stagner, Ishmael W. (ed.). Hawaiian Genealogies: Extracted from Hawaiian Language Newspapers. Vol. 1. Honolulu: University of Hawaii Press. pp. 38–39. ISBN 0-939154-28-5. OCLC 12555087.
