= Robert Young (Hawaii chief) =

Hawaiian chief (1796–1813)

- Born: February 14, 1796; Kawaihae, Hawaii
- Died: 1813 (aged 16–17); Bermuda
- House: House of Olohana; Royal House of Oahu
- Father: John Young ʻOlohana
- Mother: Namokuelua

Robert Young (1796 – c.1813) was a Hawaiian chief and the son of John Young, the British advisor of Kamehameha the Great.

== Early life ==
He was born February 14, 1796, the eldest son of John Young and his wife Namokuelua. Robert's mother, the chiefess Namokuelua, was of Oahuan aristocracy, although not of high rank. Even though he was his father's first son, Young was advanced in age, being over 48 while Robert's mother was 16 when he was born. Robert was the elder full brother of James Kanehoa Young, and he was elder half-brother of Fanny Kekelaokalani Young, Grace Kamaikui Young, John Kalaipaihala Young, and Jane Lahilahi Young, children of his father's second marriage to Kaoanaeha. He was one year older than James, 8 years older than Fanny, 10 years older than Grace, 14 years older than John and 17 years older than Jane.

== Education ==
In 1802, Robert and probably James were both sent abroad to Boston, Massachusetts for a Western education. A letter in the Archives, dated in 1804, referring to Robert having been left at school in America, would indicate the event to have been an early politic step. It is dated at Canton, February 10, 1804, directed to John Young, and is as follows:

I have sent you by Mr. Davis 20 pieces of Blue Nankeens and two boxes of tea. I left your son Robert well in America about six months since; he is at school and behaves very well. I shall do everything for him that I promised you, you may depend on it. I am very fond of him, and shall take great care to make him a good man. Remember me to Stewart, Davis, and Holmes when you see them, and believe me,

Your friend, JAMES MAGEE.

According to this letter, Robert could have only arrived in Boston, in October 1803. He may have started out from Hawaii in 1802, but the journey even by the standard of those days would not have taken more than 11 or 10 months.

== Death ==
Robert joined the American Navy at age 16 and served in the War of 1812. He was captured by the British and taken prisoner in the Battle of Lake Champlain. He was sent to the island of Bermuda, where he became lost to history. Nothing definite was ever heard from him again. One source states: It is said that he died early in his school career and was buried in the States, but no particulars can be gathered.

== See also ==
- List of kidnappings
- List of people who disappeared mysteriously (pre-1910)

== Family tree ==
John Young (Hawaii) family tree

Keliʻimaikaʻi (died 1809)	Kalikoʻokalani	Kalaipaihala
Kaʻōanāʻeha (died 1850)
Henry C. Lewis	Fanny Kekelaokalani (1806–1880)	George Naʻea (1797–1852)
Mary Paʻaʻāina (1833–1853)	James Augustus Griswold (1823–?)	Dr. T. C. B. Rooke (1806–1858)
House of Kamehameha
Queen Emma (1836–1885)	Kamehameha IV (1836–1885)	Kamehameha III (1813–1854)
Albert Kamehameha (1858–1862)	Kiwalaʻo (died 1851)

Robert Young	Grace
Davis Family
John Young (1742–1835)	Namokuelua (died 1804)
Robert (1796–1813?)	Haʻale	James Kānehoa (1797–1851)	Sarah Kaniaulono (1797–1867)
Jane Lahilahi	Nuʻuanu
Grace Kamaʻikuʻi (1808–1866)	Governor Cox Keʻeaumoku (1784–1824)
Samuel Nuʻuanu
Jane Lahilahi (1813–1862)	Joshua Kaʻeo (c. 1808–1858)	Keoni Ana (1810–1857)	Julia Alapaʻi (died 1849)
Albert Kūnuiākea (1851–1903)	Mary Lonokahikini (1851–1904)	Peter Kekuaokalani (1836–1880)	Keliʻimaikaʻi "Alebada" (died 1851)

Notes:
- Apple, Russel A. (1978). "Appendix A: Young Family Geneology". Pahukanilua: Homestead of John Young: Kawaihae, Kohala, Island of Hawaiʻi : Historical Data Section of the Historic Structure Report. Honolulu: National Park Office, Hawaii State Office. pp. 39–41. OCLC 4962701.
- "John Young's Family". The Daily Bulletin. Vol. XV, no. 51. Honolulu. March 2, 1891. p. 2.
- Kanahele, George S. (1999). Emma: Hawaii's Remarkable Queen. Honolulu: University of Hawaii Press. p. 5. ISBN 978-0-8248-2240-8. OCLC 40890919.
- McKinzie, Edith Kawelohea (1983). Stagner, Ishmael W. (ed.). Hawaiian Genealogies: Extracted from Hawaiian Language Newspapers. Vol. 1. Honolulu: University of Hawaii Press. pp. 38–39. ISBN 0-939154-28-5. OCLC 12555087.
