= Fanny Kekelaokalani =

Hawaiian high chiefess and royal

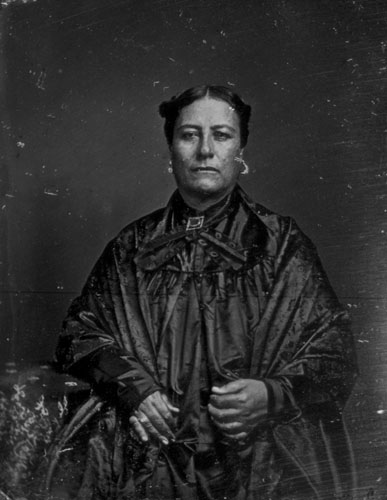
- Born: July 21, 1806; Kawaihae
- Died: September 4, 1880 (aged 74); Hānaiakamalama, Honolulu
- Burial: October 3, 1880; Mauna ʻAla Royal Mausoleum
- Spouse: Henry Coleman Lewis; George Naʻea
- Issue: Mary Polly Paaāina; Queen Emma; Kahalaiʻa; Kekuaokalani
Names
- Fanny Kekuʻiapoiwa Kailikulani Leleoili Kulua Kekelaokalani Young Lewis Naʻea
- Father: John Young Olohana
- Mother: Kaʻōanāʻeha

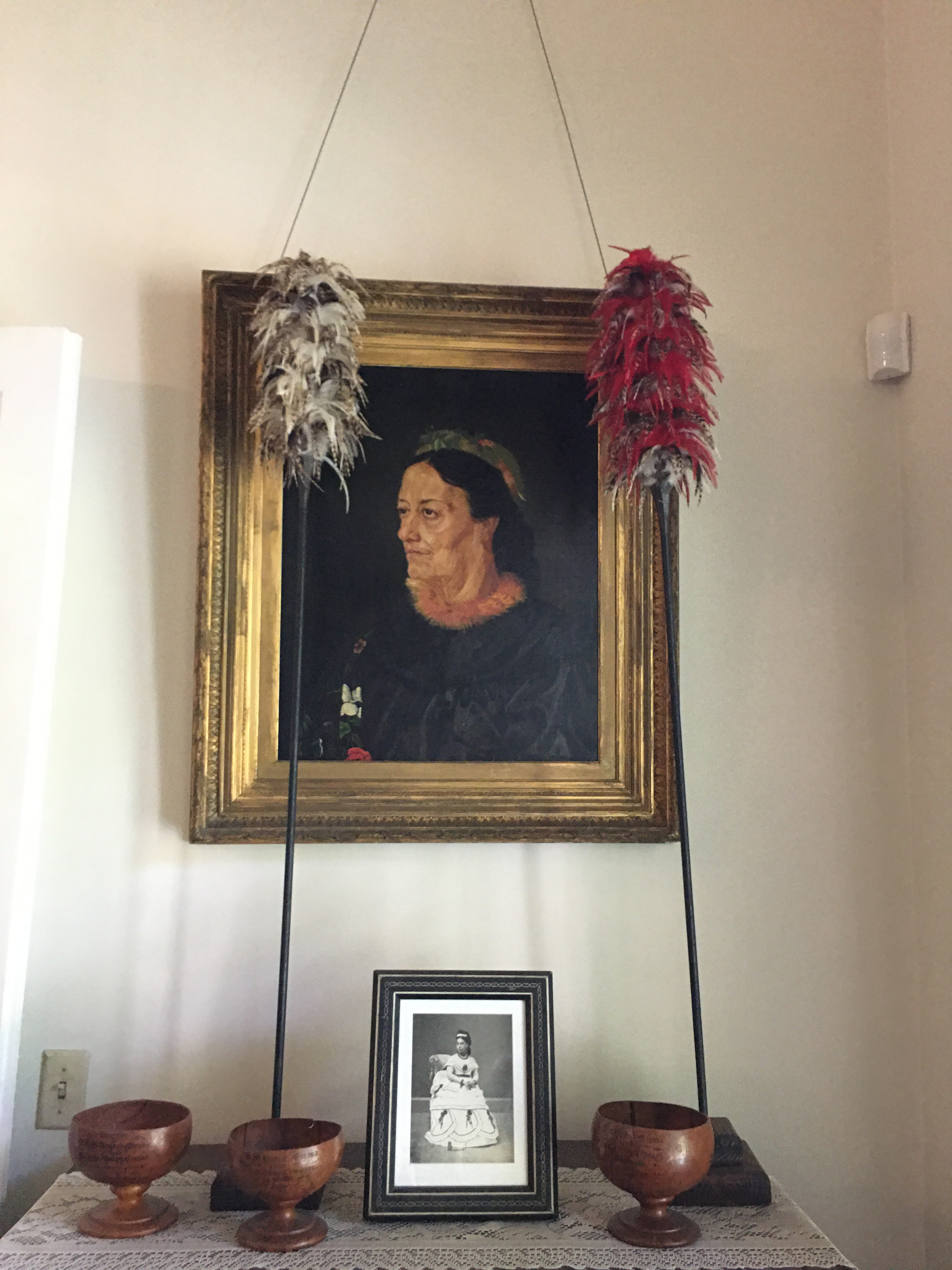
1880 portrait of Fanny Kekelaokalani Young hangs in the Queen Emma Summer Palace

Fanny Kekuʻiapoiwa Kailikulani Leleoili Kulua Kekelaokalani Young Naʻea (July 21, 1806 – September 4, 1880), was a Hawaiian high chiefess and a member of the royal family of the Hawaiian Kingdom, and mother of Queen Emma of Hawaii.

== Early life ==
She was born, July 21, 1806 in Kawaihae, in the Kohala District, on the Island of Hawaiʻi. Her father was John Young, a former English sailor who became the royal advisor of Kamehameha I. Her mother was the High Chiefess Kaʻoanaʻeha, the niece of Kamehameha I. She was given the name of Fanny or Fannie and sometimes referred to as Pane the Hawaiian version of Fanny. Her Hawaiian name Kekelaokalani derived from her great-great grandmother, the High Chiefess Kekelaokalani, the sister of Keeaumoku-nui, the grandfather of Kamehameha the Great. Her name Kekuiapoiwa derived from Kamehameha's mother and her great-grandmother. She was raised on her father's homestead on a barren hillside overlooking Kawaihae Bay. It is now part of Puʻukoholā Heiau National Historic Site. She grew up with two younger sisters, Grace and Jane, and younger brother, John. She had two older half-brothers by her father's first marriage to Namokuelua: Robert and James. The siblings were hapa-haole or part Caucasian, but considered of aliʻi (royal) class through their mother, and John Young's honorary title of "Olohana".

== Marriage ==
She married High Chief George Naʻea. With Naʻea she had a daughter Emma on January 2, 1836. She allowed her daughter to be adopted by her sister Grace Kamaikui and her husband Dr. Rooke according to the Hawaiian tradition known as hānai. Emma's birthplace has been debated as Kawaihae, Lahaina or Honolulu. Most likely Emma was born in Honolulu. Her father John Young died at her sister's home in Honolulu on December 16, only three weeks before Emma's birth. He had been living there for some time under Dr. Rooke's care, and it appears the Young family, including Fanny and Naʻea, gathered in Honolulu, perhaps in anticipation of his death. They were present at his funeral. It is unlikely the Rookes would have allowed Fanny in her last stages of pregnancy to risk the health of the baby by sailing the rough channels to Kawaihae or Lahaina. According to the Hawaiian newspaper The Daily Bulletin, she and Naʻea may have also had two other children: Kahalaiʻa and Kekuaokalani, who both died young. She maintained a close relationship to her daughter Emma, who would go on to marry King Kamehameha IV and have Prince Albert Kamehameha.

She had another older daughter Mary Polly Paʻaʻāina (1833–1853) with Henry Coleman Lewis, a foreigner. It is not certain if she and Lewis were married. Lewis died in the first week of the influenza epidemic of 1845.

== Later life ==
She was a resident of Lahaina for most of her life but she often stay with her sister and daughter in Honolulu. She was present at the deathbed of King Kamehameha V in 1872. All the other women eligible to become monarch were there: his half-sister Princess Ruth Keʻelikōlani, Bernice Pauahi Bishop, Queen Emma, and Lydia Kamakaeha Dominis. Fanny died September 4, 1880, in Honolulu at the residence of her daughter. She was 74 years old. She had lived past all her siblings and close relatives. She was the second last surviving member of the Young family; the last was her daughter Emma who lived until April 25, 1885. Her funeral on October 3 was marked by the absence of any members of the reigning Kalākaua dynasty, except for Archibald Scott Cleghorn Fanny was buried in the Wylie Tomb in the Royal Mausoleum of Hawaii known as Mauna ʻAla.

== Family tree ==
John Young (Hawaii) family tree

Keliʻimaikaʻi (died 1809)	Kalikoʻokalani	Kalaipaihala
Kaʻōanāʻeha (died 1850)
Henry C. Lewis	Fanny Kekelaokalani (1806–1880)	George Naʻea (1797–1852)
Mary Paʻaʻāina (1833–1853)	James Augustus Griswold (1823–?)	Dr. T. C. B. Rooke (1806–1858)
House of Kamehameha
Queen Emma (1836–1885)	Kamehameha IV (1836–1885)	Kamehameha III (1813–1854)
Albert Kamehameha (1858–1862)	Kiwalaʻo (died 1851)

Robert Young	Grace
Davis Family
John Young (1742–1835)	Namokuelua (died 1804)
Robert (1796–1813?)	Haʻale	James Kānehoa (1797–1851)	Sarah Kaniaulono (1797–1867)
Jane Lahilahi	Nuʻuanu
Grace Kamaʻikuʻi (1808–1866)	Governor Cox Keʻeaumoku (1784–1824)
Samuel Nuʻuanu
Jane Lahilahi (1813–1862)	Joshua Kaʻeo (c. 1808–1858)	Keoni Ana (1810–1857)	Julia Alapaʻi (died 1849)
Albert Kūnuiākea (1851–1903)	Mary Lonokahikini (1851–1904)	Peter Kekuaokalani (1836–1880)	Keliʻimaikaʻi "Alebada" (died 1851)

Notes:
- Apple, Russel A. (1978). "Appendix A: Young Family Geneology". Pahukanilua: Homestead of John Young: Kawaihae, Kohala, Island of Hawaiʻi : Historical Data Section of the Historic Structure Report. Honolulu: National Park Office, Hawaii State Office. pp. 39–41. OCLC 4962701.
- "John Young's Family". The Daily Bulletin. Vol. XV, no. 51. Honolulu. March 2, 1891. p. 2.
- Kanahele, George S. (1999). Emma: Hawaii's Remarkable Queen. Honolulu: University of Hawaii Press. p. 5. ISBN 978-0-8248-2240-8. OCLC 40890919.
- McKinzie, Edith Kawelohea (1983). Stagner, Ishmael W. (ed.). Hawaiian Genealogies: Extracted from Hawaiian Language Newspapers. Vol. 1. Honolulu: University of Hawaii Press. pp. 38–39. ISBN 0-939154-28-5. OCLC 12555087.

== Bibliography ==
- Brown, Marie Alohalani (December 2014). Facing the Spears of Change: the Life and Legacy of Ioane Kaneiakama Papa ʻĪʻī. Honolulu: University of Hawaii at Manoa. hdl:10125/101056.
- Cooke, Amos Starr; Cooke, Juliette Montague (1937). Richards, Mary Atherton (ed.). The Chiefs' Children School: A Record Compiled from the Diary and Letters of Amos Starr Cooke and Juliette Montague Cooke, by Their Granddaughter Mary Atherton Richards. Honolulu: Honolulu Star-Bulletin. OCLC 1972890.
- Kanahele, George S. (1999). Emma: Hawaii's Remarkable Queen. Honolulu: University of Hawaii Press. ISBN 978-0-8248-2240-8.
- Wyllie, Robert Crichton (1845). Simmonds, P. L. (ed.). Notes on the Sandwich, Or Hawaiian Islands. London: Simmonds and Ward. pp. 125–139. OCLC 405778069.
