= Thomas Charles Byde Rooke =

English physician and spouse of Hawaiian royal

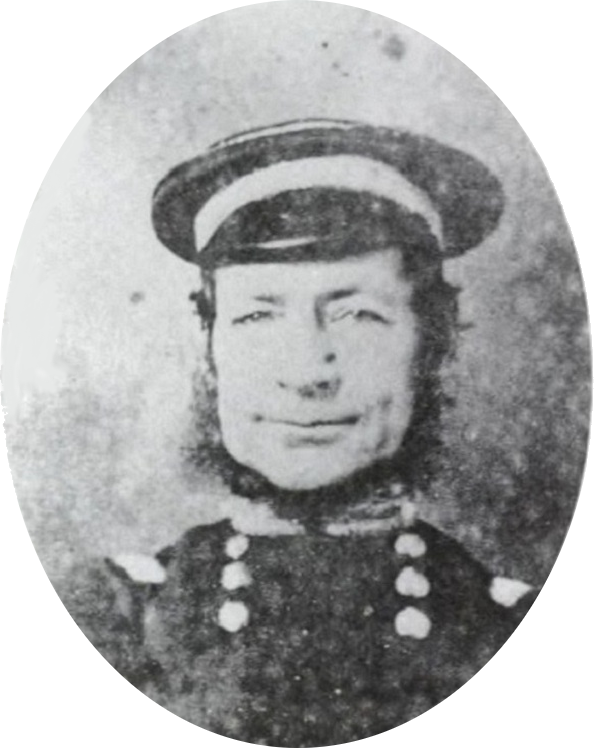
- Born: 18 May 1806; Hertfordshire, England
- Died: 28 November 1858 (aged 52); Kailua, Hawaii County, Hawaii
- Resting place: Mauna ʻAla Royal Mausoleum
- Occupation: Physician
- Spouse: Grace Kamaʻikuʻi Young
- Children: Emma (hānai)
- Parent(s): Thomas Rooke; Sarah Paillet Draper

Thomas Charles Byde Rooke (18 May 1806 – 28 November 1858) was an English medical doctor who married into the royal family of the Kingdom of Hawaii. He built a mansion called the Rooke House in Honolulu that became popular with political and social leaders of the Kingdom.

== Life ==
He was born on 18 May 1806 in Bengeo, Hertfordshire, England. His father was Thomas Rooke (1769–1814) and mother was Sarah Paillet Draper (died 1815).

He trained at St Bartholomew's Hospital in London and arrived in Honolulu about 1829 on an English whaling ship. In 1830 he married Grace Kamaʻikuʻi Young (1808–1866). In 1844 he met Abraham Fornander who worked for him surveying and supervising a coffee plantation.

== Rooke House ==
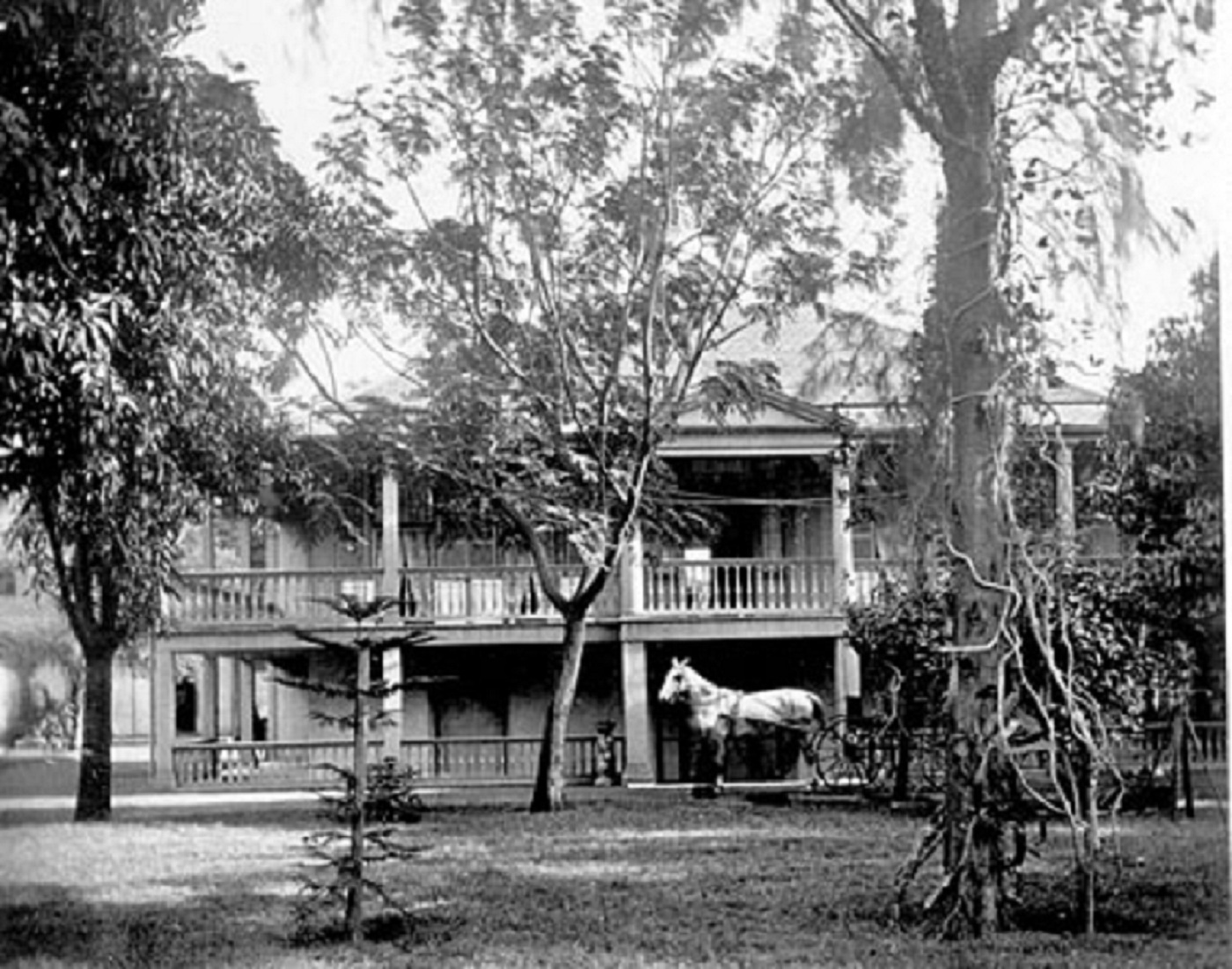
Rooke House

Rooke built a house some time in the 1830s. The house faced the Nuʻuanu Valley and with each of its two floors measuring approximately fifty by fifty feet (floor area of 5,000 square feet (460 m^{2}) or 460 square meters) was one of largest private homes in Honolulu at the time. It was used for medical practice, a large library, and for entertaining guests. It included a coach house and living quarters for kahu ("servants"). A wide veranda swept the front of the house, and four pillars supported the roof. The ground floor was Rooke's clinic and dispensary. The family lived upstairs, in a style redolent of a British manor house, with red Kashmir carpets, mahogany and dark oak furniture, and framed oil paintings. It was on the ma kai-Waikiki (southwest) corner of Beretania and Nuʻuanu Avenue and bordered by Fort Street and Chaplain Lane, 21°18′41″N 157°51′36″W. The one-and-a-half-acre parcel, called Kaopuana ("Raincloud"), was probably the gift of Kamehameha III.

On 16 December 1835, Grace's father John Young died, mostly likely in Rooke House, with the Young and Isaac Davis family present. Dr. Rooke had been caring for the nonagenarian British sailor during his illness. Three weeks after the Young's death, a girl Emma was born, the granddaughter of Young, daughter of Fanny Young and the hānai (adoptive) daughter of the Rookes. Much later, the house witnessed the death of two others of the Young family: James Kānehoa, Grace Rooke's half-brother, and Kaʻōanaʻeha, her mother.

Popularly known as "Rooke House", the residence was known throughout Honolulu for its hospitality. Grace Rooke, steeped in her mother's aliʻi tradition of hoʻokipa (hospitality), was a gracious hostess. Dr. Rooke, always elegantly attired, complemented his naturally shy wife with his open, gregarious, and forthright manner. Rooke House, for most of Emma's childhood, was a place of elaborate dinners, parties, teas and receptions. Visiting families included those of Abner Paki, John Owen Dominis, Captain John Paty and Skinner, and the King. This affirmed their high status in business and political circles.

Isabella Bird, who visited Queen Emma in 1873, described as Rooke House as "the most English-looking house I have seen since I left home, except Bishopscourt at Melbourne." During the Royal Election of 1874 between Emma and David Kalakaua over who would succeed William Charles Lunalilo, Rooke House served as a gathering place for the supporters of Queen Emma, called Emmaites or Queenites. The residence was the scene of mass gatherings of Hawaiians and some British with chants celebrating Emma's rightful claim to the throne.

During the 1900s it was a kindergarten named Queen Emma Hall in honor of the last owner of the house. Later the site of Rooke House was occupied by the Liberty Theater (which closed in 1980) and now it's a parking lot.

== Later life ==
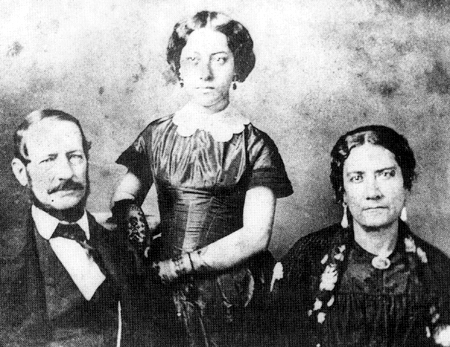
The Rookes in 1853

Rooke served as a representative to the legislature of the Hawaiian Kingdom from 1851–1855, and in 1858 was appointed to the Privy Council.

He was a founding member of the first Hawaii Medical Association, along with Charles Guillou, William Hillebrand and Gerrit P. Judd in 1856. In 1856 his adoptive daughter became Queen Consort Emma when she married King Kamehameha IV. He brought two influences from his native land: Anglicanism and Freemasonry. He attended his adopted son-in-law Kamehameha IV's Freemason initiation ceremony in January 1857.

Rooke died of apoplexy on 28 November 1858, at Kailua-Kona. He was buried in the cemetery on the Iolani Palace grounds and later his remains were transferred to the Royal Mausoleum of Hawaii. He was one of the only four Europeans allowed to be buried at the Royal Mausoleum of Hawaii.

If Rooke had lived a few months longer, he would have seen the establishment of The Queen's Medical Center, established through funds raised by Emma and Kamehameha IV. His medical instruments were donated to the hospital.

He owned some land in a part of Nuʻuanu valley called Waolani that came to be known as "Rooke's Valley". Queen Emma's uncle Keoni Ana, the premier, built a summer home in Nu`uanu called Hānaiakamālama and bequeathed it to Emma. Used as a summer retreat by Kamehameha IV and Queen Emma, it is now a museum. A street was named Rooke Avenue for Dr. Rooke in that area at 21°20′7″N 157°50′51″W. Another part of the land became the Oahu Country Club golf course. He also owned some land on Kauaʻi island.

== Family tree ==
John Young (Hawaii) family tree

Keliʻimaikaʻi (died 1809)	Kalikoʻokalani	Kalaipaihala
Kaʻōanāʻeha (died 1850)
Henry C. Lewis	Fanny Kekelaokalani (1806–1880)	George Naʻea (1797–1852)
Mary Paʻaʻāina (1833–1853)	James Augustus Griswold (1823–?)	Dr. T. C. B. Rooke (1806–1858)
House of Kamehameha
Queen Emma (1836–1885)	Kamehameha IV (1836–1885)	Kamehameha III (1813–1854)
Albert Kamehameha (1858–1862)	Kiwalaʻo (died 1851)

Robert Young	Grace
Davis Family
John Young (1742–1835)	Namokuelua (died 1804)
Robert (1796–1813?)	Haʻale	James Kānehoa (1797–1851)	Sarah Kaniaulono (1797–1867)
Jane Lahilahi	Nuʻuanu
Grace Kamaʻikuʻi (1808–1866)	Governor Cox Keʻeaumoku (1784–1824)
Samuel Nuʻuanu
Jane Lahilahi (1813–1862)	Joshua Kaʻeo (c. 1808–1858)	Keoni Ana (1810–1857)	Julia Alapaʻi (died 1849)
Albert Kūnuiākea (1851–1903)	Mary Lonokahikini (1851–1904)	Peter Kekuaokalani (1836–1880)	Keliʻimaikaʻi "Alebada" (died 1851)

Notes:
- Apple, Russel A. (1978). "Appendix A: Young Family Geneology". Pahukanilua: Homestead of John Young: Kawaihae, Kohala, Island of Hawaiʻi : Historical Data Section of the Historic Structure Report. Honolulu: National Park Office, Hawaii State Office. pp. 39–41. OCLC 4962701.
- "John Young's Family". The Daily Bulletin. Vol. XV, no. 51. Honolulu. 2 March 1891. p. 2.
- Kanahele, George S. (1999). Emma: Hawaii's Remarkable Queen. Honolulu: University of Hawaii Press. p. 5. ISBN 978-0-8248-2240-8. OCLC 40890919.
- McKinzie, Edith Kawelohea (1983). Stagner, Ishmael W. (ed.). Hawaiian Genealogies: Extracted from Hawaiian Language Newspapers. Vol. 1. Honolulu: University of Hawaii Press. pp. 38–39. ISBN 0-939154-28-5. OCLC 12555087.
