= Grace Kamaʻikuʻi =

Hawaiian high chiefess (1808–1866)

Grace Kamaʻikuʻi Young Rooke
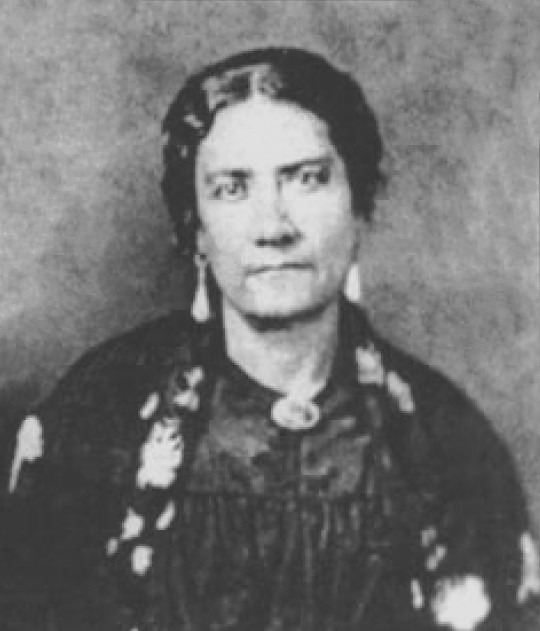
- Born: September 8, 1808; Kawaihae, Hawaii
- Died: July 26, 1866 (aged 57); Honolulu, Oahu
- Burial: August 18, 1866; Mauna ʻAla Royal Mausoleum
- Spouse: Kahekili Keʻeaumoku; Thomas Charles Byde Rooke
- Issue: Queen Emma (hānai)
- Father: John Young Olohana
- Mother: Kaʻōanāʻeha

Grace Kamaʻikuʻi Young Rooke (September 8, 1808 – July 26, 1866) was a Hawaiian high chiefess who was daughter of John Young, the chief military advisor during the formation of the Kingdom of Hawaii, and adoptive mother and aunt of a future queen consort.

== Early life and marriage ==
She was born in 1808, in Kawaihae, in the Kohala District, on the Island of Hawaiʻi. Her father was John Young, known as Olohana, the royal advisor of Kamehameha I, from Lancashire, England. Her mother was High Chiefess Kaʻoanaʻeha, the niece of Kamehameha I. She was probably named after John Young's mother from England. She was raised on her father's homestead on a barren hillside overlooking the Kawaihae Bay, on land Kamehameha had given to her father on the Island of Hawaiʻi. It is now part of Puʻukoholā Heiau National Historic Site. She grew up with her two sisters, Fanny and Jane, and her brother, John. Fanny was oldest, Grace was second, John was third, and Jane the youngest. She had two older half-brothers by her father's first marriage to Namokuelua: Robert and James. The siblings were hapa-haole or part Caucasian, but still considered to have royal status from their mother.

In her teenage years, she married High Chief "George Cox" Kahekili Keʻeaumoku, the Governor of Maui. Cox was a close advisor of the Hawaiian king and the younger brother of the powerful Queen regent Kaʻahumanu's. He was about twenty years her senior, so she was left a young widow when Cox died at Honolulu, Oahu in 1823. She remarried Thomas Charles Byde Rooke (1806–1858), a British physician to king Kamehameha III, in 1830. She was the only royal part-Hawaiian chiefess to marry a white man in her generation. Her sisters, Fanny and Jane, had married native Hawaiian nobles.

== Marriage to Rooke ==
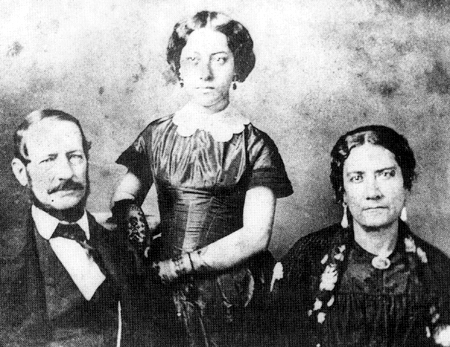
Grace and her husband and hānai daughter.

Grace had a fair command of the English language and was acquainted with British ways. She probably felt socially equal, if not superior, to her husband for he had come from a family of commoners. Yet he was "a man of rare cultivation and refinement", with an outgoing and cheery disposition that complemented Grace's natural bashfulness. Rooke operated a dispensary in a one-story, part-adobe structure on Union Street in Honolulu. As one of the only three Western doctors in the Kingdom, he had more business than he could handle. The Rookes' connections with the royal court made them secure and comfortable.

Both Rookes wanted a child but Grace was unable to give birth. She and Dr. Rooke decided upon hānai adoption. Hānai was a common custom in native Hawaiian culture, even if both natural parents of the adopted child were still living, despite missionaries' stern opposition to "giving away" children. All classes, especially the royal family, practiced hānai. Adoption generally occurred in the same ʻohana, or extended family. The Rookes, therefore, could choose between the children of Grace's sisters, Jane and Fanny. Why, in the end, they chose Fanny is unknown; it may have been because Fanny was a more serious stable person and a Christian, while Jane tended to be "clever as well as a little frivolous." Fanny and her husband George Naeʻa consented, promising the child before its birth.

As soon as the baby was delivered, the Rookes "immediately" wrapped her in soft tapa cloth and took her to their home nearby, a two-storey, frame building on Union Street facing Fort Street in Honolulu. One should not take the word, "immediately", too literally, for it was customary to preserve the piko or umbilical cord, to bathe the infant and perhaps oil it lightly, to wrap it snugly in its tapa-cloth receiving blanket, to allow the mother to nurse it, and then to perform the hānai ceremony. When a child was handed to the adoptive parents, the natural parents would seal the act with words "Nau ke keiki kukae a naʻau", meaning literally, "I give you this child intestines and all". (In Hawaiian tradition, the intestines were regarded as the seat of emotion, intelligence, and character.) The ceremony of hānai constituted a solemn promise that was as binding as any modern legal instrument: the Rookes did not sign a written deed of adoption until December 30, 1851, fifteen years after.

Their hānai daughter was named Emma, who took the surname of her hānai parents, Rooke. Grace and her husband moved into their new spacious wood-frame mansion, Rooke House, shortly after Emma's birth. While Dr. Rooke raised Emma with British customs, Grace raised her in Hawaiian ways. Emma learned about the world from her scholarly father, with the help of letters of advice from her paternal grandmother in England. The British did not spoil their children, while Hawaiians did, especially upper class children, so they compromised. Emma called Grace Kiawai. She grew up speaking both the Hawaiian language and English language fluently. Emma began her formal education at the Chiefs' Children's School at five years of age. After living in the Hawaiian Islands for nearly thirty years, the fifty-two-year-old Dr. Rooke died on November 28, 1858, at Kailua, Hawaii. Grace died July 26, 1866. Her funeral was held on August 18 and she was buried in the Royal Mausoleum of Hawaii at Mauna ʻAla. Emma was traveling in the eastern United States and Canada at the time and upon receiving the news of her death by telegram on a stop at Montreal, she immediately returned to Hawaii returning home by October 22. Emma later wrote to Kamehameha V, "I loved my mother above everything on this side of the grave and perhaps it was my erring in making too much of my earthly thing that she has been taken from me..."

== Family tree ==
John Young (Hawaii) family tree

Keliʻimaikaʻi (died 1809)	Kalikoʻokalani	Kalaipaihala
Kaʻōanāʻeha (died 1850)
Henry C. Lewis	Fanny Kekelaokalani (1806–1880)	George Naʻea (1797–1852)
Mary Paʻaʻāina (1833–1853)	James Augustus Griswold (1823–?)	Dr. T. C. B. Rooke (1806–1858)
House of Kamehameha
Queen Emma (1836–1885)	Kamehameha IV (1836–1885)	Kamehameha III (1813–1854)
Albert Kamehameha (1858–1862)	Kiwalaʻo (died 1851)

Robert Young	Grace
Davis Family
John Young (1742–1835)	Namokuelua (died 1804)
Robert (1796–1813?)	Haʻale	James Kānehoa (1797–1851)	Sarah Kaniaulono (1797–1867)
Jane Lahilahi	Nuʻuanu
Grace Kamaʻikuʻi (1808–1866)	Governor Cox Keʻeaumoku (1784–1824)
Samuel Nuʻuanu
Jane Lahilahi (1813–1862)	Joshua Kaʻeo (c. 1808–1858)	Keoni Ana (1810–1857)	Julia Alapaʻi (died 1849)
Albert Kūnuiākea (1851–1903)	Mary Lonokahikini (1851–1904)	Peter Kekuaokalani (1836–1880)	Keliʻimaikaʻi "Alebada" (died 1851)

Notes:
- Apple, Russel A. (1978). "Appendix A: Young Family Geneology". Pahukanilua: Homestead of John Young: Kawaihae, Kohala, Island of Hawaiʻi : Historical Data Section of the Historic Structure Report. Honolulu: National Park Office, Hawaii State Office. pp. 39–41. OCLC 4962701.
- "John Young's Family". The Daily Bulletin. Vol. XV, no. 51. Honolulu. March 2, 1891. p. 2.
- Kanahele, George S. (1999). Emma: Hawaii's Remarkable Queen. Honolulu: University of Hawaii Press. p. 5. ISBN 978-0-8248-2240-8. OCLC 40890919.
- McKinzie, Edith Kawelohea (1983). Stagner, Ishmael W. (ed.). Hawaiian Genealogies: Extracted from Hawaiian Language Newspapers. Vol. 1. Honolulu: University of Hawaii Press. pp. 38–39. ISBN 0-939154-28-5. OCLC 12555087.
