= Kaʻōanaʻeha =

Hawaiian high chiefess

Kaʻōanaʻeha Mele, or Mary Kuamoʻo Kaʻōanaʻeha (c. 1780 – January 22, 1850), was a Hawaiian high chiefess during the formation of the Kingdom of Hawaii.

== Parentage ==
She was born circa 1780 as the daughter of High Chiefess Kalikoʻokalani. Genealogists disagree over who was Kaʻōanaʻeha's father due to her mother's two marriages. Most say she was the daughter of High Chief Keliʻimaikaʻi (The Good Chief) who was the only full-blood brother of Kamehameha I, being the son of Keōua and Kekuʻiapoiwa II. Some say her father was High Chief Kalaipaihala, son of Kalaniʻōpuʻu, King of Hawaii and uncle of Kamehameha. King Kalākaua and Queen Liliʻuokalani support the latter due to their conflict with Kaoanaeha's granddaughter Emma Naʻea, who ran for Queen Regnant in the Royal Election of 1874. Keliʻimaikaʻi accepted her as a daughter and most say he was her true father. She was the only person allowed to see him on his deathbed.

Fifty years after her death, a claim was brought by Robert William Wilcox that she was the daughter of Keaka, a low-ranking Tahitian chief, who came to the islands and married Kalikoʻokalani. This claim was brought up in an editorial to defame one of Kaʻōanaʻeha's descendants.

== Royal status ==
Because of her royal status, when she was born, pūloʻuloʻu or kapu sticks with tapa-covered balls on the ends were set up before her house, and pahu heiau or kapu drums were beaten, heralding her birth. Also, when her father, Keliʻimaikaʻi, died in 1810, she was reportedly the only person allowed to enter his premises.

One romanticized version of her meeting with English sailor John Young is similar to the story of Pocahontas and John Smith:

Young and Davis would have been killed had not Kaoanaeha, a high lady, fallen in love with Young and by her intercession with the King saved the lives of both sailors. Kaoanaeha was the most beautiful woman on the island of Owhyhee (Hawaii) and was the admiration of all the sailors who visited Karakakooa Bay. She was the only daughter of Keliimaiki, the favorite brother of the great King, Kamehameha I. John Young and Kaoanaeha were soon married. King Kamehameha appreciated the superior talents of the white men and made them high chiefs.

== Death ==
In the last days of her life, she wished to stay in Kawaihae. She had been reluctant to go to Honolulu because she probably thought that she would not return, just as fifteen years before, her husband did not return. At sixty-two, she died in Rooke House on January 22, 1850. She was buried the next day on the palace grounds by the Royal Tomb without any high ceremony. The official Polynesian devoted a few lines to her obituary. It was indicated that she was "out of favor in the royal circle of Honolulu", partly because she preferred the traditional Hawaiian values, including the ancient religion, and had resisted Christianity and Westernization.

== Family tree ==
John Young (Hawaii) family tree

Keliʻimaikaʻi (died 1809)	Kalikoʻokalani	Kalaipaihala
Kaʻōanāʻeha (died 1850)
Henry C. Lewis	Fanny Kekelaokalani (1806–1880)	George Naʻea (1797–1852)
Mary Paʻaʻāina (1833–1853)	James Augustus Griswold (1823–?)	Dr. T. C. B. Rooke (1806–1858)
House of Kamehameha
Queen Emma (1836–1885)	Kamehameha IV (1836–1885)	Kamehameha III (1813–1854)
Albert Kamehameha (1858–1862)	Kiwalaʻo (died 1851)

Robert Young	Grace
Davis Family
John Young (1742–1835)	Namokuelua (died 1804)
Robert (1796–1813?)	Haʻale	James Kānehoa (1797–1851)	Sarah Kaniaulono (1797–1867)
Jane Lahilahi	Nuʻuanu
Grace Kamaʻikuʻi (1808–1866)	Governor Cox Keʻeaumoku (1784–1824)
Samuel Nuʻuanu
Jane Lahilahi (1813–1862)	Joshua Kaʻeo (c. 1808–1858)	Keoni Ana (1810–1857)	Julia Alapaʻi (died 1849)
Albert Kūnuiākea (1851–1903)	Mary Lonokahikini (1851–1904)	Peter Kekuaokalani (1836–1880)	Keliʻimaikaʻi "Alebada" (died 1851)

Notes:
- Apple, Russel A. (1978). "Appendix A: Young Family Geneology". Pahukanilua: Homestead of John Young: Kawaihae, Kohala, Island of Hawaiʻi : Historical Data Section of the Historic Structure Report. Honolulu: National Park Office, Hawaii State Office. pp. 39–41. OCLC 4962701.
- "John Young's Family". The Daily Bulletin. Vol. XV, no. 51. Honolulu. March 2, 1891. p. 2.
- Kanahele, George S. (1999). Emma: Hawaii's Remarkable Queen. Honolulu: University of Hawaii Press. p. 5. ISBN 978-0-8248-2240-8. OCLC 40890919.
- McKinzie, Edith Kawelohea (1983). Stagner, Ishmael W. (ed.). Hawaiian Genealogies: Extracted from Hawaiian Language Newspapers. Vol. 1. Honolulu: University of Hawaii Press. pp. 38–39. ISBN 0-939154-28-5. OCLC 12555087.
