= Keeaumoku =

Keeaumoku may refer to:

- Keeaumoku Nui or Kalani Kama Keʻeaumoku-nui (18th-century), grandfather of King Kamehameha I
- Keeaumoku Papaiahiahi or Keʻeaumoku Pāpaʻiahiahi (1736–1804), father of Queen Kaʻahumanu
- Keeaumoku II or George Cox Kahekili Keʻeaumoku II (1784 - 1824), brother of Queen Kaʻahumanu
