= George Naʻea =

Chief of the Kingdom of Hawaii

George Naʻea (died 1854), was a high chief of the Kingdom of Hawaii, and father of Queen Emma of Hawaii. He became one of the first Native Hawaiians to contract leprosy and the disease became known as maʻi aliʻi (the "sickness of the chiefs") in the Hawaiian language because of this association.

== Life ==
Born in the late 18th century, George Naʻea was the son of High Chief Kamaunu and High Chiefess Kukaeleiki. His father Kamaunu was descended from the high chiefs of the northern districts of the island of Hawaii. His mother Kukaeleiki was the daughter of Kalauawa, a Kauaʻi high chief, and she was also a cousin of Queen Keōpūolani, the most sacred wife of Kamehameha I. Among Naʻea's more notable ancestors were Kalanawaʻa, a high chief of Oʻahu, and Kuaenaokalani, a Maui high chiefess who held the sacred kapu rank of Kekapupoʻohoʻolewaikala (the kapu of Poʻohoʻolewaikala, a rank so sacred that she could not be exposed to the sun except at dawn). His brother was Bennett Nāmākēhā, a member of the House of Nobles, and Nāmākēhā's granddaughter Stella Keomailani (1866–1927) was the last of the Poʻohoʻolewaikala line.

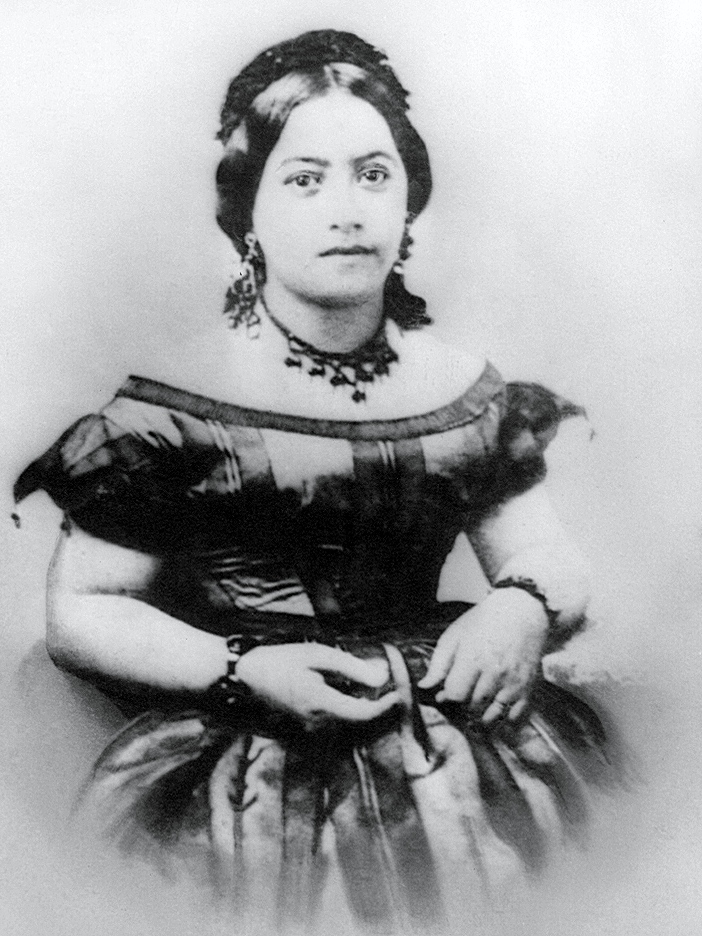
George Naʻea's daughter Queen Emma of Hawaii

Naʻea served under Kamehameha III as a member of his Council of Chiefs. He married Fanny Kekelaokalani Young, the hapa-haole (half-white) daughter of Kaʻōanaʻeha, and John Young, the British advisor of King Kamehameha I. The couple lived on the island of Maui, in Lahaina, which was the capital of the Kingdom of Hawaii at the time.

They had three known children: Kahalaiʻa and Kekuaokalani, whom both died young, and Emma, the future Queen Emma of Hawaii. Emma was given at birth to be raised by Fanny's younger sister Grace Kamaʻikuʻi and her husband Dr. Thomas Charles Byde Rooke under the Hawaiian tradition of hānai (informal adoption). Naʻea played no role in his daughter's upbringing and was not allowed contact with her due to his eventual illness. Historian and biographer of Queen Emma, George Kanahele wrote that "Emma never knew her natural father", and his relative anonymity prompted many to believe that Dr. Rooke was her biological father.

=== Contracting leprosy ===
Around 1838, Naʻea contracted leprosy. Many claimed that this was the first case of leprosy in Hawaii, even though the condition had been diagnosed earlier in the 1820s and 1830s. Differing accounts exist as to how he contracted this disease. Writing in 1864, Reverend Dwight Baldwin alleged that Naʻea had contracted the illness from a low-level royal who had returned from China with the leprosy infection. In his unpublished memoirs written before his death in 1932, Ambrose K. Hutchison, a resident superintendent of the leper settlement of Kalaupapa, recounted oral traditions on the origin of leprosy in Hawaii. According to Hutchison, Naʻea had contracted the illness from his Chinese cook who had arrived in the islands during the early sandalwood trade. The illness was diagnosed by the royal physician Dr. William Hillebrand, who recommended isolation for the incurable disease to the King and his Council of Chiefs. Thus Naʻea was banished to Wailuku, Maui, and not allowed to return or visit Lahaina. Kanahele stated that he may have continued living under the care of his wife Fanny (who did not contract the disease), and continued to lead a productive life since Minister Robert Crichton Wyllie described him as a "highly respectable Hawaiian".

Naʻea died on October 4, 1854. Hutchison claimed that after his death, the kahu or household attendants who had accompanied Naʻea during his isolation "scattered all over the Islands" and "that these attendants contracted the disease of their liege Lord and were the carriers that planted the disease on all the islands of Hawaii". From this association, leprosy became known as maʻi aliʻi (the "sickness of the chiefs"). The illness was also known as maʻi pake (the "Chinese sickness") after its place of origin. More than a decade after Naʻea's death, the Hawaiian government under Kamehameha V adopted a systematic policy of segregation for the afflicted and established a leper settlement at Kalaupapa on the island of Molokaʻi, to which Peter Kaʻeo, a nephew of Fanny's and a cousin of Emma's, would be exiled in 1873.

== Bibliography ==
- Apple, Russel A. (1978). "Appendix A: Young Family Geneology". Pahukanilua: Homestead of John Young: Kawaihae, Kohala, Island of Hawaiʻi : Historical Data Section of the Historic Structure Report. Honolulu: National Park Office, Hawaii State Office. pp. 39–41. OCLC 4962701.
- Halford, Francis John (1954). Nine Doctors and God. Honolulu: University of Hawaii. OCLC 854244525.
- Hawaii. Board of Health (1886). Appendix E: Report of Dr. G. L. Fitch, 1884. Honolulu: Daily Bulletin Steam Printing Office. pp. xviii–xxxvi. OCLC 29102438.
- Inglis, Kerri A. (2013). Ma'i Lepera: A History of Leprosy in Nineteenth-Century Hawai'i. Honolulu, HI: University of Hawaii Press. ISBN 978-0-8248-6579-5 – via Project MUSE.
- Kaeo, Peter; Queen Emma (1976). Korn, Alfons L. (ed.). News from Molokai, Letters Between Peter Kaeo & Queen Emma, 1873–1876. Honolulu: The University Press of Hawaii. hdl:10125/39980. ISBN 978-0-8248-0399-5. OCLC 2225064.
- Kanahele, George S. (1999). Emma: Hawaii's Remarkable Queen. Honolulu: University of Hawaii Press. ISBN 978-0-8248-2240-8. OCLC 40890919.
- Law, Anwei Skinsnes (2012). Kalaupapa: A Collective Memory (Ka Hokuwelowelo). Honolulu: University of Hawaii Press. ISBN 978-0-8248-6580-1. OCLC 830023588 – via Project MUSE.
- London, Charmian (1918). Jack London and Hawaii. London: Mills & Boon. OCLC 11750539.
- McKinzie, Edith Kawelohea (1983). Stagner, Ishmael W. (ed.). Hawaiian Genealogies: Extracted from Hawaiian Language Newspapers. Vol. 1. Honolulu: University of Hawaii Press. ISBN 0-939154-28-5. OCLC 12555087.
- Mouritz, Arthur Albert St. M. (1916). "The Path of the Destroyer": A History of Leprosy in the Hawaiian Islands and Thirty Years Research Into the Means by which it Has Been Spread. Honolulu: Press: Honolulu Star-Bulletin, Ltd. OCLC 14801226.
- Tayman, John (2010). The Colony: The Harrowing True Story of the Exiles of Molokai. New York: Simon and Schuster. ISBN 978-1-4165-5192-8. OCLC 865230373.
