= Puʻukoholā Heiau National Historic Site =

Historic place in Hawaii County, Hawaii

- U.S. National Register of Historic Places
- U.S. National Historic Landmark
- U.S. National Historic Site
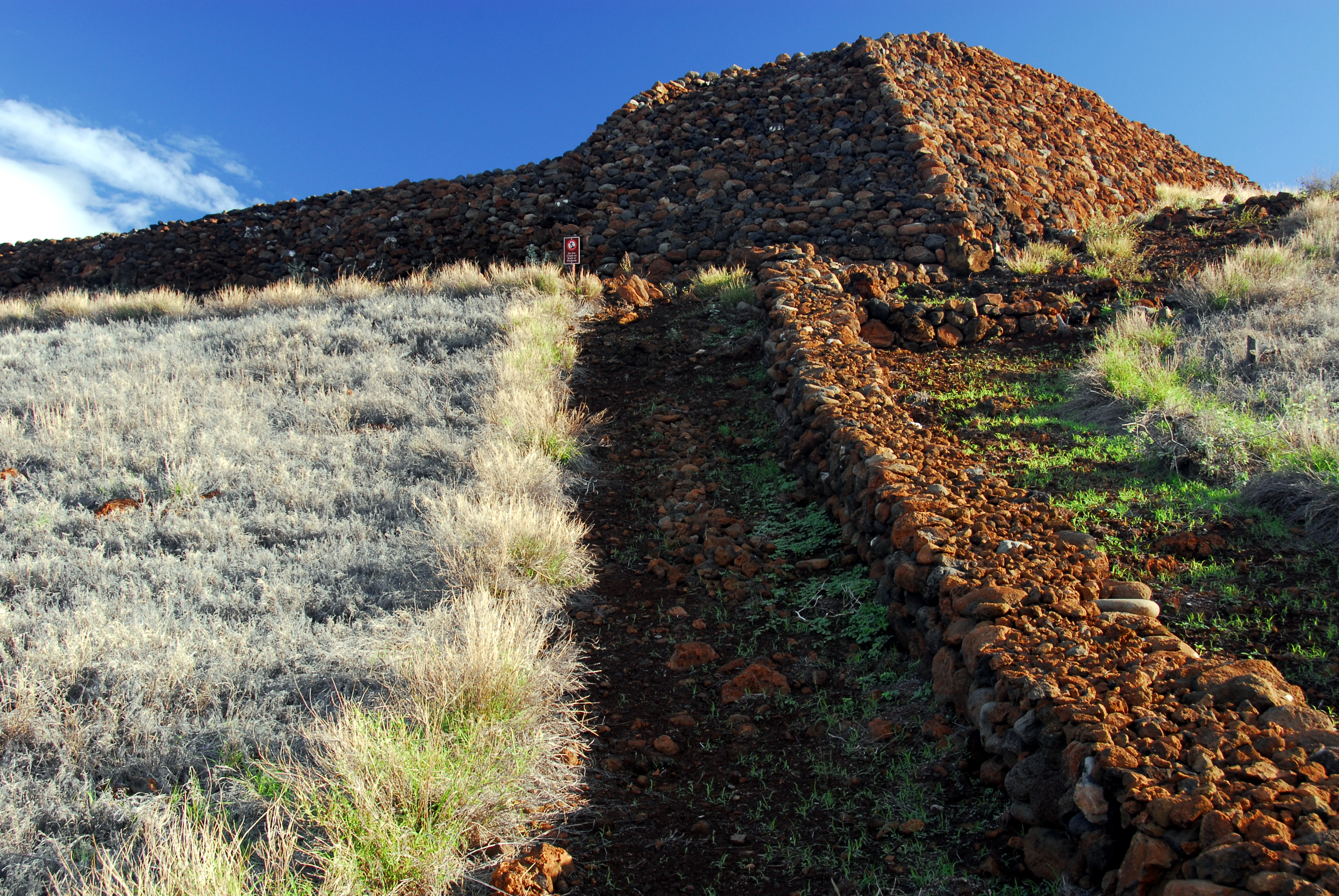

- Location within Hawaii
- Location: Hawaii County, Hawaii
- Nearest city: Waimea
- Coordinates: 20°01′36″N 155°49′12″W
- Area: 76.6 acres (31.0 ha)
- Architect: Kamehameha I
- Architectural style: Ancient Hawaiian
- Visitation: 21,978 (2025)
- Website: Puʻukoholā Heiau National Historic Site
- NRHP reference No.: 66000105

Significant dates
- Added to NRHP: October 15, 1966
- Designated NHL: December 29, 1962

Battle of Kawaihae
- Part of Unification of Hawaii
Date	1791
Location	Kawaihae, Hawaiʻi Island
Result	Kamehameha I unifies island

Belligerents
Kamehameha I's army	Keōua Kuahuʻula

Commanders and leaders
Kamehameha I	Keōua Kuahuʻula

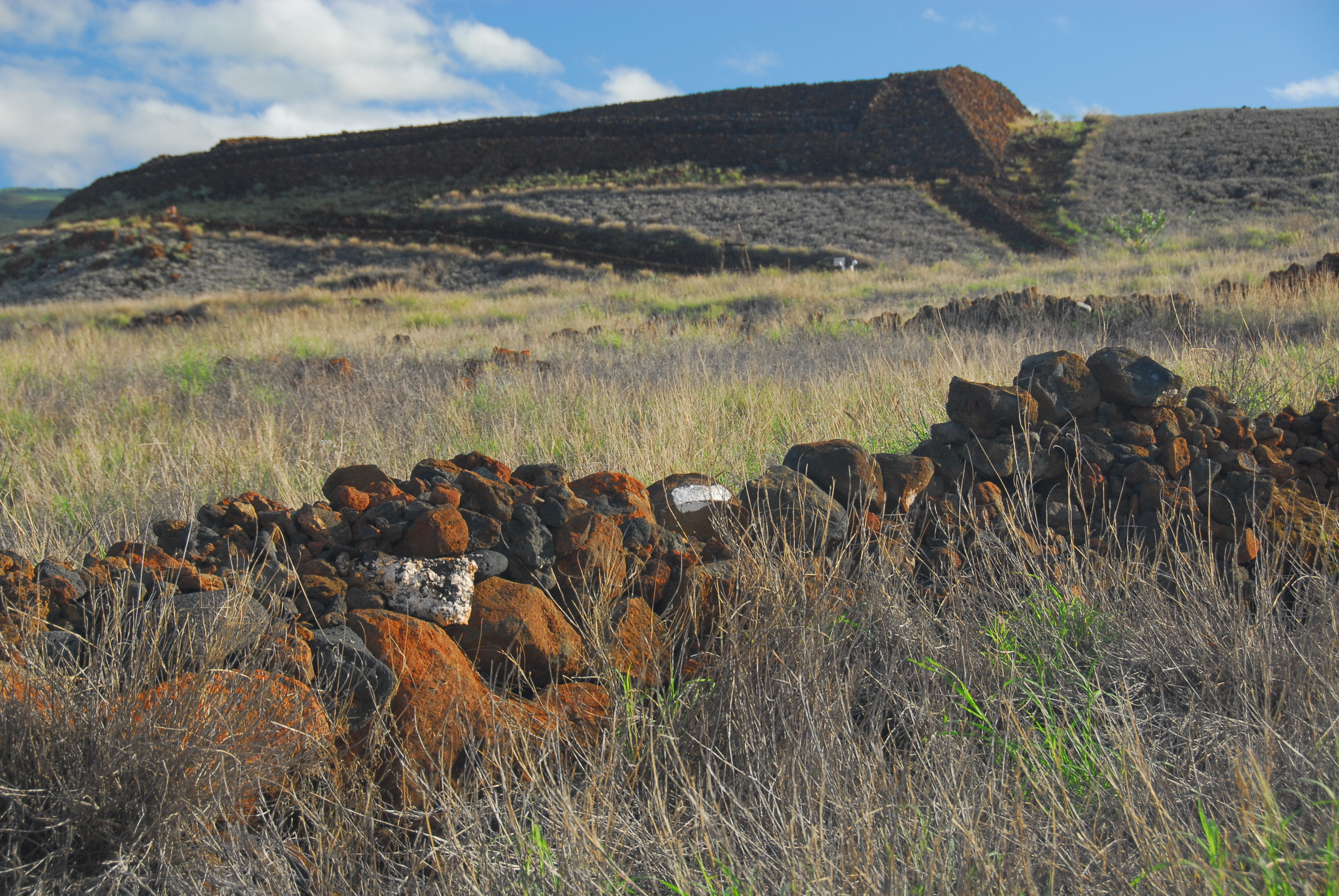
Ruins of Mailekini Heiau in foreground

Puʻukoholā Heiau National Historic Site is a United States National Historic Site located on the northwestern coast of the island of Hawaiʻi. The site preserves the National Historic Landmark ruins of the last major Ancient Hawaiian temple, and other historic sites.

== Building of the heiau ==
Kamehameha I took control of western and northern Hawaiʻi island (the Kona and Kohala districts) in 1782, but for the eight years following, fought in a number of inconclusive battles. After returning from Maui in 1790, he was attacked by his cousin Keōua Kuahuʻula who still controlled the East side of the island. He returned to the village of Kawaihae, where he had spent some time earlier. A respected kahuna (priest) named Kapoukahi suggested building a luakini heiau (sacrificial temple) to gain the favor of the war god Kūkaʻilimoku.

Puʻukoholā Heiau, meaning "Temple on the Hill of the Whale", was the result, probably on the site of an older temple from about 1580. It was built entirely by hand with no mortar, in less than a year. The red stones were transported by a human chain about 14 miles long, from Pololū Valley to the East. Construction was supervised by Kamehameha's brother Keliʻimaikaʻi, involving thousands of people.

The ship Fair American had been captured in 1790, along with one surviving crew member, Isaac Davis, after the incident at Olowalu. Davis and a stranded British sailor named John Young became important military advisors to King Kamehameha. Young built a house and ranch nearby, and that site is also within the park.

News of Kamehameha's large following had spread to the other islands, who joined forces and attempted to invade from the northeast. The two Europeans had instructed Kamehameha's army in the use of muskets and had mounted cannons onto double-hulled canoes. The invaders were no match for the artillery and were repelled in what was known as the Battle of Kepuwahaʻulaʻula (red mouthed gun), just north of Waipiʻo Valley.

== Last battle for unification ==
In the summer of 1791, the massive temple was finished, measuring about 224 by 100 feet. Kamehameha summoned his cousin Keōua Kuahuʻula with the ruse of a peace treaty. It is not clear why Keōua accepted the invitation. Perhaps he was surrendering to fate, discouraged by losing many of his warriors in the Battle of Hilo and subsequent volcanic eruption of 1790. One story told is that Keōua secretly mutilated himself in order to defile the sacrifice. As he stepped ashore, he and his party were captured and killed. With the offering of the bodies the new temple was officially dedicated. The campaign to unite all the islands continued with Maui in 1794, and Oʻahu in 1795 at the Battle of Nuʻuanu. The unification was completed when the king of the island of Kauaʻi became a vassal to Kamehameha I, in 1810 making the latter the first king of a unified Hawai'i.

The one-sided nature of this battle has given it the name "Slaughter at Kawaihae". On the 200th anniversary in 1991, a healing ceremony was held here by descendants of some of those who took part in the assassination.

== More visitors ==
John Young was to act as interpreter and negotiator for several more important visitors. The British explorer George Vancouver arrived here in 1793 during his Vancouver Expedition, and left cattle to start the ranching industry.

== Today ==
A visitor center operated by the National Park Service is located at the site. An interpretive trail begins at the visitor center and leads to Puʻukoholā. Entry to the public is not allowed, since there are believed to still be bones buried in the site. About 170 feet west of Puʻukoholā is the ruin of the earlier Mailekini Heiau. John Young later converted it into a fort to protect the harbor. Just offshore is Hale o Kapuni, an underwater structure dedicated to sharks. A pōhaku (stone post) marks a spot where the feeding of the sharks could be viewed. Across the bay is the modern Kawaihae harbor.

On December 29, 1962, the site was made a National Historic Landmark, and on October 15, 1966, listed in the National Register of Historic Places as site 66000105. In 2000 the name was changed by the Hawaiian National Park Language Correction Act of 2000 observing the Hawaiian spelling.

== Gallery ==
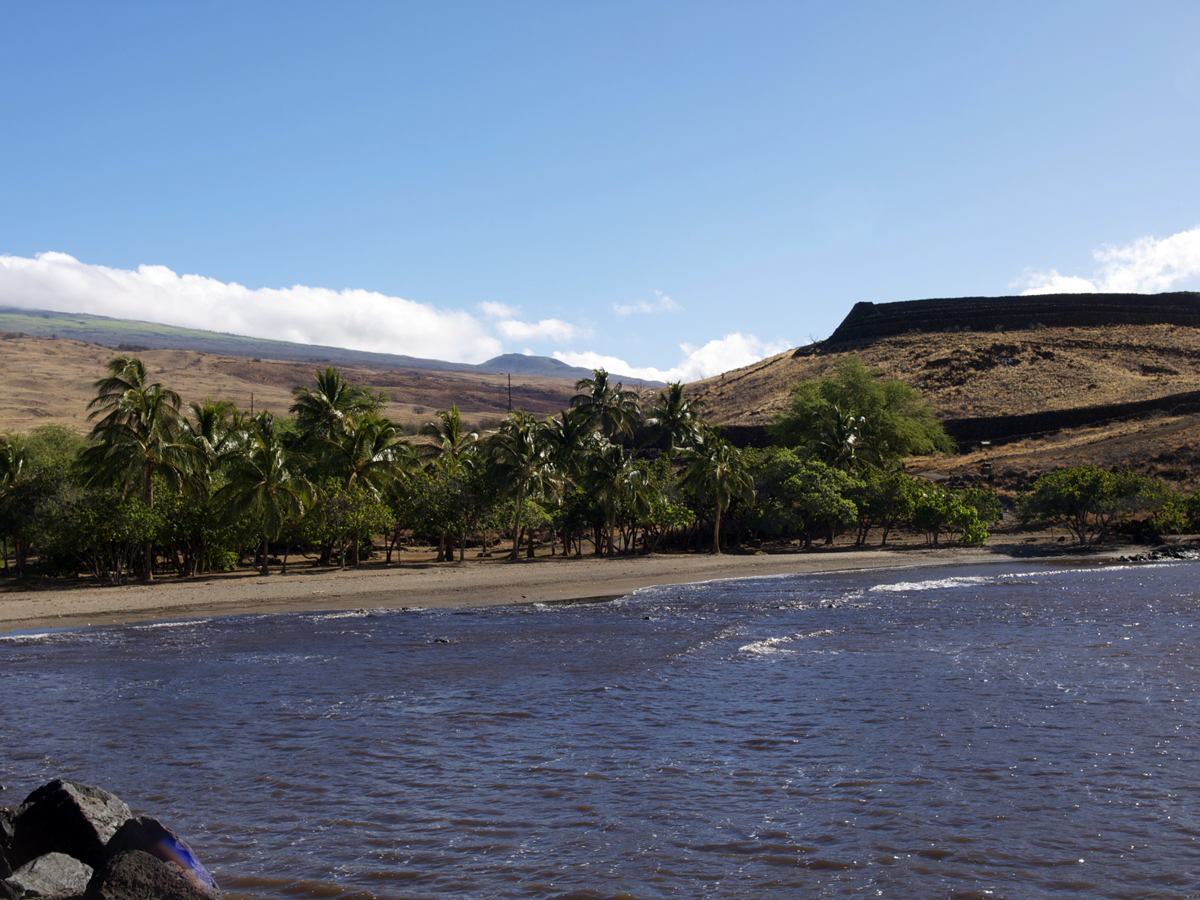
Puʻukohola Heiau view from the beach

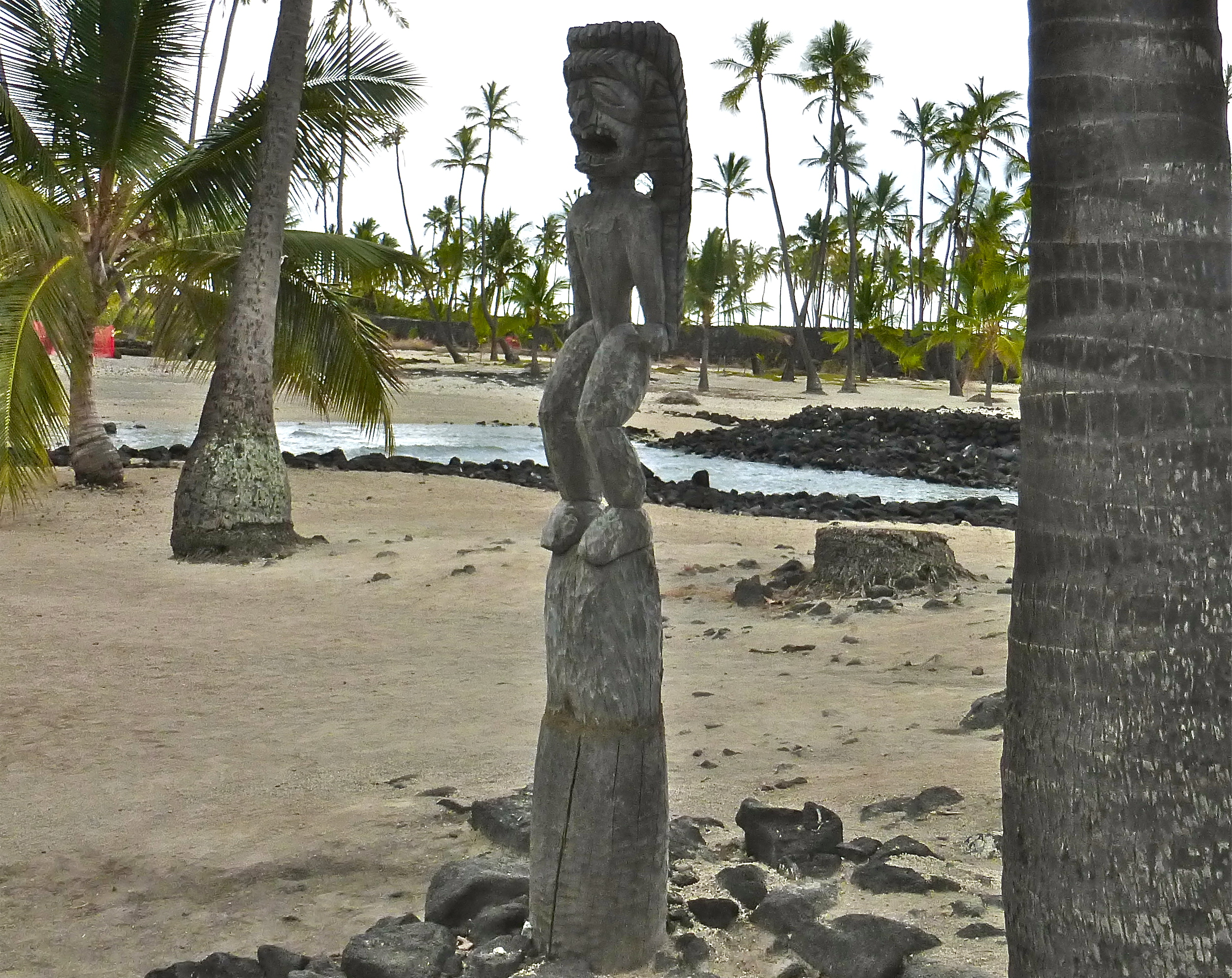
Puʻ ukohola Heiau

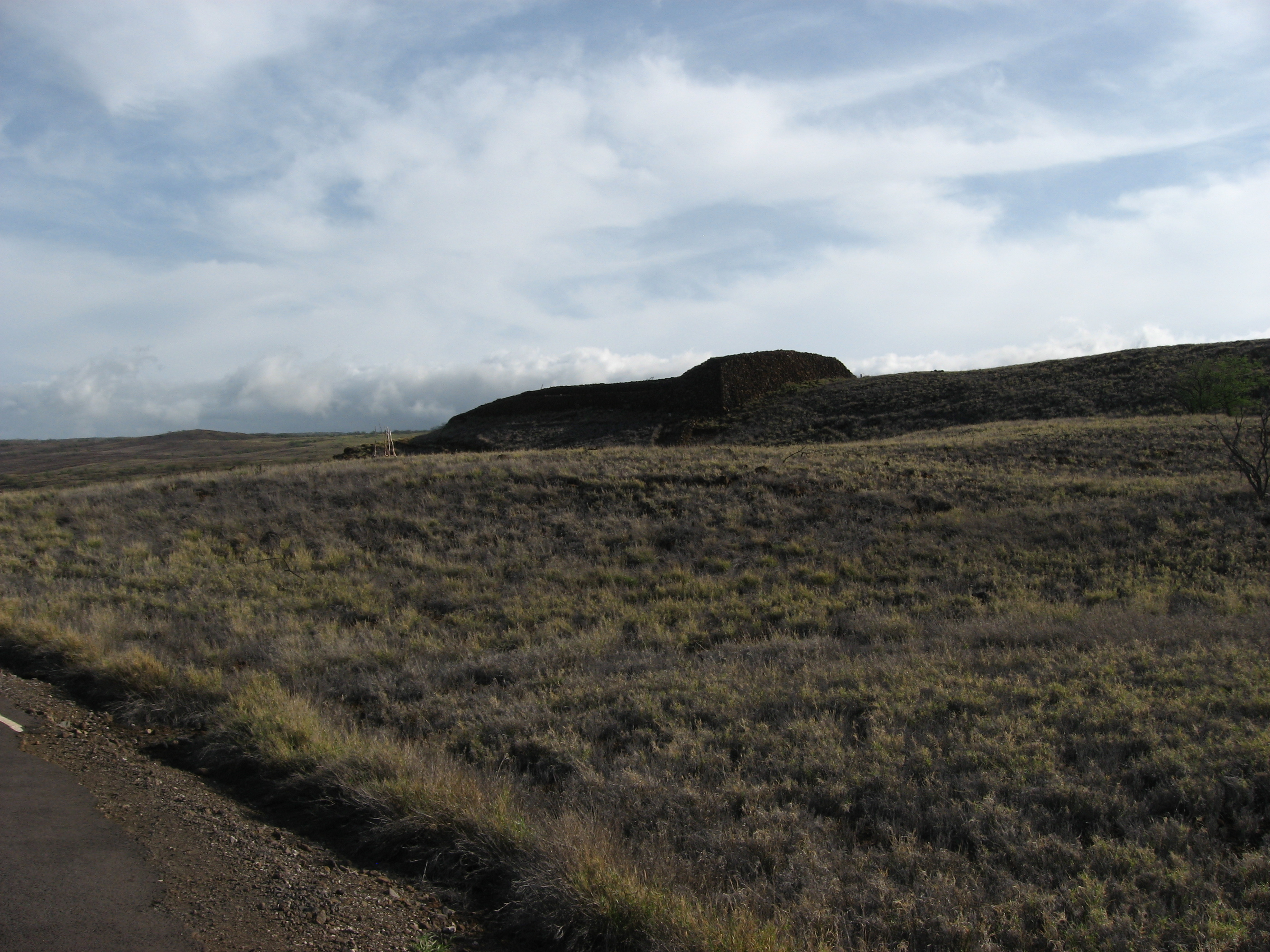
The Hill of the Whale

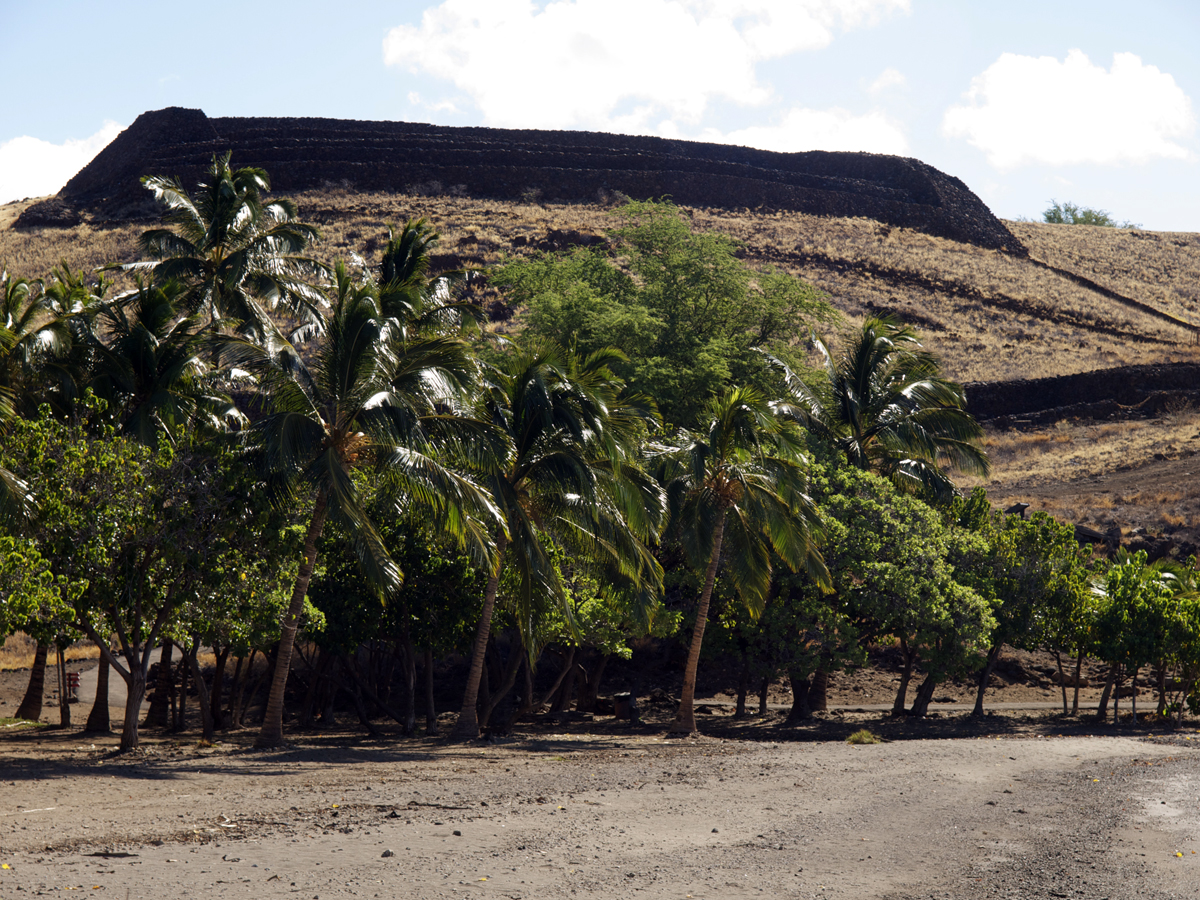
Palms at Puʻukohola Heiau

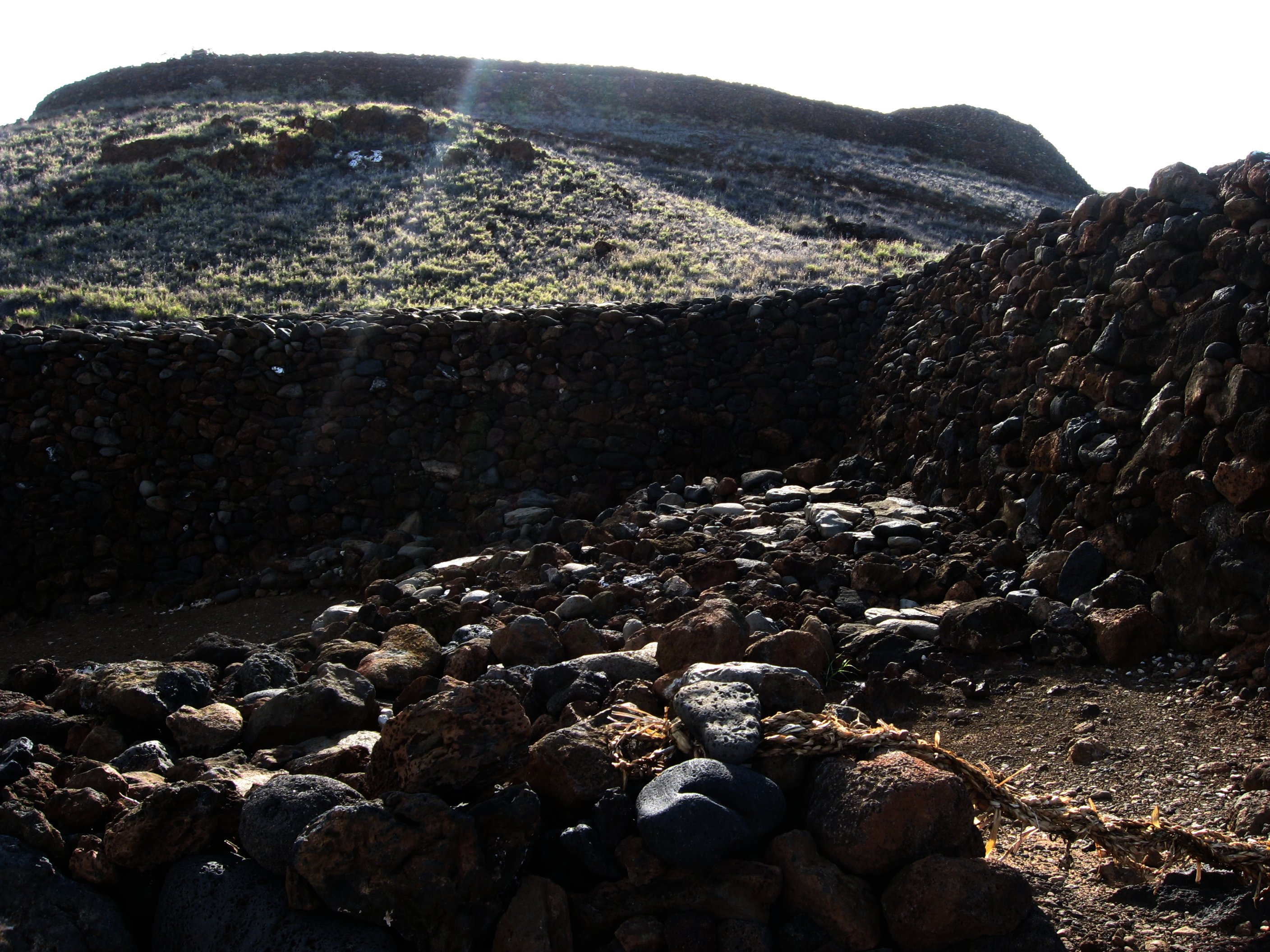
Mailekini Heiau
