= Mary Polly Paʻaʻāina =

Hawaiian chiefess and sister of Queen Emma

Mary Polly Paʻaʻāina, also known as Mary ʻĪʻī (c. 1833 – May 28, 1853) was a Hawaiian chiefess of the Kingdom of Hawaii. At a young age, she was chosen to attend the Chiefs' Children's School (later renamed Royal School) taught by the American missionary Amos Starr Cooke and his wife, Juliette Montague Cooke, alongside her half-sister Queen Emma of Hawaii and fourteen of her royal cousins.

== Early life and education ==
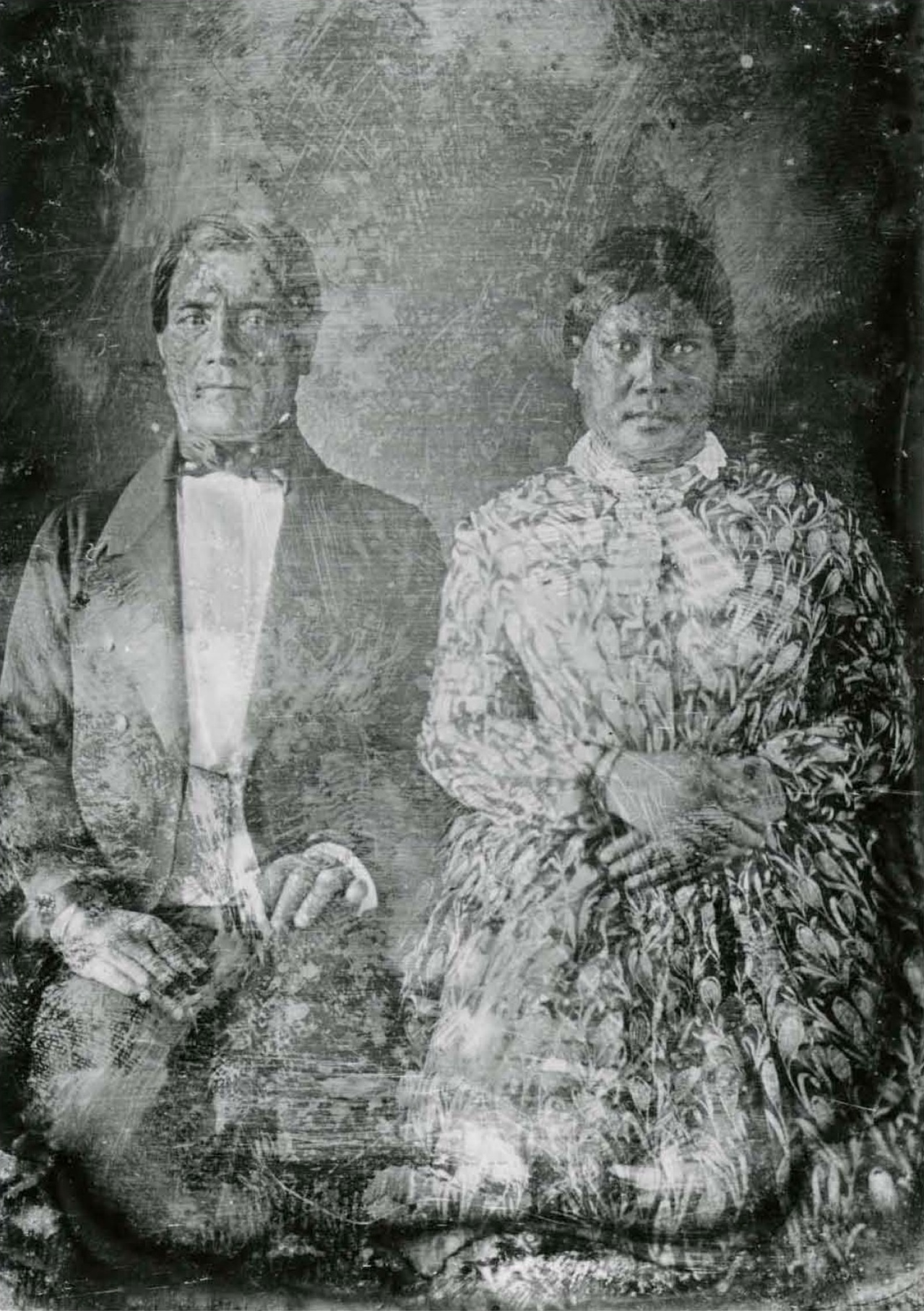
John Papa ʻĪʻī and Sarai Hiwauli, the hānai parents of Mary Polly Paʻaʻāina, ca. 1851

She was born circa 1833 to Henry Coleman Lewis and High Chiefess Fanny Kekelaokalani Young. Her mother was daughter of John Young, the British advisor of Kamehameha I. Her half-sister was Emma Rooke, who was three years younger than her and the daughter of her mother's marriage to George Naʻea. Her biological father Henry Coleman Lewis died in the first week of the influenza epidemic of 1845. She was adopted under the Hawaiian tradition of hānai by John Papa ʻĪʻī and his wife Sarai Hiwauli. Her hānai parents were lower-ranking aliʻi and her foster father also served as kahu (caretaker) to Princess Victoria Kamāmalu. Sources disagree on the spelling of her name. She was called "Polly Paaina" by the Cookes, while Liliʻuokalani called her "Mary Paaina" in Hawaii's Story by Hawaii's Queen. The number of "a" letters in her name often varies.

Entering in May 1843, Paʻaʻāina was the fifteenth pupil and last girl to enter the Chiefs' Children's School (the last boy John William Pitt Kīnaʻu entered in 1844). Along with her classmates, she was chosen by Kamehameha III to be eligible for the throne of the Kingdom of Hawaii. She was taught in English by American missionaries Amos Starr Cooke and his wife, Juliette Montague Cooke, alongside her royal cousins. She was taught reading, spelling, penmanship, arithmetic, geometry, algebra, physics, geography, history, bookkeeping, singing and English composition by the missionary couple. In the classroom students were divided by their age and/or length of time at the school. The older group consisted of Moses Kekūāiwa, Lot Kapuāiwa, Alexander Liholiho, William Charles Lunalilo, Jane Loeau, Bernice Pauahi, Abigail Maheha and Elizabeth Kekaʻaniau who had attended the school since 1839. The next class consisted of Emma Rooke, James Kaliokalani, Peter Kaʻeo and David Kalākaua. Due to her late attendance, Mary Paʻaʻāina was placed in the youngest class together with Victoria Kamāmalu, Lydia Kamakaʻeha (Liliʻuokalani), and John William Pitt Kīnaʻu. During their Sunday procession to church it was customary for boys and girls to walk side by side, Paʻaʻāina would walk beside her first cousin Peter Kaʻeo.

American merchant Gorham D. Gilman visited the Royal School in 1848 and gave a brief description of Paʻaʻāina:

The other and the last is the adopted daughter of John Ii who has been in the school the last few years—and who appears to be a pleasant and amiable young lady.

== Later life ==
The boarding school was discontinued in 1850. Little detail is known about her adult life. She continued to live with her hānai parents and Princess Victoria Kamāmalu at the school until the family moved to their new home Mililani, across from the old ʻIolani Palace. In 1851, Paʻaʻāina married American James Augustus Griswold (1825–1868) in Honolulu, Oʻahu. Griswold was naturalized as a citizen of the Hawaiian Kingdom on December 26 of the same year in order to marry a Hawaiian woman. The exact date of their marriage was either December 21 or December 30.

In 1853, Paʻaʻāina fell ill and after much suffering from a lingering illness, died at Princess Victoria Kamāmalu's residence on May 28, 1853 of scrofulous complaints. Her funeral was held the next day at Mililani, the residence of her hānai father John Papa ʻĪʻī. The missionary newspaper Friends described her last days:

Her sufferings during her last sickness were extreme. She felt conscious of danger, and, as far as human eye could see, prepared herself for her departure. She took a calm and effecting [sic] leave of her friends that were present, and sent her last message to absent ones. She expressed the wish that others whom she loved would prepare while in health for the trying hour of death. "Dearest Mary thou hast left us, Here thy loss we deeply feel, But ‘tis God who hath bereft us, He can all our sorrow heal."

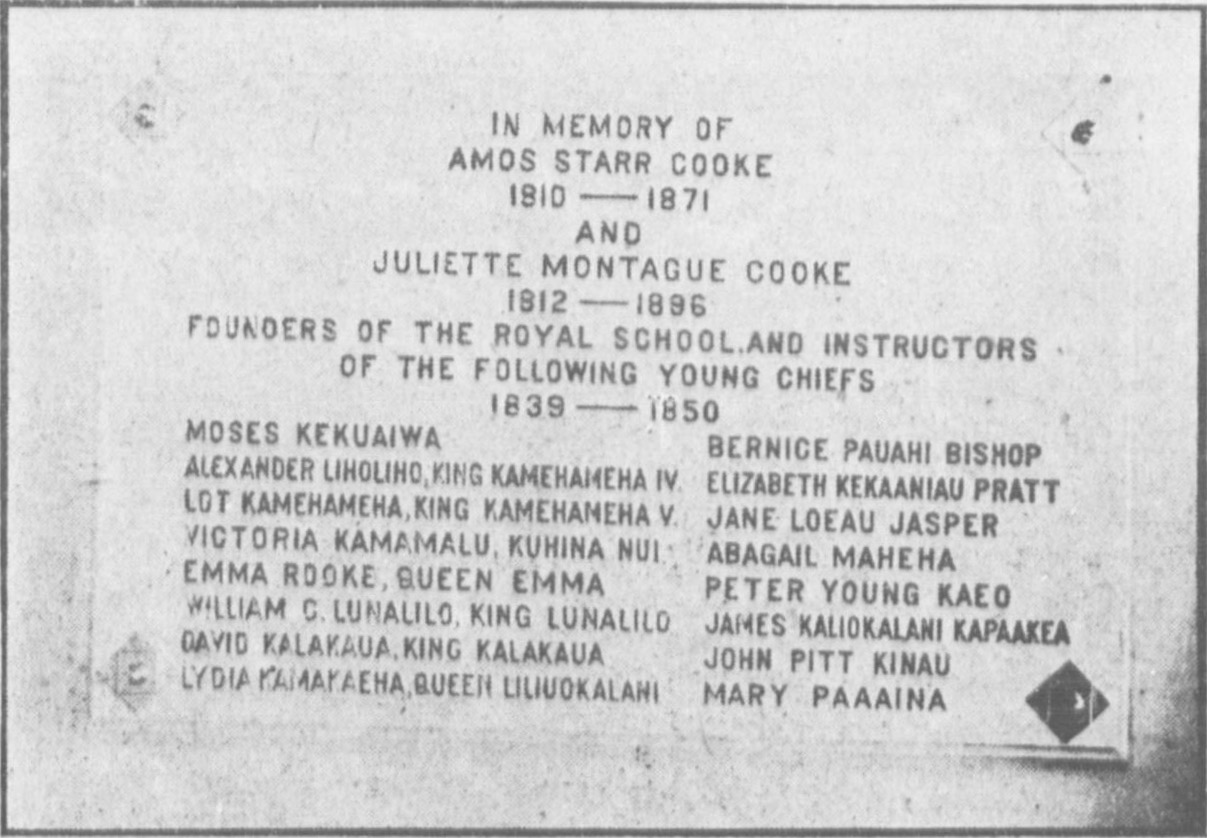
The Cooke Memorial Tablet at Kawaiahaʻo Church commemorating the sixteen royal children and their teachers

On March 17, 1912, the Cooke Memorial Tablet was dedicated at Kawaiahaʻo Church commemorating the sixteen royal children of the original Royal School, and their teachers, on the one hundredth anniversary of the birth of Juliette Montague Cooke. The ceremony was officiated by Liliʻuokalani and Elizabeth Kekaʻaniau, the last surviving members of the Royal School. On the memorial, her name was written as "Mary Paaaina".

=== Descendants ===
Griswold's and Paʻaʻāina's only child was Mary Paʻaʻāina Griswold (March 19, 1853 – June 9, 1917). She married twice: her first marriage was to Lewis Albert (1826–1897) in San Francisco, 1871, and her second marriage was to Charles Ellet Kellogg (1855–1920) in Honolulu, April 15, 1886. Mary Griswold lived in California for most of her adult life and died in Oakland. By her first marriage, Mary Griswold had a daughter named Edith G. Albert (1872–1948), who married William Buchanan (1865–1940) and resided in California. No children are mentioned in Buchanan's 1948 obituary in The San Franciscio Examiner or in any United States Census records between 1900 and 1940.

== See also ==
- John Young (Hawaii) family tree

== Bibliography ==
- Brown, Marie Alohalani (December 2014). Facing the Spears of Change: the Life and Legacy of Ioane Kaneiakama Papa ʻĪʻī (Thesis). Honolulu: University of Hawaii at Manoa. hdl:10125/101056.
- Cooke, Amos Starr; Cooke, Juliette Montague (1937). Richards, Mary Atherton (ed.). The Chiefs' Children School: A Record Compiled from the Diary and Letters of Amos Starr Cooke and Juliette Montague Cooke, by Their Granddaughter Mary Atherton Richards. Honolulu: Honolulu Star-Bulletin. OCLC 1972890.
- Gilman, Gorham D. (1970). Sharpless, Jean S.; Greer, Richard A. (eds.). "1848 – Honolulu As It Is – Notes for Amplification". The Hawaiian Journal of History. 4. Honolulu: Hawaiian Historical Society: 105–156. hdl:10524/253. OCLC 60626541.
- Griswold Family Association of America; French, Robert Lewis (2001). The Griswold Family: the Sixth & Seventh Generations, Edward & Matthew. Griswold Family Association.
- Hopkins, Timothy (1903). The Kelloggs in the Old World and the New. Vol. 2. San Francisco: Sunset Press and Photo Engraving Co.
- Kanahele, George S. (1999). Emma: Hawaii's Remarkable Queen. Honolulu: University of Hawaii Press. ISBN 978-0-8248-2240-8.
- Liliuokalani (1898). Hawaii's Story by Hawaii's Queen, Liliuokalani. Boston: Lee and Shepard. ISBN 978-0-548-22265-2.
- Menton, Linda K. (1981). "The Royal School 1839–1850". Educational Perspectives. The Journal of the University of Hawaii at Mānoa. 20 (3). Honolulu: University of Hawaii: 17–21. hdl:10125/47174. ISSN 0013-1849. OCLC 220851876.
- Van Dyke, Jon M. (2008). Who Owns the Crown Lands of Hawaiʻi?. Honolulu: University of Hawaii Press. ISBN 978-0-8248-3211-7.
- Wyllie, Robert Crichton (1845). "Notes on the Sandwich, Or Hawaiian Islands". In Simmonds, P. L. (ed.). Simmond's Colonial Magazine and Foreign Miscellany. London: Simmonds and Ward. pp. 125–139. OCLC 405778069.
