= Julia Alapaʻi =

High chieftess of the Kingdom of Hawaiʻi (c. 1814–1849)

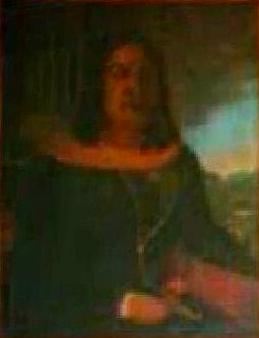
- Portrait of Julia Alapaʻi.
- Born: c. 1814
- Died: August 2, 1849; Honolulu, Oahu
- Burial: August 24, 1849; Pohukaina Tomb; October 30, 1865; Royal Mausoleum at Mauna ʻAla
- Spouse: Keoni Ana
- Father: Nāhili
- Mother: Kauwaʻa

Julia Alapaʻi Kauwaʻa (c. 1814 – August 2, 1849) was a high chiefess of the Kingdom of Hawaii. Her name has been given as Julia Alapaʻi Kauwa and sometimes as Juliana instead.

== Life ==
Born in circa 1814, her father was High Chief Nāhili and her mother was High Chiefess Kauwaʻa. Nāhili was the sailing master for Kamehameha I and considered one of his most brilliant generals, instrumental in the latter's victory at the Battle of Nuʻuanu. During the last days of the wars of unification, he was sent along with Keaweopu and Isaac Davis to Kauaʻi where they successfully convinced King Kaumualiʻi to surrender control of the island in 1819. Her mother was the youngest daughter of King Alapaʻinui and his wife Kamaua. Alapaʻinui was the king of the island of Hawaiʻi prior to the accession of Kalaniʻōpuʻu, who, fearful of the prophecy of the birth of a "killer of chiefs", had tried to kill the baby Kamehameha at his birth. Her sister was Kaulunae, who married Kanehiwa and was the mother of Lipoa and Julia Moemalie. She also had a half-brother named Kaniukahi, the son of her father Nahili by another wife named Nakaiwahine, who became one of the companions of Prince Liholiho, the later King Kamehameha II.

Alternatively, her grandfather has been given as Alapaʻimaloiki, the nephew of Alapaʻinui, son of Alapaʻinui's half-brother kapu chief Keawepoepoe, the son of Kauaian chief Lonoikahaupu and Hawaiian chiefess Kalanikauleleiaiwi, by his wife Kūmaʻaikū. Alapaʻimaloiki was the half-brother of royal twins Kamanawa and Kameʻeiamoku, and full-blooded brother of Keʻeaumoku Pāpaʻiahiahi, the three trusted advisors of Kamehameha I who helped him united the Hawaiian islands. Thus, she would have been a close relative of the powerful Queen Kaʻahumanu, who served as kuhina nui and regent for King Kamehameha II and Kamehameha III.

She became a close friend and attendant (similar to a European lady-in-waiting) of Princess Nāhiʻenaʻena, the youngest daughter of Kamehameha I and his most sacred wife Keōpūolani, and the sister of King Kamehameha II and Kamehameha III. During her youth, she, along with other attendants of the princess, the chiefesses Jane Lahilahi, Laura Kōnia, Ulumāheihei, Polupolu, and Kapoli, were punished by Queen Kaʻahumanu for breaking Christian laws and corrupting the young King Kamehameha III, who had ascended the throne after his brother's untimely death in London.

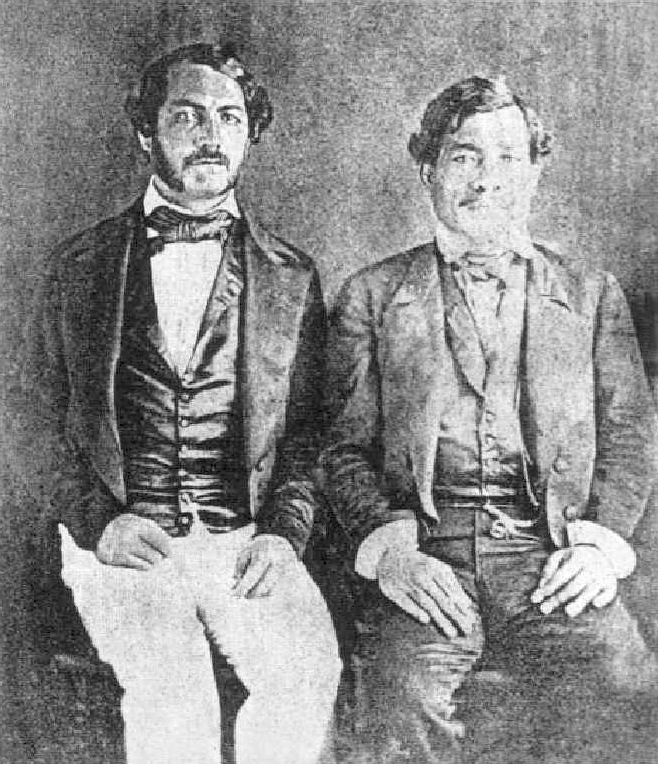
Keoni Ana and Kamehameha III, c. 1850

She married John Kaleipaihala Young II, more commonly known as Keoni Ana, the son of Kamehameha I's most trusted advisor John Young and a childhood companion of Kamehameha III. The couple remained childless, so, in 1836, they adopted in the Hawaiian tradition of hānai their nephew Peter Kaʻeo, the son of Joshua Kaʻeo and Jane Lahilahi, her husband's sister. They also hānai her niece Julia Moemalie.

Christian law lapsed for a period of time after the death of Kaʻahumanu and Hoapili, the strongest supporters of the new faith. The court and capital of the Kingdom was still centered at Mokuʻula and Hale Piula in Lahaina. During this time, it was said that Alapaʻi became a mistress of Kamehameha III along with her husband's' sister Jane Lahilahi while Keoni Ana had an affair with the king's wife Queen Kalama. This kind of relationship, common in Ancient Hawaii, reflected the traditional punalua ("two springs"), which involved "the fact that two or more brothers with their wives, or two or more sisters with their husbands, were inclined to possess each other in common".

Both Alapaʻi and her husband were trusted advisors of the king and Kamehameha III included them in his counsel. She served in the House of Nobles, the upper house of the Hawaiian legislature, from 1845 to 1849, and served as a member of the Privy Council from 1848 to 1849. While most women in the United States had few rights, a considerable number of Hawaiian chiefesses were active in politic. An anonymous journalist of the Boston Atlas in a letter to editor wrote about the first official opening of the Hawaiian legislature in Honolulu in 1845:

... the effect of the whole was made the more pleasing by the rich and tasteful attire of some 50 to 100 ladies present. The female chiefs here, by the constitution of the country, take an active part in governmental affairs; are governors and peeresses by birth. For this occasion they turned out in all their strength, and if I cannot say beauty, although some are very passable, particularly the Queen, Mrs. Young and Mrs. Rooke, I may add size; for to no inconsiderable weight of influence they add weight of body, and all have waists that would carry envy through the most populous harem of Stamboul. I do not think their average weight can be less than 200 or 225 each. However, they were dressed with excellent taste, and appeared to very good advantage.

== Death and legacy ==
Alapaʻi died suddenly on August 2, 1849 of apoplexy just before the invasion of Honolulu by French naval captain Louis Tromelin. Her death prompted both her husband and the King to return to the capital from Hilo just in time to address the political crisis. Alapai Street in Honolulu is named after her. A painting of her hangs next to the baby grand piano in the parlor at Hānaiakamalama, the residence that her husband lived in after her death, which later became the summer palace of their niece Queen Emma, the wife of Kamehameha IV. Her lands eventually became part of the estates of Queen Emma which are now part of the trust of The Queen's Medical Center, the hospital that Emma helped established. She was probably interred at the Royal Mausoleum at Mauna ʻAla.

== Bibliography ==
- Apple, Russel A. (1978). "Appendix A: Young Family Geneology". Pahukanilua: Homestead of John Young: Kawaihae, Kohala, Island of Hawaiʻi : Historical Data Section of the Historic Structure Report. Honolulu: National Park Office, Hawaii State Office. pp. 39–41. OCLC 4962701.
- Biographical Sketch of His Majesty King Kalakaua. Honolulu: P. C. Advertiser Steam Printing Office. 1884. pp. 72–74. OCLC 12787107.
- Clark, T. Blake (March 1939). "Honolulu's Streets". Papers of the Hawaiian Historical Society (20). Honolulu: The Bulletin Publishing Company: 5–25. hdl:10524/967. OCLC 1773152.
- Dwight, Theodore, ed. (1846). American Penny Magazine, and Family Newspaper. Vol. 2. New York: s.n. OCLC 10346946.
- Gilman, Gorman D. (1904). Thrum, Thomas G. (ed.). "Streets of Honolulu in the Early Forties". Hawaiian Almanac and Annual for 1904. Honolulu: Honolulu Star-Bulletin. pp. 74–101. hdl:10524/31853.
- Fornander, Abraham (1880). Stokes, John F. G. (ed.). An Account of the Polynesian Race: Its Origins and Migrations, and the Ancient History of the Hawaiian People to the Times of Kamehameha I. Vol. 2. London: Trubner & Company. OCLC 4823096.
- Hawaii (1918). Lydecker, Robert Colfax (ed.). Roster Legislatures of Hawaii, 1841–1918. Honolulu: Hawaiian Gazette Company. OCLC 60737418.
- Ii, John Papa; Pukui, Mary Kawena; Barrère, Dorothy B. (1983). Fragments of Hawaiian History (2 ed.). Honolulu: Bishop Museum Press. ISBN 978-0-910240-31-4. OCLC 251324264.
- Judd, Laura Fish (1880). Honolulu: Sketches of Life: Social, Political, and Religious, in the Hawaiian Islands from 1828-1861. With a Supplementary Sketch of Events to the Present Time. New York: Anson D. F. Randolph & Company. OCLC 300479.
- Kamakau, Samuel (1992) [1961]. Ruling Chiefs of Hawaii (Revised ed.). Honolulu: Kamehameha Schools Press. ISBN 0-87336-014-1. OCLC 25008795.
- Kameʻeleihiwa, Lilikalā (1992). Native Land and Foreign Desires. Honolulu: Bishop Museum Press. ISBN 0-930897-59-5. OCLC 154146650.
- Silverman, Jane (1972). "Young Paiea". The Hawaiian Journal of History. 6. Honolulu: Hawaiian Historical Society: 91–106. hdl:10524/477. OCLC 60626541.
- Smith, Bradford (1956). Yankees in Paradise: the New England Impact on Hawaii. Philadelphia: J. B. Lippincott. OCLC 1439742.
- Sterling, Elspeth P.; Summers, Catherine C. (1978). Sites of Oahu. Honolulu: Bishop Museum Press. ISBN 0-910240-73-6. OCLC 5189857.
- Westermarck, Edward (1922). The History of Human Marriage. New York: Allerton Book Company. OCLC 528778.
- Wichman, Frederick B. (2003). Nā Pua Aliʻi O Kauaʻi: Ruling Chiefs of Kauaʻi. Honolulu: University of Hawaii Press. ISBN 978-0-8248-2638-3. OCLC 50560589.
- Wong, Helen; Rayson, Ann (1987). Hawaii's Royal History. Honolulu: Bess Press. ISBN 978-0-935848-48-9. OCLC 18050829.
