= Keliʻimaikaʻi =

High Chief and brother of Kamehameha I (c. 1765–1809)

- Born: c. 1765
- Died: November 14, 1809
- Burial: Mauna ʻAla Royal Mausoleum
- Spouse: Kiʻilaweau (w); Kalikoʻokalani
- Issue: Kekuaokalani; Kaʻōanaʻeha Kuamoʻo
Names
- Kalanimālokuloku-i-Kepoʻokalani Keliʻimaikaʻi
- House: House of Keoua; House of Keliimaikai
- Father: Keōua
- Mother: Kekuiapoiwa II

Kalanimālokuloku-i-Kepoʻokalani Keliʻimaikaʻi (c. 1765–1809) was a High Chief and the most popular brother of Kamehameha the Great, who founded the Kingdom of Hawaii.

He was generally credited as an ancestor of Queen Emma of Hawaii, the consort of Kamehameha IV, a candidate for the Royal Election of 1872. His name Keliʻimaikaʻi in the Hawaiian language means "The Good Chief". Sometimes his name is spelled Kealiʻimaikaʻi. or by visiting Europeans as Tidi Miti or Tereameteʻe. He is sometimes called a Prince due his relation to Kamehameha. He was also the Chief Priest of ʻIo and Kāne.

== Life ==
Keliʻimaikaʻi was born in around the year 1765. His mother was the High Chiefess Kekuiapoiwa II of the Kona district and father was High Chief Keōua of the Kohala district. His only full brother was Kamehameha I, although he had many half-siblings through his parents' other marriages. His father Keōua was the grandson of Keaweʻīkekahialiʻiokamoku, who had once ruled a large portion of the island of Hawaiʻi. After his death the island erupted into civil war and Alapainui, a chief of Kohala, gained the upper hand and dispossessed his father of his lands. Kekuʻiapoiwa II was daughter of Haʻae-a-Mahi, the brother of Alapainui. His kahu (guardian) is said to have been Koʻoluaaliʻiolaʻi.e. and her husband, Kaha Kūʻaikea (the brother of Kahaʻōhulani, guardian to Kamehameha I).

When he grew up and king Alapainui was long dead, he assisted his brother in unifying the Big Island of Hawaii. Keliʻimaikaʻi was known for his kindness, compassion, and mercy to his enemies. For this reason he was Kamehameha's most popular brother. The story of how he came to be known as Keliʻimaikaʻi ("the Good Chief") shows the mercy he showed to his foes. Around 1775, he was sent on an expedition to conquer the lands and confiscate properties in the Kipahulu and Hana districts of the Island of Maui, under the rule of the Maui king Kahekili II. The two districts had been formerly owned by their deceased half-brother, Kalokuokamaile. Kamehameha requested that their widow sister-in-law, Kaloiokalani, give the guardianship of the land and her daughter Kaohelelani to Keliʻimaikaʻi. Although there may have been some resistance, Keliʻimaikaʻi was victorious. Instead of punishing the people who had opposed him, he respected their rights and property. As stated by Hawaiian historian Samuel Kamakau: "There was no sugar cane broken off, no potatoes dug up, no pigs roasted." The makaʻāinana (common people) loved him and called him "the Good Chief" by which he was ever after known."

He was so highly thought of that he was the only chief that was not allowed to work on the construction of the Puʻukohola Heiau lest it defile his sacred status. The historian, John Papa ʻĪʻī, Keliʻimaikaʻi's mana (spiritual power) was so great that "whatever he dedicated became very kapu", two examples were the bathing pools in Kawaihae, called Keliʻialalahoʻolaʻawai and Alawai.

Keliʻimaikaʻi died November 14, 1809, months before the final unification of Hawaiian Islands. Reportedly the only person allowed to see him on his deathbed was his daughter.

== Marriage and children ==
He married his half sister Kiʻilaweau. By Kiʻilaweau he had Kekuaokalani (d. 1819).

He also married the High Chiefess Kalikoʻokalani, daughter of High Chief Kekuaʻalaimoku and High Chiefess Kanenuiakalani. Her father was the son of Kalaninuiamamao and half brother of both Kalaniʻōpuʻu and High Chief Keawemauhili. By Kalikoʻokalani, he had Kaʻōanaʻeha (1780–1850) who married John Young Olohana, a former British sailor and trusted advisor of Kamehameha, and mother a dynasty of Hapa-Haole nobility.

During the 1880s, King Kalākaua had his own genealogist publish an article denouncing Samuel M. Kamakau's genealogy linking Queen Emma to Keliʻimaikaʻi. The genealogist argued that Keliʻimaikaʻi "himself denied publicly that he had a child named Kaoanaeha" and "that it was accepted by the chiefs of that time...[So] how can SMK [Samuel M. Kamakau] turn the truth into a lie, when he knows the true genealogy of the Queen?" Even ten years after the accession of Kalākaua, the genealogy battle continued because there were still threats that Queen Emma's supporters, called Queenites or Emmaites, would place her on the throne. Emma's supporters contradicted Kalākaua's claims and said instead that Keliʻimaikaʻi had recognized Kaʻōanaʻeha as his daughter. Queen Emma was never quoted on her opinion in these arguments. Neither were the views of Queen Liliʻuokalani known until the publication of her autobiography. Liliʻuokalani claimed that Keliʻimaikaʻi had no children, that Kiʻilaweau, Keliʻimaikaʻi's first wife, was a man, and that Kaʻōanaʻeha was the daughter of High Chief Kalaipaihala, instead. This and other claims may have intended to belittle Queen Emma because the House of Kalākaua lacked the lineage and support of the Hawaiian people that she possessed.

== Ancestry ==
Ancestors of Keliʻimaikaʻi

16. Kanaloaikaiwilena Kapūlehu =#28
8. Keaweʻīkekahialiʻiokamoku =#14
17. Keakealaniwahine =#19, 27, 29, 31
4. Keʻeaumoku Nui
18. Kāneikaiwilani =#26, 30
9. Kalanikauleleāiwi =#13, 15
19. Keakealaniwahine =#17, 27, 29, 31
2. Keōua Kalanikūpuapaikalaninui
20. Nuʻuanu
10. Kū-a-Nuʻuanau
21. Kealomākō
5. Kamakaʻimoku
22. Mahiolole =#24
11. ʻUmiʻula-a-Kaʻahumanu
23. Kānekūkaʻailani =#25
1. Keliʻimaikaʻi
24. Mahiolole =#22
12. Kauaua-a-Mahi
25. Kānekūkaʻailani =#23
6. Hāʻae-a-Mahi
26. Kāneikaiwilani =#18, 30
13. Kalanikauleleaiwi =#9, 15
27. Keakealaniwahine =#17, 19, 29, 31
3. Kekūʻiapoiwa II
28. Kanaloaikaiwilena Kapūlehu =#16
14. Keaweʻīkekahialiʻiokamoku =#8
29. Keakealaniwahine =#17, 19, 27, 31
7. Kekelakekeokalani-a-Keawe
30. Kāneikaiwilani =#18, 26
15. Kalanikauleleaiwi =#9, 13
31. Keakealaniwahine =#17, 19, 27, 29
