= Keʻeaumoku II =

Hawaiian soldier and Governor of Maui (1784–1824)

Cox Keʻeaumoku II
- Governor of Maui
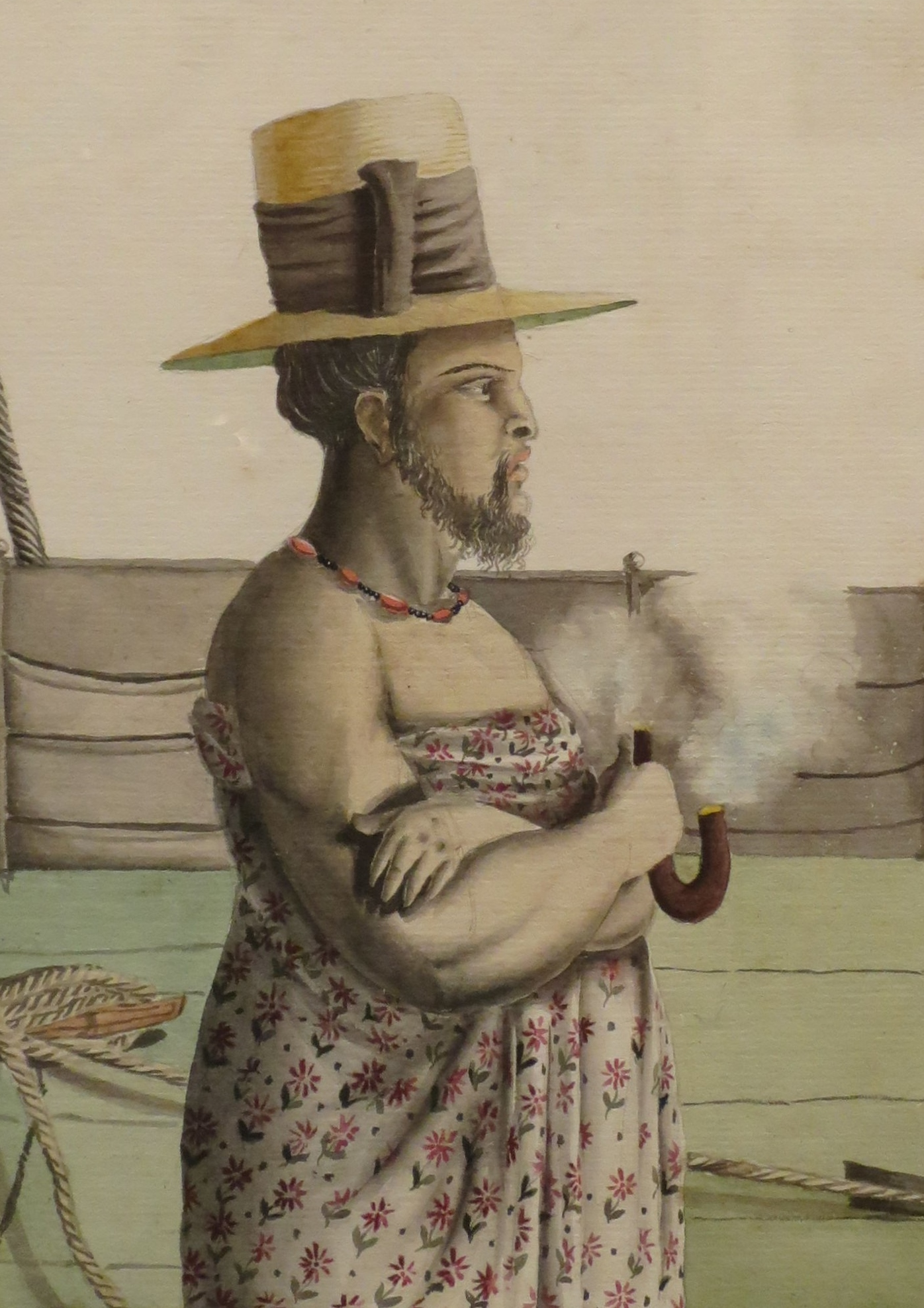
- Governor Cox of Maui, ink and watercolor over graphite by Adrien Taunay the Younger, 1819
- Born: 1784
- Died: March 23, 1824 (aged 39–40); Honolulu
- Burial: Kailua-Kona
- Spouse: Kekuaiaea; Akahi; Peleuli II ʻIkanaka-o-Kikilo; Ku; Grace Kamaʻikuʻi Young
Names
- "George Cox" Kahekili Keʻeaumoku II
- Father: Chief Keʻeaumoku Pāpaʻiahiahi
- Mother: Nāmāhānaʻi Kaleleokalani

George Cox Kahekili Keʻeaumoku II or Keʻeaumoku ʻOpio (1784–1824) was part of an influential family at the time of the founding of the Kingdom of Hawaii. he served as a military leader, and then became a convert to Christianity and Royal Governor of Maui. He is sometimes called Keʻeaumoku III if Keʻeaumoku Nui is counted as Keʻeaumoku I and Keʻeaumoku Pāpaʻiahiahi is counted Keʻeaumoku II instead.

== Life ==
He was born probably in 1784. His father was Keʻeaumoku Pāpaʻiahiahi (1736–1804), a noble from Hawaiʻi Island, and his mother was Nāmāhānaʻi Kaleleokalani, the wife of her half-brother the King of Maui, Kamehameha Nui. From his mother he was a related to many of the kings of Maui.

His father had been a counsellor and supporter of Kamehameha I during his early years. As the eldest son of Keʻeaumoku, he succeed his father as a counsellor during the last years of Kamehameha's campaigns in 1804. He was appointed governor of Maui and adjacent islands of Molokaʻi, Lānaʻi and Kahoʻolawe by Kamehameha I, also taking over for his father. Some early writers spell his name "Keaumoku". He served as Commander and Admiral of the King's Fleet and fought in the Battle of Nu'uanu along with Isaac Davis.

His siblings became notable leaders in various roles. His older sister Kaʻahumanu became a Queen consort of Kamehameha I, and after Kamehameha I's death served as Queen Regent. Another older sister Queen Kalākua Kaheiheimālie, and a younger sister Lydia Namahana Piʻia also became royal wives. Younger brother Kalua-i-Konahale Kuakini took the name "John Adams" and became Royal Governor of Hawaiʻi island.

As the custom with royalty of the time, he took multiple wives. His first two were Kekuauaea and Akahi, the aunt who later willed her vast lands to Bernice Pauahi Bishop. Around 1821 he became the first husband of Grace Kamaʻikuʻi Young when she was in her teens, later the foster mother of Emma Rooke.

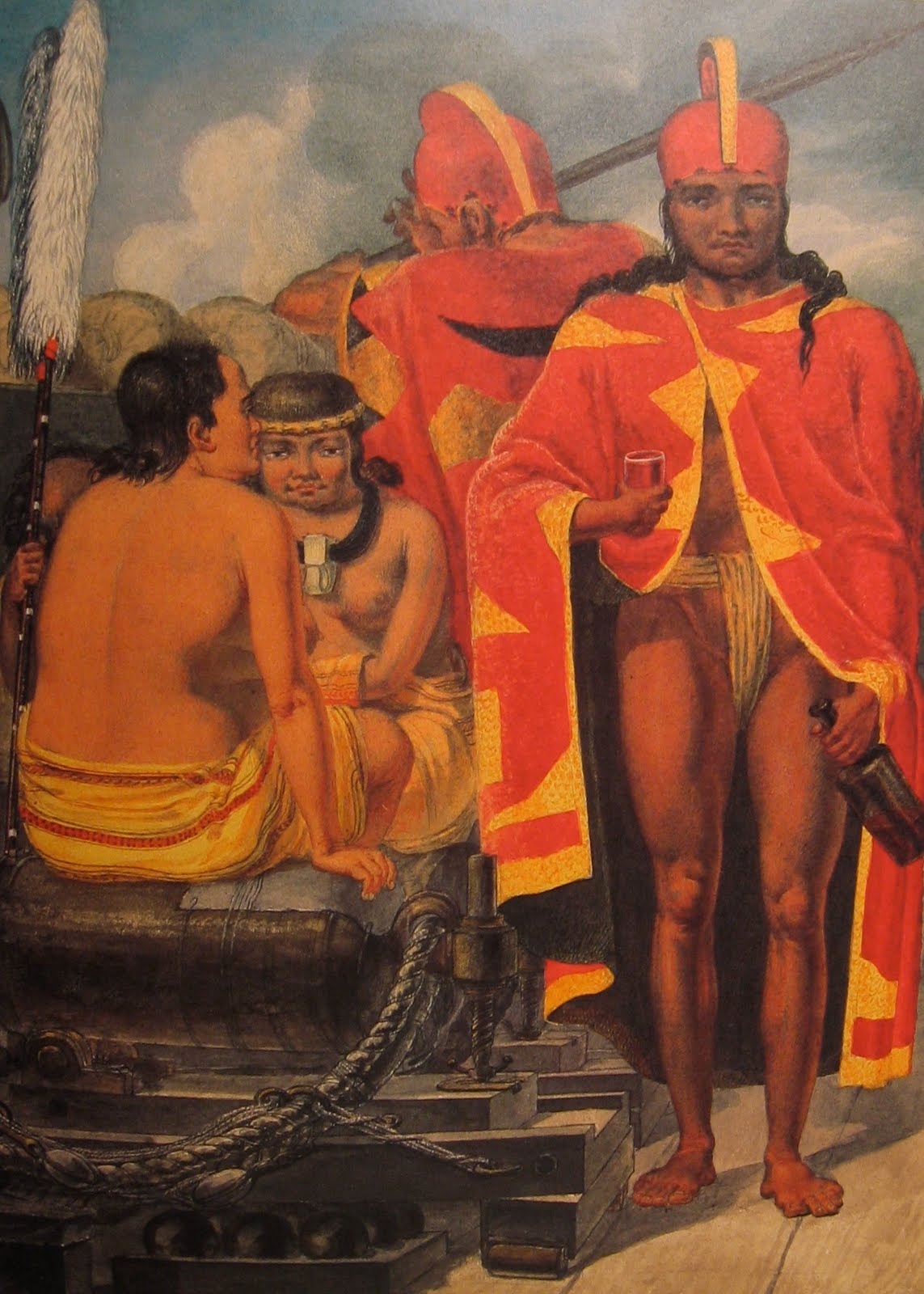
Keeaumoku, facing away, and Boki on the Russian schooner Kamchatka by Mikhail Tikhanov.

His reputation for extracting as much tax as the commoners could bear led to his nickname Puʻu Nui ("Great Pile"). The name refers to the rotting piles of excess goods outside his storehouses. In the true Hawaiian double entendre, the name also accurately described his physique: members of his family were known to be enormous.

He took the name "Cox", after the first British sea captain to befriend him, Harold Cox, and "George" after King King George IV. He was usually called "Governor Cox" by foreigners. He learned English, and considered a friend of the European and American traders. The Maui port of Lāhainā became a popular port of call for whaling ships in his tenure, and served as capital of the kingdom 1820–1845. Captain Harold Cox would marry into Hawaiian royalty, and his daughter would marry Chief Hoʻolulu, another former Kamehameha advisor.

He was among the first to house the Protestant missionaries that had arrived from Boston in 1820. His knowledge of English made him a valuable interpreter. He attended public worship and collected the people together by ringing a large bell. They devised a writing system and he quickly learned to read and write.

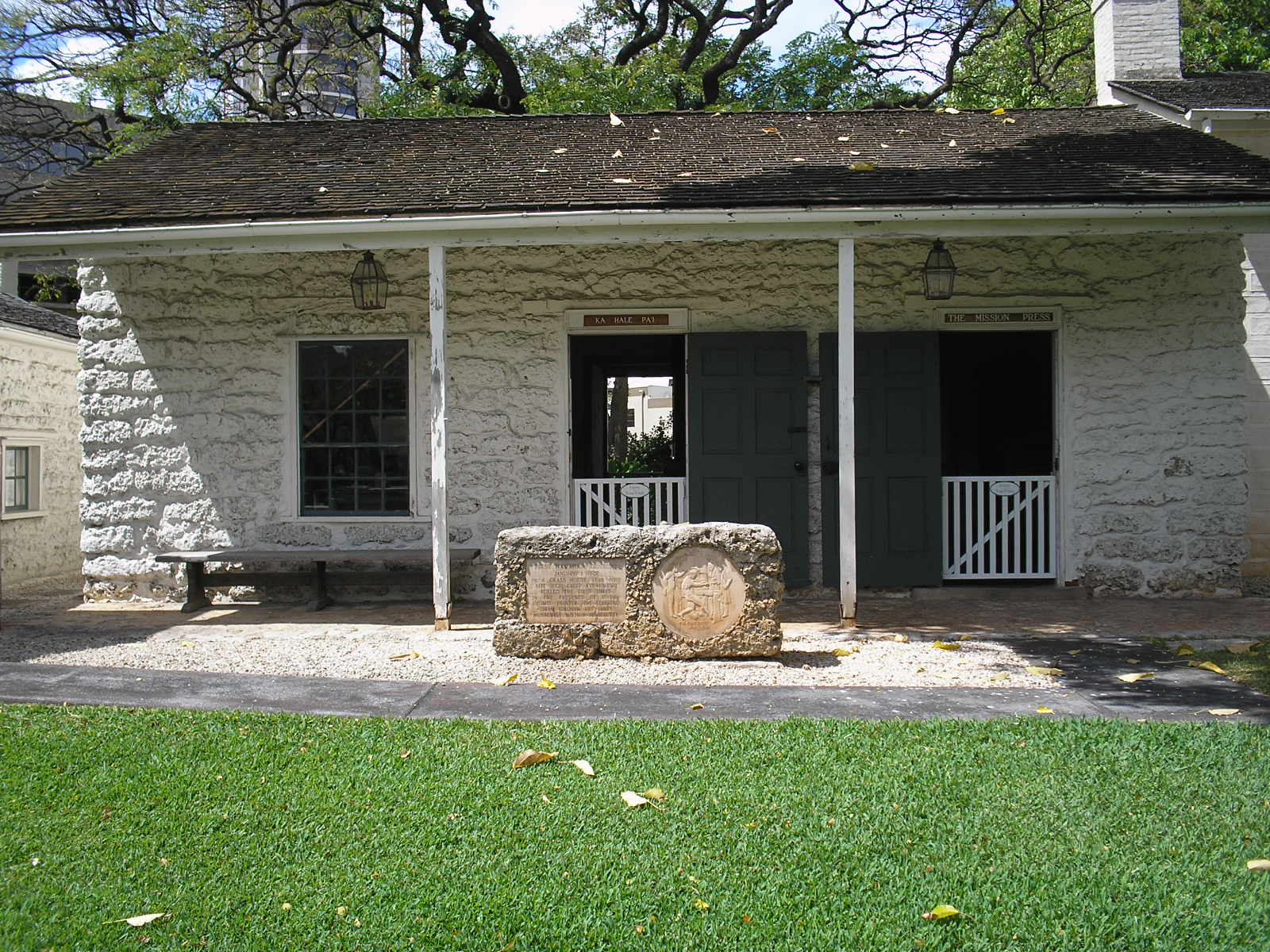
Plaque commemorating the site of the first printing in Hawaii.

The first printing was done in a grass-roofed hut in Honolulu at the site that is now Kawaiahaʻo Church in the afternoon of January 7, 1822. The lever to begin the printing process was pulled by Keʻeaumoku in the presence of Elisha Loomis, printer; the reverend Hiram Bingham; and James Hunnewell, mission benefactor. This first printing was the beginning of the Mission Press, which eventually printed millions of pages, most in the Hawaiian language.

An English visitor in 1821 gives the following account of Keʻeaumoku II:

This morning I went to Cox,... I expected to find him, as usual, either sleeping, or smoking, or drinking, or busy trafficking like myself. The door of his hut was half open, and I was about to enter unceremoniously, when a scene, too striking ever to be forgotten, and which would require the hand of a master painter to do it justice suddenly arrested my attention.

About a dozen natives, of both sexes, were seated in a circle on the matted floor of the apartment, and, in the midst of them, sat John Honoree the Hawaiian catechist. All eyes were bent upon him; and the variously expressive features of each individual marked the degree of interest which had been excited in his mind. So absorbed, indeed, were they in the business which had assembled them, that my abrupt appearance at the door, created for some time neither interruption nor remark. The speaker held in his hand the Gospel of St. John, as published at Tahiti, and was endeavouring, by signs and familiar illustrations, to render its contents easy of comprehension. His simple yet energetic manner added weight to his opinion, and proved that he spoke, from personal conviction, the sincere and unpremeditated language of the heart.

The Chief himself stood in the back ground, a little apart from the rest, leaning upon the shoulder of an attendant. A gleam of light suddenly fell upon his countenance, and disclosed features on which wonder, anxiety, and seriousness, were imprinted in the strongest characters. He wore no other dress than the malo round his waist; but his tall athletic form, and dignified demeanour, marked at one glance his rank and superiority over all around. One hand was raised instinctively to his head, in apensive attitude; his knitted brows bespoke intense thought, and his piercing eyes were fixed upon the speaker, with an inquiring, penetrating look, as much as to say, 'Can what you say be really true?' I gazed for some moments with mute astonishment, turning my regards from one to the other, and dreading to intrude upon the privacy of persons so usefully employed. At last, the chief turned round, and motioned with his hand, in a dignified manner, for me to withdraw. I did so; but carried away in my heart the remembrance of a scene, to which the place, the people and the occasion, united in attaching a peculiar interest.

I learned, afterwards, that Cox had promised to build a school house, and present it to the missionaries for their use. A donation, which, considering his acknowledged love of money, affords no mean proof that his inquiries into the truth of the new religion had not been altogether fruitless.

== Illness and death ==
He suffered frequent attacks of disease in the last years. The illness which immediately preceded his dissolution was painful, and somewhat protracted. At first some of the chiefs believed him to be suffering from sorcery. He was brought to the island of Oahu to be treated by foreign physicians. It was there missionary William Ellis visited him daily and sometimes observed him praying. He wished to be baptized on his deathbed. Ellis thought it proper to decline, or he and the Hawaiians would think there was a saving efficacy connect to that Christian rite or that it would secure the soul's acceptance with God. He died at Pakaka in Honolulu, Oahu on March 23, 1824. His brother Kuakini had his body moved back by ship to Kailua-Kona on the night of his death, leaving Reverend Bingham to conduct his funeral service over an empty coffin. A funeral was held in Kuakini's house where the chiefs gathered to mourn and the Reverend Asa Thurston and Bishop attended prayers for him.

== Ancestry ==
Ancestors of Keʻeaumoku II

16. Kauakahilau
8. Lonoikahaupu
17. Kuluina
4. Keawepoepoe
18. Kaneikauaiwilani
9. Kalanikauleleiaiwi (= 29)
19. Keakealaniwahine
2. Keʻeaumoku Pāpaʻiahiahi
5. Kūmaʻaikū
1. Keʻeaumoku II
24. Lonohonuakini
12. Kaulahea II
25. Kalanikauanakinilani
6. Kekaulike
26. ʻUmi-a-Liloa of Maui
13. Papaikaniau
27. Kuʻihewamakawalu
3. NāmāhānaʻiʻKaleleokalani
28. Kauaua-a-Mahi
14. Haʻae-a-Mahi
29. Kalanikauleleiaiwi (= 9)
7. Haʻaloʻu
30. Kaulahea II (= 12)
15. Kalelemauliokalani
31. Papaikaniau (= 13)

== External Resources ==
- The Hawaiian Imprint Collection From the Library of Congress has the first publications from the island which were printed from Missionary Elisha Loomis' printing press.

Preceded by Keʻeaumoku Pāpaʻiahiahi	Royal Governor of Maui; 1804–1824	Succeeded by Kahakuhaʻakoi Wahinepio
