= George Kanahele =

Native Hawaiian activist, historian and author

- Born: October 17, 1930; Kahuku
- Died: September 15, 2000 (aged 69); Guam
- Education: Ph.D., Cornell University, 1967; M.A., Brigham Young University; B.A., Brigham Young University
- Occupation(s): Activist, historian, author

George Huʻeu Sanford Kanahele (October 17, 1930 – September 15, 2000) was a native Hawaiian activist, historian and author.

== Biography ==
George Huʻeu Sanford Kanahele was born October 17, 1930, in Kahuku on the island of Oʻahu of Hawaii. Kanahele graduated from Kamehameha Schools in 1948, and served as missionary for the Church of Jesus Christ of Latter-day Saints in Japan until 1954. He then served in the United States Army Security Agency in Germany.

Kanahele received his Bachelor's and master's degrees in political science from Brigham Young University Hawaiʻi, and Ph.D. in Government and Southeast Asian Affairs from Cornell University in 1967, graduating from Cornell with academic honors.

Kanahele published several books during his life relating to Hawaiian culture and history. As co-founder of the Hawaiʻi Entrepreneurship Training & Development Institute, he trained indigenous people around the world in how to start sustainable businesses.

Kanahele founded of the Native Hawaiian Hospitality Association in 1997. Despite being a valuable part of the Hawaiian activism movement, some of his ideas are controversial, such as his argument that native Hawaiians should embrace Hawaii's tourism by helping the visitor industry revive a "Hawaiianess," also described as "a Hawaiian sense of place," in visitor destinations such as Waikīkī. In 1998 he received the Living Treasures of Hawai'i award.

He died in Guam on September 14, 2000, after a heart attack while teaching a seminar.

== Publications ==
- "The Japanese occupation of Indonesia: prelude to independence". Cornell University Microfilms. May 1967. Ph.D. Dissertation
- "The Hawaiian Renaissance". Polynesian Voyaging Society. May 1979. Archived from the original on 2018-09-15.
- Hawaiian music and musicians: an illustrated history. University of Hawaii Press. 1979 [1986]. ISBN 978-0-8248-0578-4.
- Kanahele, George S.; Berger, John, eds. (2012) [1979]. Hawaiian Music & Musicians (2nd ed.). Honolulu, HI, USA: Mutual Publishing. ISBN 9781566479677. OCLC 808415079. Archived from the original on 2012-10-25.
- Pauahi: the Kamehameha legacy. Kamehameha Schools Press. 2002 [1986]. ISBN 0-87336-005-2.
- Hawaiian values for the hospitality industry. WAIAHA Foundation. 1992. ISBN 978-1-881332-00-8.
- Kū kanaka, stand tall: a search for Hawaiian values. University of Hawaii Press. 1993 [1986]. ISBN 978-0-8248-1500-4.
- Waikīkī, 100 B.C. to 1900 A.D.: an untold story. University of Hawaii Press. 1995. ISBN 978-0-8248-1790-9.
- Emma: Hawai'i's Remarkable Queen: a Biography. University of Hawaii Press. 1999. ISBN 978-0-8248-2240-8.
