= Kaʻauwai =

Kaʻauwai or Kaauwai may refer to:

- Zorobabela Kaʻauwai (c. 1799/1806–1856), a Supreme Court judge and politician of the Kingdom of Hawaii.
- David Kahalekula Kaʻauwai (died 1856), politician and legislator of the Kingdom of Hawaii.
- William Hoapili Kaʻauwai (1882–1958), politician and legislator of the Kingdom of Hawaii.
- Mary Ann Kiliwehi Kaʻauwai (1840–1873), a Hawaiian high chiefess and lady-in-waiting to Queen Emma.
- Elizabeth Kahanu Kaʻauwai (1970–1932), Hawaiian princess
