= Pius F. Koakanu =

Hawaiian high chief (died 1885)

Member of the Kingdom of Hawaii House of Representatives for the island of Kauai
- In office 1868, 1874

Keeper of the Royal Mausoleum
- In office ? – March 2, 1885
- Preceded by: Haumea
- Succeeded by: Lanihau

Personal details
- Died: March 2, 1885 Nuʻuanu, Oʻahu. Kingdom of Hawaii
- Spouse: Peke
- Parent(s): Namaile and Kuini Liliha

Pius F. Koakanu (sometimes known as John F. Koakanu or Koakanu II; died March 2, 1885) was a Hawaiian high chief (aliʻi) from the island of Kauai who served as a politician during the Kingdom of Hawaii and the Kahu or Keeper of the Royal Mausoleum of Hawaii at Mauna ʻAla.

== Life and career ==
Koakanu was the son of Namaile and the influential High Chiefess Kuini Liliha, who served as Governor of Oahu from 1829 to 1831 and was also the hānai (adoptive) daughter of Hoapili, a confidante of King Kamehameha I. He shared name with his maternal grandfather Koakanu. Through his mother, he was descended from the ancient kings of Hawaii Island and the Moi of Maui. His full siblings were Abigail Maheha and Kailinoa while his half-siblings were Jane Loeau, Aberahama Kaikioewa Palekaluhi, and Mary Ann Kiliwehi. Two of his sisters Jane and Abigail studied at the Chiefs' Children's School, also known as the Royal School, a select school for the royal children of the highest rank who were chosen by Kamehameha III to be eligible for the throne of the Kingdom of Hawaii. Koakanu was considered a high chief of Kauai and resided at Koloa.

Koakanu served as a member of the House of Representatives for Koloa, Kauai in the Legislature of the Kingdom of Hawaii. He was first elected as an Independent candidate against Kaiu, the Government candidate, for the regular session of 1868, which ran from April 18 to June 24. Koakanu did not serve in the next two session and William Hyde Rice was elected instead as Koloa's representative for the 1870 and 1872 sessions. Koakanu was re-elected in 1874 and served the special session and regular session of 1874. In 1874, after the death of Lunalilo without an heir, a monarchical election was held to decide who would succeed to the throne; Koakanu participated in the special session of the legislature which voted thirty-nine to six in favor of Kalākaua over Queen Dowager Emma as the second elected monarch of Hawaii. The subsequent announcement to the public triggered the Honolulu Courthouse riot as Emmaite supporters hunted down and attacked native legislators who supported Kalākaua. As one of the legislators to vote for Kalākaua, Koakanu was beaten by the rioters. Historian Jon Kamakawiwoʻole Osorio noted that "the attacks were conducted by Natives against Natives over issues of loyalty and kanaka identity". The rioters tore apart the courthouse and created makeshift clubs to use as bludgeons. One legislator J. W. Lonoaea later died from his wounds. In order to quell the civil disruption, American and British troops were landed with the permission of the Hawaiian government, and the rioters were arrested. Koakanu recovered and returned on April 30 to serve out his post during the regular session which ended August 8.

In 1877, he and Kalākaua became one of the twelve charter members of the Hui Kawaihau, a business group involved in sugar cultivation near Kapaʻa in eastern Kauai. He unsuccessfully appealed to overturn the Bernice Pauahi Bishop Estate in 1885 by claiming to be an heir-in-law as Pauahi's third cousin (both sharing descent from the Maui King Kamehamehanui Aiʻluau). The appeal was denied on the ground he was too distantly related to the deceased and other closer relations had not expressed their claims. Sometime after the death or replacement of Haumea (who was Kahu since May 3, 1878), Koakanu was appointed as Kahu or Keeper of the Royal Mausoleum of Hawaii at Mauna ʻAla, a position he held until his death.

== Death ==
Koakanu died on March 2, 1885, at Nuʻuanu. His obituaries in the Hawaiian newspapers Ko Hawaii Paeaina and Ka Nupepa Kuokoa noted he was not ill at the time of his death. His obituary in the English newspaper The Pacific Commercial Advertiser noted his fail attempts at overturning the Bishop Estate and stated "his death being caused, as his acquaintance report, by remorse and fear."

Koakanu and his wife Peke had one daughter named Lanihau, who succeed him as Kahu of Mauna ʻAla and later became the last female Governor of Kauai from 1886 to 1888. In an 1873 letter by Queen Emma, she mentioned Koakanu had a mistress although does not name her.

In 1915, the Kauai newspaper The Garden Island featured a piece about the history of Koloa by Kauai-born William Owen Smith. Smith included Koakanu as a prominent Hawaiian in the early history of Koloa: "Among the other prominent Hawaiians were Pius F. Koakanu who was not a very Godly man. He was a fiery speaker and a man of much force."

== Bibliography ==
- Dabagh, Jean; Lyons, Curtis Jere; Hitchcock, Harvey Rexford (1974). Dabagh, Jean (ed.). "A King is Elected: One Hundred Years Ago" (PDF). The Hawaiian Journal of History. 8. Honolulu: Hawaiian Historical Society: 76–89. hdl:10524/112. OCLC 60626541.
- Damon, Ethel Moseley; Isenberg, Mary Dorothea Rice (1931). Koamalu: A Story of Pioneers on Kauai and of What They Built in That Island Garden. Vol. 1. Honolulu: Honolulu Star-Bulletin Press. OCLC 653475.
- Damon, Ethel Moseley (1957). Sanford Ballard Dole and His Hawaii: With an Analysis of Justice Dole's Legal Opinions. Honolulu: Hawaiian Historical Society. OCLC 16335969.
- Fornander, Abraham (1880). Stokes, John F. G. (ed.). An Account of the Polynesian Race: Its Origins and Migrations, and the Ancient History of the Hawaiian People to the Times of Kamehameha I. Vol. 2. London: Trubner & Company. OCLC 4823096.
- Hawaii (1918). Lydecker, Robert Colfax (ed.). Roster Legislatures of Hawaii, 1841–1918. Honolulu: Hawaiian Gazette Company. OCLC 60737418.
- Hawaii. Supreme Court; Judd, C. J. (1887). Estate of Bernice Pauahi Bishop. Appeal from Order of McCully, J. Admitting Will to Probate. Opinion of the Court. Honolulu: Hawaiian Gazette Co. Print. pp. 288–291. OCLC 20831363.
- Kaeo, Peter; Queen Emma (1976). Korn, Alfons L. (ed.). News from Molokai, Letters Between Peter Kaeo & Queen Emma, 1873–1876. Honolulu: The University Press of Hawaii. hdl:10125/39980. ISBN 978-0-8248-0399-5. OCLC 2225064.
- Kamakau, Samuel (1992) [1961]. Ruling Chiefs of Hawaii (Revised ed.). Honolulu: Kamehameha Schools Press. ISBN 0-87336-014-1. OCLC 25008795.
- Kanahele, George S. (1999). Emma: Hawaii's Remarkable Queen. Honolulu: University of Hawaii Press. ISBN 978-0-8248-2240-8. OCLC 40890919.
- Kuykendall, Ralph Simpson (1953). The Hawaiian Kingdom 1854–1874, Twenty Critical Years. Vol. 2. Honolulu: University of Hawaii Press. ISBN 978-0-87022-432-4. OCLC 47010821.
- Kuykendall, Ralph Simpson (1967). The Hawaiian Kingdom 1874–1893, The Kalakaua Dynasty. Vol. 3. Honolulu: University of Hawaii Press. ISBN 978-0-87022-433-1. OCLC 500374815.
- McKinzie, Edith Kawelohea (1983). Stagner, Ishmael W. (ed.). Hawaiian Genealogies: Extracted from Hawaiian Language Newspapers. Vol. 1. Honolulu: University of Hawaii Press. ISBN 0-939154-28-5. OCLC 12555087.
- Osorio, Jon Kamakawiwoʻole (2002). Dismembering Lāhui: A History of the Hawaiian Nation to 1887. Honolulu: University of Hawaii Press. ISBN 0-8248-2549-7. OCLC 48579247.
- Parker, David "Kawika" (2008). "Crypts of the Ali`i The Last Refuge of the Hawaiian Royalty". Tales of Our Hawaiʻi (PDF). Honolulu: Alu Like, Inc. OCLC 309392477. Archived from the original (PDF) on November 11, 2013.
