= Keanolani =

Hawaiian noblewoman (1847–1902)

- Born: July 7, 1847; Kauaʻi
- Died: June 30, 1902 (aged 54); Waikīkī, Honolulu, Oahu
- Burial: July 2, 1902; Kawaiahaʻo Cemetery
- Spouse: Lihilihi; William Hoapili Kaʻauwai (unmarried); Kamali
- Issue: Samuela Kekuiapoiwa; William Hoapili Kaʻauwai II; Lot Kapuāiwa Kamehameha; Keōpūolani Kali; Olga Keahikuni Kekauʻōnohi
- Father: Kamehameha V
- Mother: Abigail Maheha

Keanolani (July 7, 1847 – June 30, 1902) was a Hawaiian chiefess (aliʻi) of the Kingdom of Hawaii. She was the illegitimate daughter of Abigail Maheha and King Kamehameha V, who reigned from 1863 to 1872, and was born during a liaison between the two when they were students at the Chiefs' Children's School (later renamed the Royal School), a boarding school run by American missionaries for students of Hawaiian royal descent. Keanolani was raised by her father's half-sister Keʻelikōlani. Her illegitimate birth and unacknowledged parentage prevented her from succeeding to the Hawaiian throne when her father died without naming an heir, thus ending the reign of the House of Kamehameha. In 1873, she became a mistress of her uncle by marriage William Hoapili Kaʻauwai. In 1874, she became a supporter of the newly elected House of Kalākaua. She married and left descendants. Her name is often abbreviated Keano or Keanu. In one source, she is referred to as Keauoʻokalau.

== Birth and parentage ==
Keanolani was born July 7, 1847, on the island of Kauaʻi. Her birth occurred five months after her mother, fourteen-year-old Abigail Maheha, had an arranged marriage to a commoner named Keaupuni, an expelled student from Lahainaluna Seminary and servant of her hānai (informally adopted) mother, Governess Kekauʻōnohi of Kauaʻi. Through Maheha, Keanolani was the granddaughter of High Chief Namaile and High Chiefess Kuini Liliha, who was the Royal Governor of Oʻahu from 1829 to 1831 and a political adversary of Queen Kaʻahumanu, the Kuhina Nui (premier) during the reigns of Kamehameha II and Kamehameha III. Maheha was a former student at the Chiefs' Children's School, later renamed the Royal School, a boarding school run by American missionaries Amos Starr Cooke and his wife Juliette Montague Cooke for students of Hawaiian royal descent. She was declared eligible for the throne of the Kingdom of Hawaii by King Kamehameha III. However, the fourteen-year-old Maheha had left the school at the insistence of her teachers, and was married off to Keaupuni to cover an unexpected pregnancy. Keaupuni was not the biological father of the baby, as was later attested by Mele, a witness in the 1855 divorce suit between him and Maheha.

Her father was not officially identified. However, during and after her lifetime, speculation has focused on two princes of the Kamehameha dynasty: the seventeen-year-old Moses Kekūāiwa, who was the eldest boy at the Royal School, or his sixteen-year-old brother Lot Kapuāiwa, who later became King Kamehameha V. Evidence points toward Lot because Moses was expelled from the school two days before Maheha. Lot had also financially supported Maheha's husband Keaupuni. The entries from the period after September 1, 1845, were also torn out of Lot's school journal.

== Upbringing and adulthood ==
Keanolani was raised by Princess Ruth Keʻelikōlani, her namesake (one of Keʻelikōlani's secondary name was Keanolani) and the half-sister of Kamehameha V. Kamehameha V reigned from 1863 to his death on December 11, 1872, without acknowledging his daughter or naming an heir to the throne, and was succeeded by his cousin Lunalilo. Keanolani would not have been eligible to succeed Kamehameha V since the Hawaiian constitution only permitted succession through legitimate lines. Similarly, Albert Kūnuiākea, the illegitimate son of Kamehameha III, had not been considered for the throne in 1854.

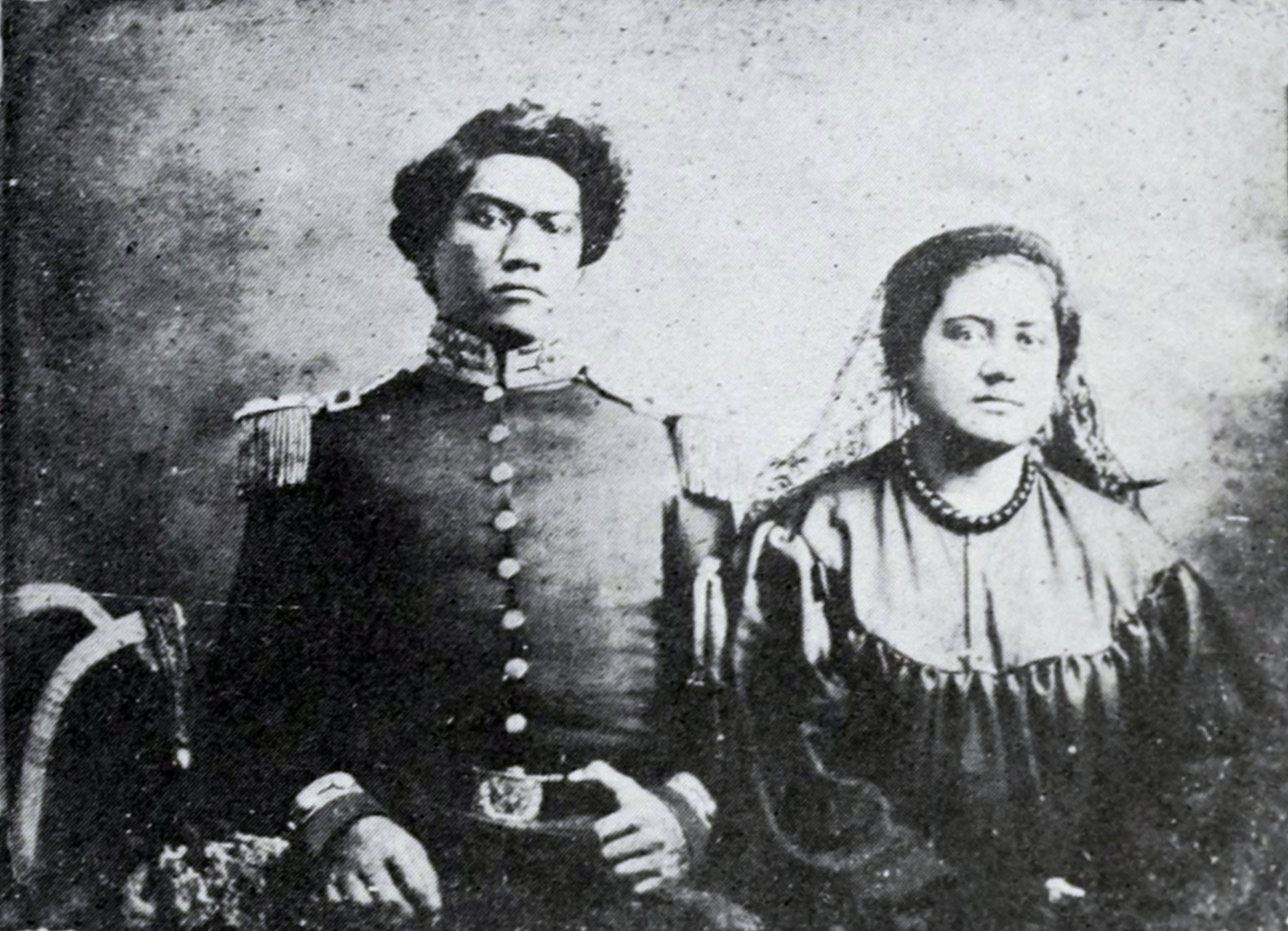
Keaonolani became the mistress of her uncle by marriage William Hoapili Kaʻauwai (left), who was initially married to her half-aunt Kiliwehi (right).

While still married to her first husband Lihilihi, Keanolani became the mistress of William Hoapili Kaʻauwai, an Anglican chaplain and a high chief of Mauian descent who had divorced her half-aunt Kiliwehi in 1872. During this period, Hoapili and Keanolani were partisans of King Kalākaua, elected as monarch in 1874 after the death of King Lunalilo. Hoapili was promised the position of Royal Chamberlain in the new ruling household. Queen Emma, the widow of Kamehameha IV and former patron of Hoapili and Kiliwehi, noted the illicit affair in her letters in 1873. Commenting on September 20, Emma wrote, "Hoapili and Keano are at David’s [Kalākaua's] Hamohamo. It is said she is with child by him again." Later, on September 26, she noted, "Keano was here last evening and appeared to be looking thick round the waist. She reports Kiliwehi recovering under Dr. Hutchison’s treatment...." Keanolani had an illegitimate son which she named William Hoapili Kaʻauwai II, born on January 31, 1874. The elder Hoapili died on March 30, 1874.

Keanolani became a friend of Queen Kapiʻolani, the wife of King Kalākaua. According to the 1898 memoir of Liliʻuokalani, Keano and Princess Victoria Kinoiki Kekaulike carried the train of the robe of Queen Kapiʻolani during the 1883 coronation ceremony. They were both regarded as "ladies of high rank and noble lineages." Few details exist on her life after this point until her death. In later life, she lived on the premises of Pualeilani, the Waikīkī residence of Kapiʻolani. She continued living at Pualeilani when her nephews Princes David Kawānanakoa and Jonah Kūhiō Kalanianaʻole inherited the property. At this point, the Hawaiian monarchy had been overthrown in 1893 and the islands subsequently annexed by the United States in 1898. Despite this, her rank was acknowledged during the birthday reception of the former Queen Liliʻuokalani in 1901. The press initially described her as "old and mentally infirm" but also commented favorably on her noble bearing and knowledge of court etiquette. It was reported that she "swept majestically along amongst the throng as if she were a reigning queen" and "greeted the Queen as one high chieftess [sic] to another."

Keanolani died on June 30, 1902, while bathing at the beaches of Waikīkī near Pualeilani. She died on the beach after a swim in the ocean. The cause of death was reported as apoplexy in her obituaries due to the discoloration of her face, and the coroner ruled that it was due to "fatty degeneration of the heart." She died intestate and her daughter Kahaina petitioned to be appointed administratrix of the estate, which was valued at $2000. After the autopsy, her remains were laid in state at the bungalow of Pualeilani on July 1. The funeral service on the next day was conducted by Reverend Henry Hodges Parker, the pastor of Kawaiahaʻo Church. Her pallbearers included her son Hoapili Kaʻauwai II and her maternal uncle Palekaluhi. Her body was laid to rest at the Kawaiahaʻo Cemetery.

== Marriage and descendants ==
Keanolani had a number of children. Her first husband was Lihilihi, from Kauaʻi, with whom she had a son named Samuela Kekuiapoiwa, who died on June 23, 1903.

While still married to Lihilihi, Keanolani had an illegitimate son William Hoapili Kaʻauwai II, born on January 31, 1874, with her uncle by marriage William Hoapili Kaʻauwai.

She later divorced Lihilihi at the command of her aunt Keʻelikōlani. She married a man named Kamali. Her obituary in 1902 reported, "Several years ago her husband [Kamali] went away into the mountains and nothing more was heard of him." From this marriage, she had three children including Lot Kapuāiwa Kamehameha (1883/1884–1917), who died age 33, Keōpūolani, who married and had descendants with John Kali, and Olga Keahikuni Kekauʻōnohi (1889–1907), who died aged 18.

Another daughter mentioned in the sources was Kahaina, who petitioned to be appointed administratrix of her mother's estate after her death.

== Bibliography ==
- Cooke, Amos Starr; Cooke, Juliette Montague (1937). Richards, Mary Atherton (ed.). The Chiefs' Children School: A Record Compiled from the Diary and Letters of Amos Starr Cooke and Juliette Montague Cooke, by Their Granddaughter Mary Atherton Richards. Honolulu: Honolulu Star-Bulletin. OCLC 1972890.
- Haley, James L. (2014). Captive Paradise: A History of Hawaii. New York: St. Martin's Press. ISBN 978-0-312-60065-5.
- Kaeo, Peter; Queen Emma (1976). Korn, Alfons L. (ed.). News from Molokai, Letters Between Peter Kaeo & Queen Emma, 1873–1876. Honolulu: The University Press of Hawaii. hdl:10125/39980. ISBN 978-0-8248-0399-5. OCLC 2225064.
- Kam, Ralph Thomas (2017). Death Rites and Hawaiian Royalty: Funerary Practices in the Kamehameha and Kalakaua Dynasties, 1819–1953. S. I.: McFarland, Incorporated, Publishers. ISBN 978-1-4766-6846-8. OCLC 966566652.
- Kanahele, George S. (1999). Emma: Hawaii's Remarkable Queen. Honolulu: University of Hawaii Press. ISBN 978-0-8248-2240-8. OCLC 40890919.
- Kaomea, Julie (2014). "Education for Elimination in Nineteenth-Century Hawaiʻi: Settler Colonialism and the Native Hawaiian Chiefs' Children's Boarding School". History of Education Quarterly. 54 (2). New York: History of Education Society: 123–144. doi:10.1111/hoeq.12054. ISSN 0018-2680. OCLC 5571935029. S2CID 143224034.
- Liliuokalani (1898). Hawaii's Story by Hawaii's Queen, Liliuokalani. Boston: Lee and Shepard. ISBN 978-0-548-22265-2. OCLC 2387226.
- McKinzie, Edith Kawelohea (1983). Stagner, Ishmael W. (ed.). Hawaiian Genealogies: Extracted from Hawaiian Language Newspapers. Vol. 1. Honolulu: University of Hawaii Press. ISBN 978-0-939154-28-9. OCLC 12555087.
- Muir, Andrew Forest (1952). "William Hoapili Kaauwai: A Hawaiian in Holy Orders". Sixty-First Annual Report of the Hawaiian Historical Society for the Year 1952. 61. Honolulu: Hawaiian Historical Society: 5–13. hdl:10524/48. OCLC 722778378.
- Van Dyke, Jon M. (2008). Who Owns the Crown Lands of Hawaiʻi?. Honolulu: University of Hawaii Press. ISBN 978-0-8248-6560-3. OCLC 257449971 – via Project MUSE.
- Ahlo, Charles; Johnson, Rubellite; Walker, Jerry (2000). Kamehameha's Children Today. Honolulu: J. Walker. ISBN 978-0-9967803-0-8. OCLC 48872973.
