= Zorobabela Kaʻauwai =

Hawaiian judge (c. 1799/1806–1856)

Assistant Judge of the Supreme Court of Hawaii
- In office May 10, 1842 – November 1846
- Succeeded by: Joshua Kaʻeo

Member of the Board of Commissioners to Quiet Land Titles
- In office February 10, 1846 – March 21, 1850
- Succeeded by: Joshua Kekaulahao

Member of the Kingdom of Hawaii House of Representatives
- In office 1851–1852, 1854–1855

Personal details
- Born: c. 1799/1806 (Note: Sources differ on the year of his birth. American missionary Jonathan Smith Green claimed he was born about 1799 while historian Andrew Forest Muir claims it was about 1806.) Kona, Hawaii, Kingdom of Hawaii
- Died: August 8, 1856 Makawao, Maui
- Spouse: Kalanikauleleiaiwi III
- Children: David Kahalekula Kaʻauwai; William Hoapili Kaʻauwai; George Kaleiwohi Kaʻauwai
- Education: Lahainaluna Seminary
- Occupation: Deacon, Judge, Politician, Businessman

Zorobabela Kaʻauwai (c. 1799/1806 – August 8, 1856) was an early politician and judge in the Kingdom of Hawaii. Beginning as an assistant to the Hoapili, Governor of Maui, he served many political posts including Assistant Judge of the first Supreme Court of Hawaii, an original member of the Board of Commissioners to Quiet Land Titles, a multiple-term representative in the Hawaiian legislature and circuit judge for Maui. An early convert to Christianity and devout adherent of the Protestant faith, his first name is a Hawaiian form of the Biblical name Zerubbabel.

== Early life ==
Kaʻauwai was born around 1799 or 1806, in the district of Kona on the island of Hawaii. Although not of chiefly descent, his family belonged to the "old class of chief's right-hand men." Later historian Jon Kamakawiwoʻole Osorio stated he was a chief, of Maui lineage. At a young age, he attracted the attention of Kamehameha I and later came under the patronage of High Chief Hoapili, one of Kamehameha's advisor and loyal companion and later Governor of Maui. He worked in the household of Hoapili and became his loyal subject. Later writer noted that Kaʻauwai "must have been an extraordinary youth to secure, as he did, the confidence and love of this old chieftain."

Kaʻauwai revered Hoapili as a father figure and accompanied him into battle and fought in the 1824 rebellion of Humehume, on the island of Kauai. He was present when the American missionaries, who arrived in Hawaii in 1820, established a mission station at Lahaina. After the converted Hoapili imposed a law requiring his household retainers to learn the Hawaiian alphabet or otherwise be deprived of food, the obedient Kaʻauwai abstained from food for two entire days and he learned to read and write. He and his friend David Malo became interested in Christianity at the same time and both served as early helpers to the missionaries in Lahaina, although unlike Malo, he was never licensed to preach. Under the order of Hoapili, he helped build the stone church of Kalaniʻohua, on Maui. With Malo, he attended the Lahainaluna became one of the first generation of Hawaiians to receive a western education by the American missionaries who arrived in Hawaii in 1820. Reginald Yzendoorn, author of History of the Catholic Mission in the Hawaiian Islands, later wrote that Kaʻauwai was a judge and Calvinist deacon who related the burning of the Roman Catholic chapel of Wailuku in 1843 to his mother-in-law Marie Leahi, an early Catholic female catechumen. In the early Hawaiian Protestant mission, deacons did not have to be licensed to preach.

Kaʻauwai became an experienced fisherman, manager of the chief's canoes and an early physician. He worked as his headman or right-hand agent to Governor Hoapili and was effectively the Lieutenant Governor of Maui in all but name. In their first meeting in 1832, Reverend Richard Armstrong described how Hoapili trusted him with all his important business including accessing and collecting taxes, managing his property, and conducting tours of the island of Maui, and thus became a highly respected and well-loved official in the public view. In October 1851, the Privy Council of State, the advisory council for the king, recommended him as a candidate for the Governorship of Maui left vacant by the death of James Kānehoa Young, but the council eventually voted eight to three to recommended the appointment of Prince Lot Kapuāiwa (the future Kamehameha V) instead. However, Prince Lot never seem to have taken up this position either because Kānehoa's deputy Paul Nahaolelua remained acting governor until his own appointment in 1852.

== Political career ==
In 1842, Kaʻauwai was elected by the Hawaiian legislature to serve as one of the four Assistant Judges of the Supreme Court of Hawaii, the first formed in the Kingdom of Hawaii between 1842 and 1848, which was headed by King Kamehameha III and the Kuhina Nui Kekāuluohi and after her death Keoni Ana. These four judges of the Supreme Court were not Associate Justices (like later individuals appointed after 1848) but served in the capacity of an assistant to the Chief Justice, i.e., the King. He sat as a judge from 1842 to 1846, before resigning in November, 1846. He was succeeded by Joshua Kaʻeo. In 1842, King Kamehameha III also appointed Kaʻauwai as one of the five original members of the Board of Commissioners to Quiet Land Titles, a government committee in charge of settling or quieting land claims of the Great Māhele. He served in this post from February 10, 1846 until his resignation on March 21, 1850; an experienced attorney Joshua Kekaulahao was appointed in his place after he resigned.

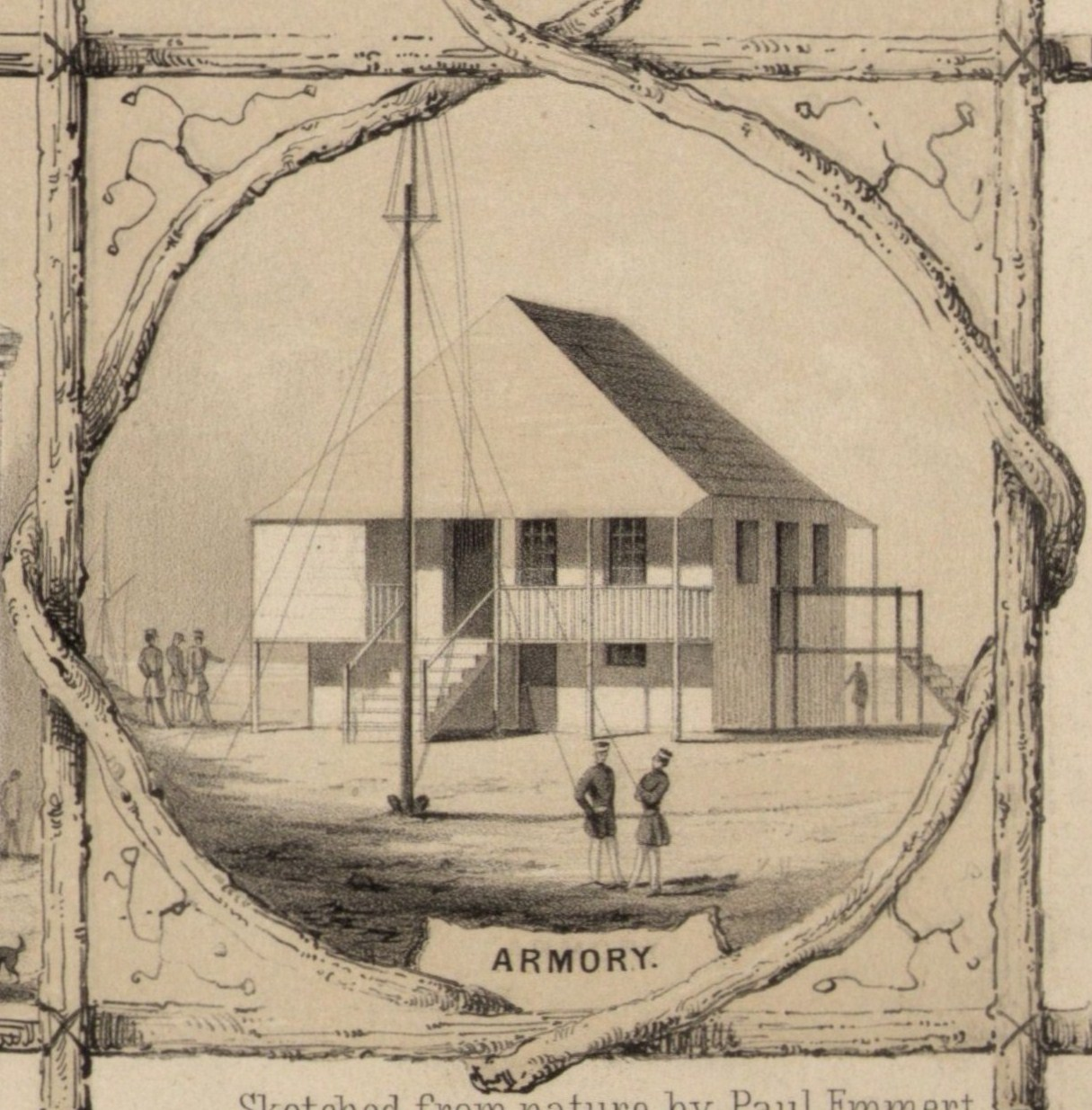
Mauna Kilika, an early government building and meeting place for the Legislature of Hawaii from 1845 to 1852

According to historian Samuel Kamakau and contemporary legislative records, Kaʻauwai was one of the early "representatives of the people" who assembled with the king and the chiefs in the first session of the legislature of the Hawaiian Kingdom which met between April and May 1841, at Luaʻehu, in the early capital of Lahaina. Instead of a direct vote, these early representatives were appointed by recommendation or petitions from the people of the four main islands to the king. In 1842, Kamakau replaced him as one of the two representative for Maui in the next session. Records and legislative roster from the monarchy do not list him as a representative of the other sessions of the 1840s. After the expansion of representation in the 1850s and the introduction of direct suffrage in 1851, he was elected as a member of the House of Representatives, the lower house of the legislature, and sat for four terms in the legislative assemblies of 1851, 1852, 1854 and 1855. No records exist for his representation in 1851, but he represented the district of Makawao, Maui in 1852, for Hamakua, Maui in 1854, and for Honolulu, Oahu in 1855. Writing after his death, Reverend Jonathan Smith Green noted, "As a member of this body, I had the testimony of Judge Lee, often repeated, that no Hawaiian member equalled him for solid worth. Mr. Lee was Speaker once or twice when Kaauwai was a member, and knew him well. Had he lived, he would doubtless have continued to serve his generation by the will of God." He served as a magistrate for Makawao. He was also a judge of the Circuit Court of Maui from April 27, 1855 until his death on August 8, 1856.

Aside from politics, Kaʻauwai was a successful entrepreneur and was regarded as a "man of wealth". He acquired and accumulated extensive property in Honolulu and Maui, and according to Reverend Armstrong, who was pastor at Kawaiahaʻo Church and knew him in later life, stated "He did accumulate property; he had lands, houses, cattle, and money. But he did not hoard these fruits of his industry—he gave freely to aid in every good work; gave for the support of the Gospel; aided in building meeting houses and school houses; in sending the Gospel to the heathen, and in assisting the needy." In March 1849, he attempted to purchase the island of Kahoʻolawe from the King and the Land Commission. Kaʻauwai offered $400 for the entire island, which had been previously used unsuccessfully as a male penal colony. The offer was refused by the King and his Privy Council of State, and a subsequent application dated to August 18, 1854 for a fifty-year lease at $200 per year was also declined. He also worked as a farmer and acquired property on Maui for growing taro and banana, which he won prizes for at the Hawaiian Agricultural Society in 1851.

In later life, he became a resident of Wailuku and Makawao and was a donor and attendant of the church at Makawao, founded by Reverend Green, after developing a rift with the Wailuku Congregational Church. Falling ill while he was in Honolulu, Kaʻauwai returned to his native Maui for a change of climate which did nothing to improve his health. He died at Makawao, on August 8, 1856. In a letter dated to October 6, 1856, Reverend Jonathan Smith Green, who had befriended him during his lifetime as a parishioner of the Makawao church, wrote a short biography of Kaʻauwai which was published in The American Missionary.

== Family and children ==
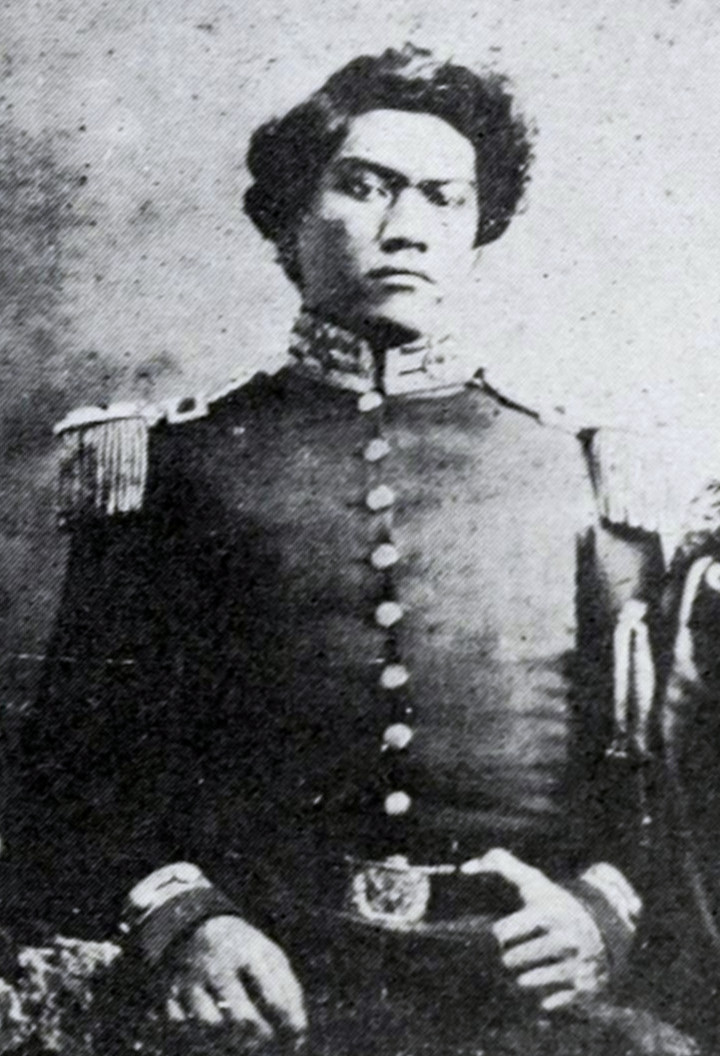
His son William Hoapili Kaʻauwai

Kaʻauwai married Kalanikauleleiaiwi III, a high chiefess of the Maui lineage descended from Piʻilani, and a relative of the family of High Chief Hoapili. His mother-in-law Marie Leahi was an early Roman Catholic female catechumen. With Kalanikauleleiaiwi he had four children: three sons including David Kahalekula Kaʻauwai (1833–1856), William Hoapili Kaʻauwai (1835–1874), and George Kaleiwohi Kaʻauwai (1843–1883) and a daughter who died in infancy before 1848. His eldest son David Kahalekula Kaʻauwai served alongside his father in the House of Representatives, from 1854 to 1855, and was considered "one of the finest Hawaiian orators". His second son William Hoapili Kaʻauwai also served in the legislator as a Representative for Wailuku for two terms in 1862 and 1870. He became the only ordained Hawaiian Anglican priest and traveled with his wife Kiliwehi as part of the retinue of Queen Emma during her trip to Europe. His youngest son George Kaleiwohi Kaʻauwai married Ulalia Muolo Keaweheulu Laʻanui, and their daughter was Princess Elizabeth Kahanu Kalanianaʻole, wife of Prince Jonah Kūhiō Kalanianaʻole, the second Congressional Delegate from the Territory of Hawaii.

== Bibliography ==
- Frear, Walter F. (1894). "Evolution of the Hawaiian Judiciary". Papers of the Hawaiian Historical Society (7). Honolulu: Hawaiian Historical Society: 1–25. hdl:10524/966.
- Green, J. S. (1857). "Letter from Rev. J. S. Green, Makawao Maui, October 6, 1856". The American Missionary. Vol. I. New York: American Missionary Association. pp. 26–30. OCLC 42342811.
- Hawaii (1918). Lydecker, Robert Colfax (ed.). Roster Legislatures of Hawaii, 1841–1918. Honolulu: Hawaiian Gazette Company. OCLC 60737418.
- Judd, Albert Francis (1888). Thrum, Thomas G. (ed.). "Early Constitution of the Judiciary of the Hawaiian Islands, Maile Wreath, February 1875, reprinted in". Hawaiian Almanac and Annual for 1889. Honolulu: Honolulu Star-Bulletin: 63–67. hdl:10524/655. OCLC 1663720.
- Judd, C. S. (1916). Thrum, Thomas G. (ed.). Kahoolawe. Honolulu: Honolulu Star-Bulletin.
- Kaeo, Peter; Queen Emma (1976). Korn, Alfons L. (ed.). News from Molokai, Letters Between Peter Kaeo & Queen Emma, 1873–1876. Honolulu: The University Press of Hawaii. hdl:10125/39980. ISBN 978-0-8248-0399-5. OCLC 2225064.
- Kamakau, Samuel (1992) [1961]. Ruling Chiefs of Hawaii (Revised ed.). Honolulu: Kamehameha Schools Press. ISBN 0-87336-014-1. OCLC 25008795.
- Kameʻeleihiwa, Lilikalā (1992). Native Land and Foreign Desires. Honolulu: Bishop Museum Press. ISBN 0-930897-59-5. OCLC 154146650.
- Kuykendall, Ralph Simpson (1965) [1938]. The Hawaiian Kingdom 1778–1854, Foundation and Transformation. Vol. 1. Honolulu: University of Hawaii Press. ISBN 0-87022-431-X. OCLC 47008868.
- Lange, Raeburn (2006). Island Ministers: Indigenous Leadership in Nineteenth Century Pacific Islands Christianity (PDF). Christchurch, New Zealand: Macmillan Brown Centre for Pacific Studies, University of Canterbury. ISBN 978-1-74076-176-5. Archived from the original (PDF) on February 23, 2017.
- MacDonald, Peter (1972). "Fixed in Time: A Brief History of Kahoolawe". The Hawaiian Journal of History. 6. Honolulu: Hawaiian Historical Society: 69–90. hdl:10524/446. OCLC 60626541.
- McKinzie, Edith Kawelohea (1983). Stagner, Ishmael W. (ed.). Hawaiian Genealogies: Extracted from Hawaiian Language Newspapers. Vol. 1. Honolulu: University of Hawaii Press. ISBN 0-939154-28-5. OCLC 12555087.
- Moffat, Riley Moore; Fitzpatrick, Gary L. (1995). Surveying the Mahele: Mapping the Hawaiian Land Revolution. Honolulu: Editions Limited. ISBN 978-0-915013-17-3. OCLC 33045472.
- Muir, Andrew Forest (1952). "William Hoapili Kaauwai: A Hawaiian in Holy Orders". Sixty-First Annual Report of the Hawaiian Historical Society for the Year 1952. 61. Honolulu: Hawaiian Historical Society: 5–13. hdl:10524/48. OCLC 722778378.
- Osorio, Jon Kamakawiwoʻole (2002). Dismembering Lāhui: A History of the Hawaiian Nation to 1887. Honolulu: University of Hawaii Press. ISBN 0-8248-2549-7. OCLC 48579247.
- Parke, William Cooper (1891). Personal Reminiscences of William Cooper Parke: Marshal of the Hawaiian Islands, From 1850 to 1884: Rewritten and Arranged by His Son, William C. Parke. Cambridge, MA: University Press. OCLC 907685107.
- Peterson, Barbara Bennett (1984). Notable Women of Hawaii. Honolulu: University of Hawaii Press. ISBN 978-0-8248-0820-4. OCLC 11030010.
- Spaulding, Thomas Marshall (1930). "Early Years of the Hawaiian Legislature". Thirty-Eighth Annual Report of the Hawaiian Historical Society for the Year 1929. Honolulu: Hawaiian Historical Society: 25–33. hdl:10524/33. OCLC 2105039.
- Van Dyke, Jon M. (2008). Who Owns the Crown Lands of Hawaiʻi?. Honolulu: University of Hawaii Press. ISBN 978-0-8248-6560-3. OCLC 257449971 – via Project MUSE.
- Yzendoorn, Reginald (1927). History of the Catholic Mission in the Hawaiian Islands. Honolulu: Honolulu Star-Bulletin. OCLC 5524024.
