= Kiliwehi =

Hawaiian noblewoman (c. 1840–1873)

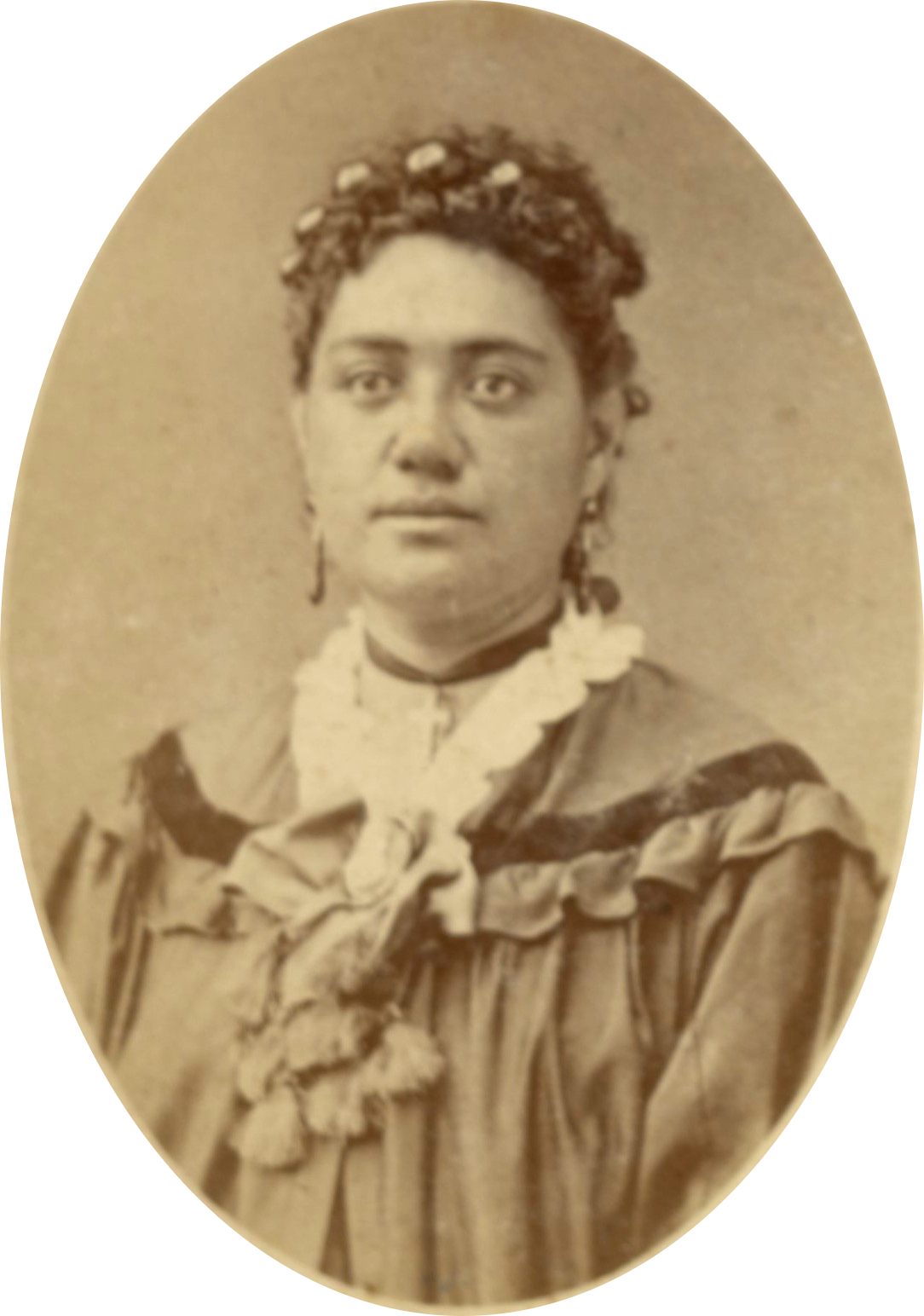
- Born: c. 1840
- Died: November 4, 1873; Haleʻākala, Honolulu, Oahu
- Spouse: William Hoapili Kaʻauwai
- Father: Haʻalou
- Mother: Kuini Liliha

Mary Ann Kiliwehi Kaʻauwai (c. 1840 – November 4, 1873) was a Hawaiian high chiefess and lady-in-waiting of the Kingdom of Hawaii. Alongside her husband William Hoapili Kaʻauwai, she traveled with Queen Emma of Hawaii to Europe between 1865 and 1866, and circumnavigated the globe upon their return eastward via New Zealand.

== Early life ==
Kiliwehi was born c. 1840, as the daughter of Kuini Liliha, an influential high chiefess and Governor of Oahu, and Haʻalou (different from the chief executed for adultery with one of Kamehameha II's wives in 1822). Her mother was a descendant of the ancient kings of Hawaii and Maui. Kiliwehi was also the name of an early Hawaiian high chiefess who was the daughter of King Kamehameha I and Peleuli, the wife of Prime Minister Kalanimoku and the mother of Leleiohoku I.

She had many half-siblings including sisters: Jane Loeau (1828–1873), Abigail Maheha (1832–1861), and Kailinoa, and brothers: Pius F. Koakanu (died 1880) and Aberahama Kaikioewa Palekaluhi (1830–1912). Most of her siblings were given away in hānai to other family members and friends. The Hawaiian custom of hānai is an informal form of adoption between extended families practiced by Hawaiian royals and commoners alike. Kiliwehi and her sister Abigail Maheha were adopted under the Hawaiian tradition of hānai by the Princess Kekauʻōnohi, a granddaughter of Kamehameha I who served as Governor of Kauai.

She attended the Royal School in Honolulu, which was run by American Protestant missionaries Reverend Edward G. Beckwith. Her classmates included the future monarchs Kalākaua and Liliuokalani, and Princess Victoria Kamāmalu. These royal classmates and her two elder sisters had attended the previous institution of the same name, a boarding school ran by Amos Starr Cooke and Juliette Montague Cooke, and had been declared by King Kamehameha III as eligible for the Hawaiian throne.

== Marriage and travel abroad ==
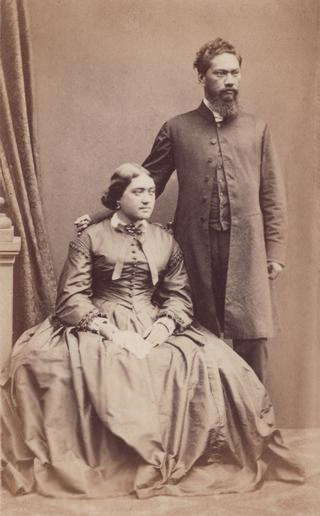
William Hoapili Kaʻauwai and Kiliwehi, in London, 1865

Kiliwehi married William Hoapili Kaʻauwai (1835–1874), a Maui high chief, politician and the only ordained Native Hawaiian priest of the Anglican Church of Hawaii. They had no children. She and her husband became associated with King Kamehameha IV and his wife Queen Emma. They became early converts to the Anglican faith.

After Kamehameha IV's death, Queen Emma decided to travel to England to solicit donations for erecting a cathedral in Honolulu and to continue the legacy of her husband. She chose Kiliwehi as her lady-in-waiting and her husband Kaʻauwai to be her chaplain to accompany her on this trip from 1865 to 1866. They traveled with the queen through Panama, England, Italy, and the French Rivera. She was presented to Queen Victoria during Queen Emma's audience with the British monarch on September 9, 1865, and her overnight stay at Windsor Castle on November 27, 1865. In her private journal, Victoria mentioned Kiliwehi as "Mrs. Hoopile", writing that Queen Emma "presented her lady, whose husband is her Chaplain, both being Hawaiians".

Queen Emma's travel to Europe and the United States (1865–1866)

The extended royal trip continued onto the European continent through France and Italy. At Florence, her husband requested to return home and continue his clerical duties in Hawaii. Later at Turin, Kiliwehi was also permitted to accompany him back. They returned to London and took an extended route back to Hawaii, stopping off in Auckland, New Zealand without the knowledge or permission of Queen Emma or King Kamehameha V. Prior to leaving England, Kaʻauwai had written to the Hawaiian Minister of Finance Charles Coffin Harris indicating they intended to take a "rather long round-about, and slow way toward home". Unknown to the Hawaiian government, the couple went to New Zealand to recruit Māori immigrants to settle in the Kingdom of Hawaii. This unauthorized excursion displeased the Hawaiian government and they were asked to return home.

By the time the Kaʻauwais returned to Hawaii in 1867, Queen Emma had already returned as well. Back in Honolulu, her husband was shunned by King Kamehameha V because of his treatment of Queen Emma and the unauthorized visit to New Zealand. Domestic relations between Kiliwehi and her husband worsened. According to Kamehameha V, in one incident, Kaʻauwai placed a gun to her head and offered to shoot her. After this abuse, she left her husband and went to live at Haleʻākala, with High Chiefess Bernice Pauahi Bishop. Kiliwehi filed for divorce on April 22, 1872; the case went to trial on September 12 and she was granted a temporary decree which was made absolute on June 18, 1873. She was awarded ten dollars a month in alimony and Kaʻauwai was asked to cover the costs of the divorce suit. Her husband later had an illegitimate son William Hoapili Kaʻauwai II, whose mother is either mentioned as Keanolani or Keauookalau, the wife of Lihilihi, of Kauai.

== Illness and death ==
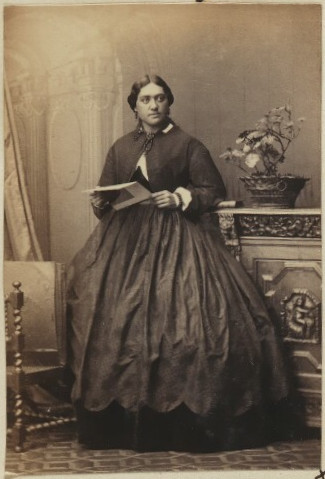
Kiliwehi, photograph by Camille Silvy, 1865

Kiliwehi developed pulmonary tuberculosis, a serious disease among the Native Hawaiians which her husband also had. On October 11, 1873, she was sent from her home at Wailuku via Kahului on the inter-island schooner Ka Moi to Honolulu for further treatment. Her half-brother Koakanu and his mistress tried to help her with "the last remedies and comforts that could be obtained". However, Kiliwehi decided to consult with Irish physician Robert McKibbin and asked to be admitted to the Queen's Hospital. McKibbin asked if there were any friends or relative that she could quarter with instead. Kiliwehi initially could not think of anyone but later considered Miriam Likelike Cleghorn (sister of Liliuokalani) and asked McKibbin if he would make the recommendation for her to stay with the Cleghorns. However, McKibbin declined to make the request since he believed it was a matter that she personally had to do. She was given the most comfortable room in the upstair women's wing of the hospital with a view of Diamond Head. Her friend Queen Emma wrote, "Poor Kiliwehi is at the Hospital and bleeding dreadfully at her lungs." Emma also noted that Kalākaua was at the harbor when Kiliwehi landed and noticed "blood was freely runing [sic] from her nose". Her condition worsened and she was moved from her hospital room to Haleʻākala, the home of Bernice Pauahi Bishop. Kiliwehi eventually died, on November 3, 1873, at Haleʻākala, Honolulu. She was 33 years old at the time of her death. Her funeral presided by Bishop Alfred Willis was held the following day at the St. Andrew's Pro-Cathedral.

== Bibliography ==
- Biographical Sketch of His Majesty King Kalakaua. Honolulu: P. C. Advertiser Steam Printing Office. 1884. pp. 72–74. OCLC 12787107.
- Cooke, Amos Starr; Cooke, Juliette Montague (1937). Richards, Mary Atherton (ed.). The Chiefs' Children School: A Record Compiled from the Diary and Letters of Amos Starr Cooke and Juliette Montague Cooke, by Their Granddaughter Mary Atherton Richards. Honolulu: Honolulu Star-Bulletin. OCLC 1972890.
- Cracroft, Sophia; Franklin, Jane; Queen Emma (1958). Korn, Alfons L. (ed.). The Victorian Visitors: An Account of the Hawaiian Kingdom, 1861–1866, Including the Journal Letters of Sophia Cracroft: Extracts from the Journals of Lady Franklin, and Diaries and Letters of Queen Emma of Hawaii. Honolulu: University of Hawaii Press. hdl:10125/39981. ISBN 978-0-87022-421-8. OCLC 8989368.
- Hackler, Rhoda E. A. (1988). ""My Dear Friend": Letters of Queen Victoria and Queen Emma". The Hawaiian Journal of History. 22. Honolulu: Hawaiian Historical Society: 101–130. hdl:10524/220. OCLC 60626541.
- Jarves, James Jackson (1872). History of the Hawaiian Islands. Honolulu: H. M. Whitney. OCLC 1611016.
- Kameʻeleihiwa, Lilikalā (1992). Native Land and Foreign Desires. Honolulu: Bishop Museum Press. ISBN 0-930897-59-5. OCLC 154146650.
- Kaeo, Peter; Queen Emma (1976). Korn, Alfons L. (ed.). News from Molokai, Letters Between Peter Kaeo & Queen Emma, 1873–1876. Honolulu: The University Press of Hawaii. hdl:10125/39980. ISBN 978-0-8248-0399-5. OCLC 2225064.
- Kanahele, George S. (1999). Emma: Hawaii's Remarkable Queen. Honolulu: University of Hawaii Press. ISBN 978-0-8248-2240-8. OCLC 40890919.
- McKinzie, Edith Kawelohea (1983). Stagner, Ishmael W. (ed.). Hawaiian Genealogies: Extracted from Hawaiian Language Newspapers. Vol. 1. Honolulu: University of Hawaii Press. ISBN 0-939154-28-5. OCLC 12555087.
- Muir, Andrew Forest (1952). "William Hoapili Kaauwai: A Hawaiian in Holy Orders". Sixty-First Annual Report of the Hawaiian Historical Society for the Year 1952. 61. Honolulu: Hawaiian Historical Society: 5–13. hdl:10524/48. OCLC 722778378.
