= David Kahalekula Kaʻauwai =

Hawaiian lawyer and politician (c. 1833–1856)

Member of the Kingdom of Hawaii House of Representatives for the district of Kāʻanapali, Maui
- In office April 8, 1854 – August 12, 1855
- Monarchs: Kamehameha III; Kamehameha IV

Personal details
- Born: c. 1833
- Died: January 26, 1856 Honolulu, Oʻahu
- Spouse: Jane B. Humphryes

David Kahalekula Kaʻauwai (c. 1833 – January 26, 1856) was a lawyer and politician of the Kingdom of Hawaii. He served two terms as a member of the House of Representatives of the Legislature of the Kingdom from 1854 to 1855. His father and younger brother were also legislators while his niece became a Princess of Hawaii.

== Life ==
Kaʻauwai was born c. 1833, as the eldest son of Zorobabela Kaʻauwai and Kalanikauleleiaiwi III. His father was a successful Hawaiian politician, judge and entrepreneur who owed his rise to prominence to High Chief Hoapili, a trusted friend and companion of King Kamehameha I and the Governor of Maui. Through his mother, he descended from the ancient Hawaiian Mōʻī of Maui, Piʻilani. His mother was also a relative of Governor Hoapili. He had three siblings: William Hoapili Kaʻauwai (1835 – 74), George Kaleiwohi Kaʻauwai (1843 – 83) and a sister who died in infancy before 1848. His niece became Princess Elizabeth Kahanu Kalanianaʻole, wife of Prince Jonah Kūhiō Kalanianaʻole, the second Congressional Delegate from the Territory of Hawaii.

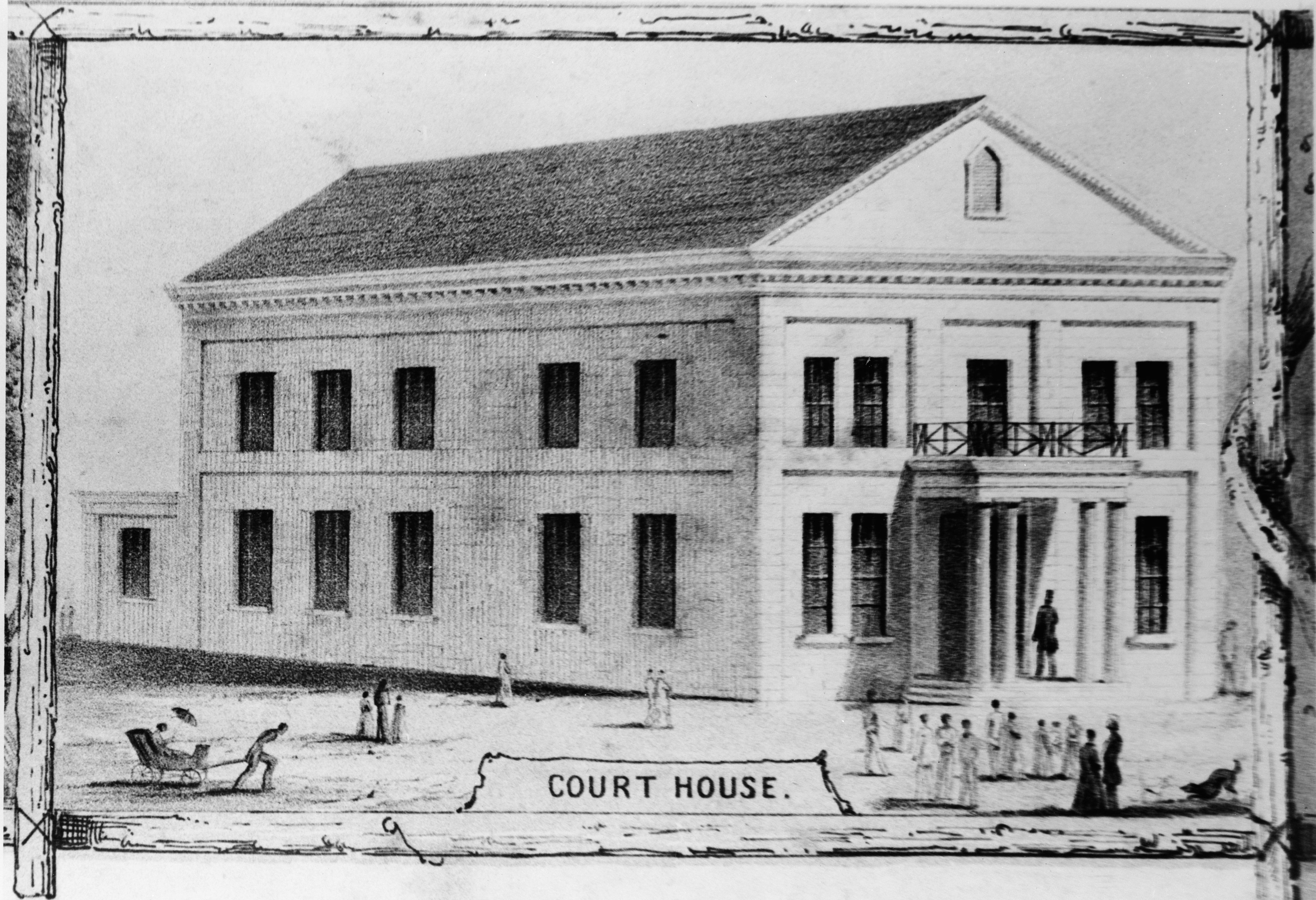
The Old Courthouse used for the sessions of the Legislature of Hawaii from 1852 to 1874

In January 1854, Kaʻauwai was elected as a member of the House of Representatives, the lower house of the Hawaiian legislature, for the district of Kāʻanapali on the eastern edge of the island of Maui. He was re-elected to serve a second term for the same district during the regular election of January 1854. He sat in on the legislative assembly during the regular session of 1854 (from April 8 to August 12), the regular session of 1855 (from April 7 to June 1855), and the extraordinary session of 1855 (July 30 to August 12), which was called to passed the Appropriation Bill and other unfinished business from the previous session. Except for the extra session of 1855, he served alongside his father Zorobabela who was a representative for Hamakua, Maui and later Honolulu.

Kaʻauwai married Jane B. Humphryes, on January 23, 1854, at Wailuku, Maui. They had no children. From 1854 to 1855, he was also an annual member of the Royal Hawaiian Agricultural Society. He was also a member of the Hawaiian bar. Kaʻauwai predeceased his father and died in Honolulu, on January 26, 1856. Later Hawaiian newspapers, reporting the election of his younger brother William Hoapili Kaʻauwai as the representative of Wailuku in 1862, noted that he was "one of the finest Hawaiian orators" and that William possessed "some of the characteristics of his brother, but has never been in public life, or had the opportunity for rhetorical display" unlike David.

He was mentioned in a letter dated to June 29, 1874, written by Peter Kaʻeo to his cousin Queen Emma, a patron of his younger brother. While residing at the Kalaupapa Leper Settlement, Kaʻeo wrote how a fellow leprosy patient, Kitty Keliʻikuaʻāina Napela, wife of Jonatana Napela, had dreamed of Kahalekula (i.e. David), William and their mother sitting by her bedside dressed in white robes. He also mentioned that this was the third time Napela had dreamt this dream which she had described as kuluma (customary) since David's death. Both brothers and their mother had also died by the time of this third dream.

== Bibliography ==
- Hawaii (1918). Lydecker, Robert Colfax (ed.). Roster Legislatures of Hawaii, 1841–1918. Honolulu: Hawaiian Gazette Company. OCLC 60737418.
- Kaeo, Peter; Queen Emma (1976). Korn, Alfons L. (ed.). News from Molokai, Letters Between Peter Kaeo & Queen Emma, 1873–1876. Honolulu: The University Press of Hawaii. hdl:10125/39980. ISBN 978-0-8248-0399-5. OCLC 2225064.
- McKinzie, Edith Kawelohea (1983). Stagner, Ishmael W. (ed.). Hawaiian Genealogies: Extracted from Hawaiian Language Newspapers. Vol. 1. Honolulu: University of Hawaii Press. ISBN 0-939154-28-5. OCLC 12555087.
- Muir, Andrew Forest (1952). "William Hoapili Kaauwai: A Hawaiian in Holy Orders". Sixty-First Annual Report of the Hawaiian Historical Society for the Year 1952. 61. Honolulu: Hawaiian Historical Society: 5–13. hdl:10524/48. OCLC 722778378.
- Osorio, Jon Kamakawiwoʻole (2002). Dismembering Lāhui: A History of the Hawaiian Nation to 1887. Honolulu: University of Hawaii Press. ISBN 0-8248-2549-7. OCLC 48579247.
- Peterson, Barbara Bennett (1984). Notable Women of Hawaii. Honolulu: University of Hawaii Press. ISBN 978-0-8248-0820-4. OCLC 11030010.
