= Jane Loeau =

Hawaiian chiefess (1828–1873)

- Born: December 5, 1828; Waimea, Kauai County, Hawaii
- Died: July 30, 1873 (aged 44); Puunui, Honolulu, Hawaii
- Spouse: John Robert Jasper (m. 1847; div. ?); Marvin Seger (m. 1855; div. ?); S. L. Kaelemakule (m. 1862)
- Issue: Paki-liilii Kaelemakule
- House: Kekaulike
- Father: Kalaniulumoku
- Mother: Kuini Liliha

Jane Loeau (December 5, 1828 – July 30, 1873) was a Hawaiian chiefess during the Kingdom of Hawaii who attended the Chiefs' Children's School, also known as the Royal School.

== Early life and education ==
She was born December 5, 1828, at Waimea, Kauai, the daughter of High Chief Kalaniulumoku and High Chiefess Kuini Liliha. Her mother was the royal governor of Oahu and was politically powerful during the regency of Kaahumanu. She was descended from Kahekili II, Moi of Maui, and High Chief Hoapili through her mother. She had a half-sister Abigail Maheha. She was adopted or hānaied by Ahukai (1792–1855), also known as Ka‘u‘ukuali‘i or Kaukuali‘i or Ukuali‘i, wife of Daniel Oleloa. Ahukai, was the daughter of Manono Kauakapakulani and Kailinaoa, a sister of Kaumualiʻi, the last independent king of Kauaʻi.

At a young age, she was placed in the Chiefs' Children's School, also known as the Royal School, a select school for the royal children of the highest rank who were eligible to be rulers. Along with her other classmates, she was chosen by Kamehameha III to be eligible for the throne of the Kingdom of Hawaii. She was one of the first to attend Chiefs' Children's School. Her classmates included her half-sister Abigail Maheha and fourteen other royal cousins. Out of the sixteen children of the school five would rule as monarchs of the kingdom.

They were taught by Amos Starr Cooke and his wife, Juliette Montague Cooke, to eat, dress, and speak like European or American children. In the classroom students were divided by their age and length of time at the school. At the age of eleven, she was the eldest girl and student at the school and a member of the senior level class. On Sundays it was customary for boys and girls to walk side by side to church; Jane walked beside Moses Kekūāiwa, the eldest boy at the school and brother of Alexander Liholiho and Lot Kapuaiwa. They were betrothed to one another.

In her school days, she was a close friend of Bernice Pauahi, who was the only girl at the school around her age. She and Bernice often played on the piano, teaching the younger girls how to sing and play the piano. Among them was Lydia Kamakaeha, who would be Hawaii's last queen and a great composer.

American merchant Gorham D. Gilman visited the Royal School in 1848, after both Jane and Abigail had left the school. He commented on the two sisters' education, declining family rank and inability to support themselves:

The two female pupils who have left were two sisters—who had been educated at the school and remained in it until they were married. These two are of an ancient family wh[ich] was formerly of rank and importance among the other high families—but adversity and losses have taken from them the most of their lands and influence—they however are acknowledged by the Court as of rank but have not the means of supporting it. The two misses were pleasant agreeable young ladies—of good capability—and who made considerable advances in their studies particularly the elder wh[o] was a Compan[ion] of Miss B.s [Bernice Pauahi] and who like her played & sang as well and painted and drew very prettily—and gave evidence that their teachers had not been remiss in the discharge of their duties to them but [had] done all they could to fit them for life.

== Marriage ==
Loeau was known for her good looks and lively ways. In February 1847, Cooke wrote that Kanaʻina, the father of her classmate Lunalilo, "offered himself to Jane," and Jane replied that she needed time to consider it. Loeau had originally been intended for Moses Kekūāiwa, the eldest of the Kamehameha brothers, but after his expulsion from the school, he showed no further interest in her.

Later that year, Loeau became acquainted with John Robert Jasper, a young American attorney who practiced law and served as a notary public in the islands. Jasper had arrived in Hawaii after leaving a whaling ship around 1845 and had previously served as an officer in the United States Army in Florida. Contemporary accounts differ on his origins: Cooke described him as being from Virginia, while Robert Crichton Wyllie identified him as a native of Baltimore. He was well regarded at the time; Cooke credited him with a reputation for "temperance, intelligence and morality", John Ricord reportedly held a "very high opinion" of his talents and character, and Wyllie described him as a "high-spirited, honourable Man".

On June 28, Cooke recorded being "much pleased" with Jasper's company. On July 20, Jasper took tea with the Cookes for the first time and soon afterward proposed himself to Loeau, who initially hesitated. On July 23, Jasper wrote to Amos Cooke of his attachment to Loeau and requested permission from the Cookes to court her, stating that he believed their feelings were mutual. On July 26, Jasper's proposal was discussed by the Privy Council. Wyllie spoke favorably of Jasper's character. The chiefs were divided over the match: John Papa ʻĪʻī, Abner Pākī, Kapaʻakea, and Keoni Ana supported it, while Kaeo, Kanaʻina, and Namakeha opposed it. The king stated that "if the two persons were agreed", the question of marriage should be left to Loeau's natural guardians. The final decision was entrusted to William Richards and Kekauʻōnohi. Cooke subsequently recorded that Richards and Kekauʻōnohi approved "the desire of Mr. Jasper & Jane".

Loeau and Jasper married on September 2, 1847, when she was eighteen. The wedding was held at the school before approximately seventy-five guests, including King Kamehameha III, Queen Kalama, chiefs, chiefesses, ministers of state, members of the Privy Council, and other dignitaries. After the ceremony, Loeau and her bridesmaids played the piano, and the Cookes accompanied the newlyweds to the gate of their new residence. Cooke later stated that the Cookes believed Jasper would appreciate Loeau's education and make her happy.

Her marriage to Jasper was not a happy one as noted later on by her school teacher Mrs. Cooke in her diary:

Jane's marriage with Mr. Jasper turns out to be a sad affair. He is, and has been, very intemperate and she has not been any better for it, and now he has forbidden any one trusting her on his account. The probability is that they will be divorced....

Their marriage was one of greatest scandals in Honolulu in those days and a continental source of gossip. As Mrs. Cooke predicted, their marriage eventually ended in divorce, and Jasper died on April 29, 1851.

Writing in 1854, United States Commissioner to the Hawaiian Kingdom David L. Gregg painted a negative picture of Loeau and her marriage to Jasper which contrasted with Cooke's account:

Yesterday I met at Kalihi a woman named Jane Jasper, the widow of an American Lawyer, who filled the offices of Register of Conveyances here. She was educated at the Royal School, speaks English perfectly and is sprightly and well informed. In her Younger days she was regarded as the most promising of all the half-whites. After her marriage with Jasper, she fell into habits of licentiousness, contracted disease, communicated it to her husband, of which he died miserably, but succeeded in getting cured herself. She is now a prostitute, steeped in vice, but sprightly intelligent, and able to converse not only with propriety but elegance. It was sad to think, when listening to her, that she was entirely lost to decency and virtue.

Loeau married for the second time to Marvin Seger on March 15, 1855. Seger was a Honolulu businessman with a shop on Maunakea Street. This second union also ended in divorce and Loeau petitioned to be able to remarry. She remarried on December 6, 1862, to S. L. Kaelemakule in a ceremony officiated by Reverend Artemas Bishop in Honolulu. Loeau had a son named Paki-liilii Kaelemakule with her third husband.

== Later life and death ==
She later moved to Lahaina, but returned to Honolulu where she lived out the rest of her life in relative obscurity. Loeau died on July 30, 1873, at Puunui, Honolulu. While still considered strong of body, she had been feeling chest pains after bathing and the condition resulted in her early death. Her body was laid to rest in the cemetery at Kawaiahaʻo Church. In a letter to her cousin Peter Kaʻeo, Queen Emma complained about the tastelessness and the lack of respect Loeau, their former classmate, was given in her obituary written by Ka Nūhou, which was only a brief account of her genealogy. The Hawaiian press was much more sympathetic. On August 6, 1873, her husband S. L. Kaelemakule wrote an article along with a mele kanaenae (traditional Hawaiian chant) in the newspaper Ko Hawaii Ponoi in honor of her. In it he described her and their marriage:

We were together for 10 years, 7 months, and 25 days in the covenant of marriage in peace and happiness. We did not leave one another, but it was the angel of heaven who has separated us, and I live with sadness and never-ending regret. She is one of the royal descendants of Hawaii nei, born of alii "Papa." From ancient times, her rank was of royalty, but she humbled herself, befriended and warmly welcomed newcomers, she was loving, and she was kind in actions and words, and she was a follower of the Lord.

== Bibliography ==
- American Board of Commissioners for Foreign Missions (1848). The Missionary Herald. Vol. 44. Boston: Press of T. R. Marvin. OCLC 1758344.
- Bingham, Hiram (1855) [1848]. A Residence of Twenty-one Years in the Sandwich Islands (Third ed.). Canadaigua, NY: H. D. Goodwin. OCLC 557953377.
- Cooke, Amos Starr; Cooke, Juliette Montague (1937). Richards, Mary Atherton (ed.). The Chiefs' Children School: A Record Compiled from the Diary and Letters of Amos Starr Cooke and Juliette Montague Cooke, by Their Granddaughter Mary Atherton Richards. Honolulu: Honolulu Star-Bulletin. OCLC 1972890.
- Dibble, Sheldon (1843). History of the Sandwich Islands. Lahainaluna: Press of the Mission Seminary. OCLC 2145112.
- Gilman, Gorham D. (1970). Sharpless, Jean S.; Greer, Richard A. (eds.). "1848 – Honolulu As It Is – Notes for Amplification". The Hawaiian Journal of History. 4. Honolulu: Hawaiian Historical Society: 105–156. hdl:10524/253. OCLC 60626541.
- Gregg, David L. (1982). King, Pauline (ed.). The Diaries of David Lawrence Gregg: An American Diplomat in Hawaii, 1853–1858. Honolulu: Hawaiian Historical Society. ISBN 9780824808617. OCLC 8773139.
- Kaeo, Peter; Queen Emma (1976). Korn, Alfons L. (ed.). News from Molokai, Letters Between Peter Kaeo & Queen Emma, 1873–1876. Honolulu: The University Press of Hawaii. hdl:10125/39980. ISBN 978-0-8248-0399-5. OCLC 2225064.
- Kanahele, George S. (1999). Emma: Hawaii's Remarkable Queen. Honolulu: University of Hawaii Press. ISBN 978-0-8248-2240-8. OCLC 40890919.
- Kanahele, George S. (2002) [1986]. Pauahi: The Kamehameha Legacy. Honolulu: Kamehameha Schools Press. ISBN 978-0-87336-005-0. OCLC 173653971.
- Kaomea, Julie (2014). "Education for Elimination in Nineteenth-Century Hawaiʻi: Settler Colonialism and the Native Hawaiian Chiefs' Children's Boarding School". History of Education Quarterly. 54 (2). New York: History of Education Society: 123–144. doi:10.1111/hoeq.12054. ISSN 0018-2680. OCLC 5571935029. S2CID 143224034.
- Krout, Mary B. (1908). The Memoirs of Bernice Pauabi Bishop. New York: The Knickerbocker Press. OCLC 4683252.
- Liliuokalani (1898). Hawaii's Story by Hawaii's Queen, Liliuokalani. Boston: Lee and Shepard. ISBN 978-0-548-22265-2. OCLC 2387226.
- McKinzie, Edith Kawelohea (1983). Stagner, Ishmael W. (ed.). Hawaiian Genealogies: Extracted from Hawaiian Language Newspapers. Vol. 1. Honolulu: University of Hawaii Press. ISBN 0-939154-28-5. OCLC 12555087.
- Menton, Linda K. (1981). "The Royal School 1839–1850". Educational Perspectives. The Journal of the University of Hawaii at Mānoa. 20 (3). Honolulu: University of Hawaii: 17–21. hdl:10125/47174. ISSN 0013-1849. OCLC 220851876.
- Van Dyke, Jon M. (2008). Who Owns the Crown Lands of Hawaiʻi?. Honolulu: University of Hawaii Press. ISBN 978-0-8248-6560-3. OCLC 257449971 – via Project MUSE.
- Wyllie, Robert Crichton (1845). Simmonds, P. L. (ed.). Notes on the Sandwich, Or Hawaiian Islands. London: Simmonds and Ward. pp. 125–139. OCLC 405778069.
