= William Hoapili Kaʻauwai =

Hawaiian high chief and politician (c. 1835–1874)

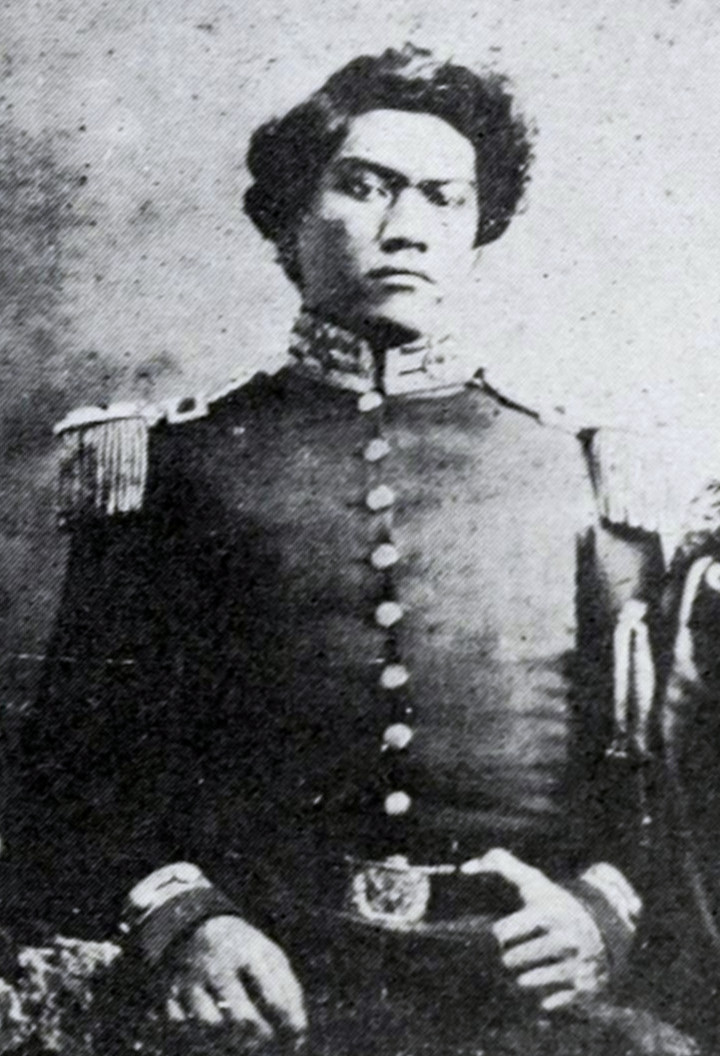
- Born: c. 1835
- Died: March 30, 1874 (aged 38–39); Honolulu, Oahu, Hawaiian Kingdom
- Burial place: Kawaiahaʻo Church
- Spouse(s): Kiliwehi; Keanolani (mistress)
- Children: William Hoapili Kaʻauwai II
- Parents: Zorobabela Kaʻauwai (father); Kalanikauleleiaiwi III (mother)

William Hoapili Kaʻauwai (c. 1835 – March 30, 1874) was a Hawaiian high chief and politician, and religious deacon of the Kingdom of Hawaii. He served two terms as a member of the House of Representatives of the Legislature of the Kingdom in 1862 and 1870. He became the only Native Hawaiian to be ordained a deacon of the Anglican Church of Hawaii and traveled with its founder Queen Emma to Europe between 1865 and 1866, circumnavigating the globe upon his return eastward via New Zealand.

== Early life ==
Kaʻauwai was born c. 1835, as the second son of Zorobabela Kaʻauwai and Kalanikauleleiaiwi III. His father was a successful Hawaiian politician, judge and entrepreneur who owed his rise to prominence to High Chief Hoapili, a trusted friend and companion of King Kamehameha I and the Governor of Maui, who became the child's namesake. Through his mother, he descended from the ancient Hawaiian Mōʻī of Maui, Piʻilani. His mother was also a relative of Governor Hoapili. He had three siblings: David Kahalekula Kaʻauwai (1835–1856), George Kaleiwohi Kaʻauwai (1843–1883) and a sister who died in infancy before 1848. His niece became Princess Elizabeth Kahanu Kalanianaʻole, wife of Prince Jonah Kūhiō Kalanianaʻole, the second Congressional Delegate from the Territory of Hawaii.

== Career and travel abroad ==
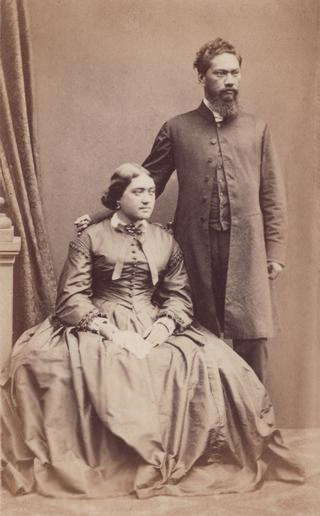
William Hoapili Kaʻauwai and Kiliwehi, in London, c. 1865

Kaʻauwai was elected and served two nonconsecutive terms as a member of the House of Representatives, the lower house of the Hawaiian legislature, for the district of Wailuku on the island of Maui. He was elected in 1862 and re-elected to serve a second term in 1870. His father Zorobabela and brother David had served as representative for Maui as well in the 1850s. At the time of his first election, he was regarded as less experienced than his elder brother David who was "one of the finest Hawaiian orators" of his time. However, he later proved himself to be an orator as capable as his father and brother.

On July 1, 1856, Kaʻauwai married Mary Ann Kiliwehi (1840–1873), daughter of High Chiefess Kuini Liliha, Governess of Oahu, but they had no children. He became an aide-de-camp to King Kamehameha IV and converted from Congregationalism to the Anglican Church of Hawaii established by the Anglophile monarch and his wife Queen Emma. On September 25, 1864, he was ordained as a deacon by Bishop Thomas Nettleship Staley in Lahaina, the only Native Hawaiian to have this distinction, and afterward assisted the Archdeacon Reverend George Mason on the island of Maui.

Queen Emma's travel to Europe and the United States (1865–1866)

After Kamehameha IV's death, Queen Emma decided to travel to England to solicit donations for erecting a cathedral in Honolulu and continued the legacy of her husband. She chose Kaʻauwai to be her chaplain and his wife Kiliwehi as her lady-in-waiting to accompany her on this trip. From 1865 to 1866, they traveled with the queen to Panama, England, Italy, and the French Rivera. At Florence, he request to return home and continue his clerical duties was granted; Kiliwehi was also later permitted to return with him. They returned to London where they proceeded on to Auckland, New Zealand without the knowledge or permission of Queen Emma or King Kamehameha V. Prior to leaving England, Kaʻauwai had written to the Hawaiian Minister of Finance Charles Coffin Harris indicating they intended to take a "rather long round-about, and slow way toward home". Unknown to the Hawaiian government, Kaʻauwai went to New Zealand to recruit Māori immigrants to settle in the Kingdom of Hawaii. Later sources indicate Kaʻauwai was somewhat successful in his venture, but his request to proceed with the negotiations were denied by the Hawaiian government and they demanded he return home. By this time, Queen Emma had already returned to Hawaii. After his return to Honolulu, he was shunned by King Kamehameha V because of his treatment of Queen Emma and the unauthorized visit to New Zealand.

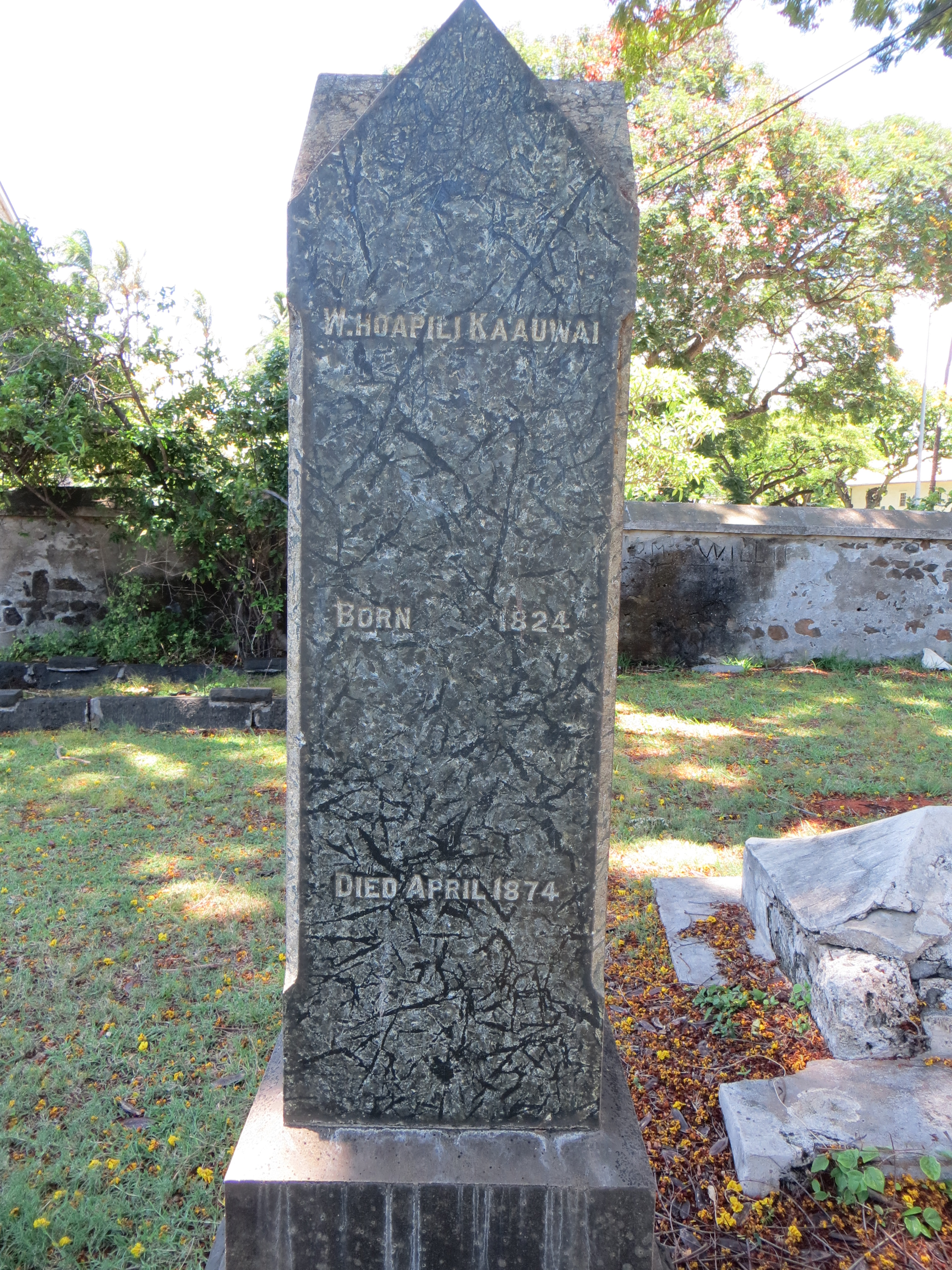
Gravestone at the Kawaiahaʻo Church

Domestic relations between Kaʻauwai and his wife worsened and in one incident, he placed a gun to her head and attempted to shoot her. Kiliwehi filed for divorce on April 22, 1872; the case went to trial on September 12 and she was granted a temporary decree which was made absolute on June 18, 1873. While married to Kiliwehi, he was known to have been unfaithful, although this was not brought up in the divorce suit. With his mistress Keanolani (or Keauookalau, the wife of Lihilihi, of Kauai), he had an illegitimate son named William Hoapili Kaʻauwai II, born on January 31, 1874.

== Return to politics and death ==
Kaʻauwai developed pulmonary tuberculosis and his health was worsened by his drinking habit. These health issues did not completely hinder his return to active political life. He was re-elected to the legislature of 1870. He also took an active part in the 1874 election following the death of King Lunalilo and became a supporter of Kalākaua against his former patron Queen Emma. After Kalākaua ascended to the throne, he appointed Kaʻauwai as his Court Chamberlain. He was preparing to depart with the king on his tour of the islands when he died of a heart attack, in Honolulu, on March 30, 1874.

His remains were interred in an underground family vault at the cemetery of the Kawaiahaʻo Church. The burial site later became known as the Kapiʻolani family plot where relatives of King Kalākaua, Queen Kapiʻolani and of Princess Elizabeth Kahanu Kalanianaʻole (including her parents) were buried. Today, an obelisk marks where the Kapiʻolani family plot is located.

== Bibliography ==
- Hawaii (1918). Lydecker, Robert Colfax (ed.). Roster Legislatures of Hawaii, 1841–1918. Honolulu: Hawaiian Gazette Company. OCLC 60737418.
- Kaeo, Peter; Queen Emma (1976). Korn, Alfons L. (ed.). News from Molokai, Letters Between Peter Kaeo & Queen Emma, 1873–1876. Honolulu: The University Press of Hawaii. hdl:10125/39980. ISBN 978-0-8248-0399-5. OCLC 2225064.
- Kanahele, George S. (1999). Emma: Hawaii's Remarkable Queen. Honolulu: University of Hawaii Press. ISBN 978-0-8248-2240-8. OCLC 40890919.
- Lange, Raeburn (2006). Island Ministers: Indigenous Leadership in Nineteenth Century Pacific Islands Christianity (PDF). Christchurch, New Zealand: Macmillan Brown Centre for Pacific Studies, University of Canterbury. ISBN 978-1-74076-176-5. Archived from the original (PDF) on February 23, 2017.
- McKinzie, Edith Kawelohea (1983). Stagner, Ishmael W. (ed.). Hawaiian Genealogies: Extracted from Hawaiian Language Newspapers. Vol. 1. Honolulu: University of Hawaii Press. ISBN 0-939154-28-5. OCLC 12555087.
- Muir, Andrew Forest (1952). "William Hoapili Kaauwai: A Hawaiian in Holy Orders". Sixty-First Annual Report of the Hawaiian Historical Society for the Year 1952. 61. Honolulu: Hawaiian Historical Society: 5–13. hdl:10524/48. OCLC 722778378.
- Peterson, Barbara Bennett (1984). Notable Women of Hawaii. Honolulu: University of Hawaii Press. ISBN 978-0-8248-0820-4. OCLC 11030010.
