= Elizabeth Kahanu Kalanianaʻole =

- Princess of Hawaiʻi
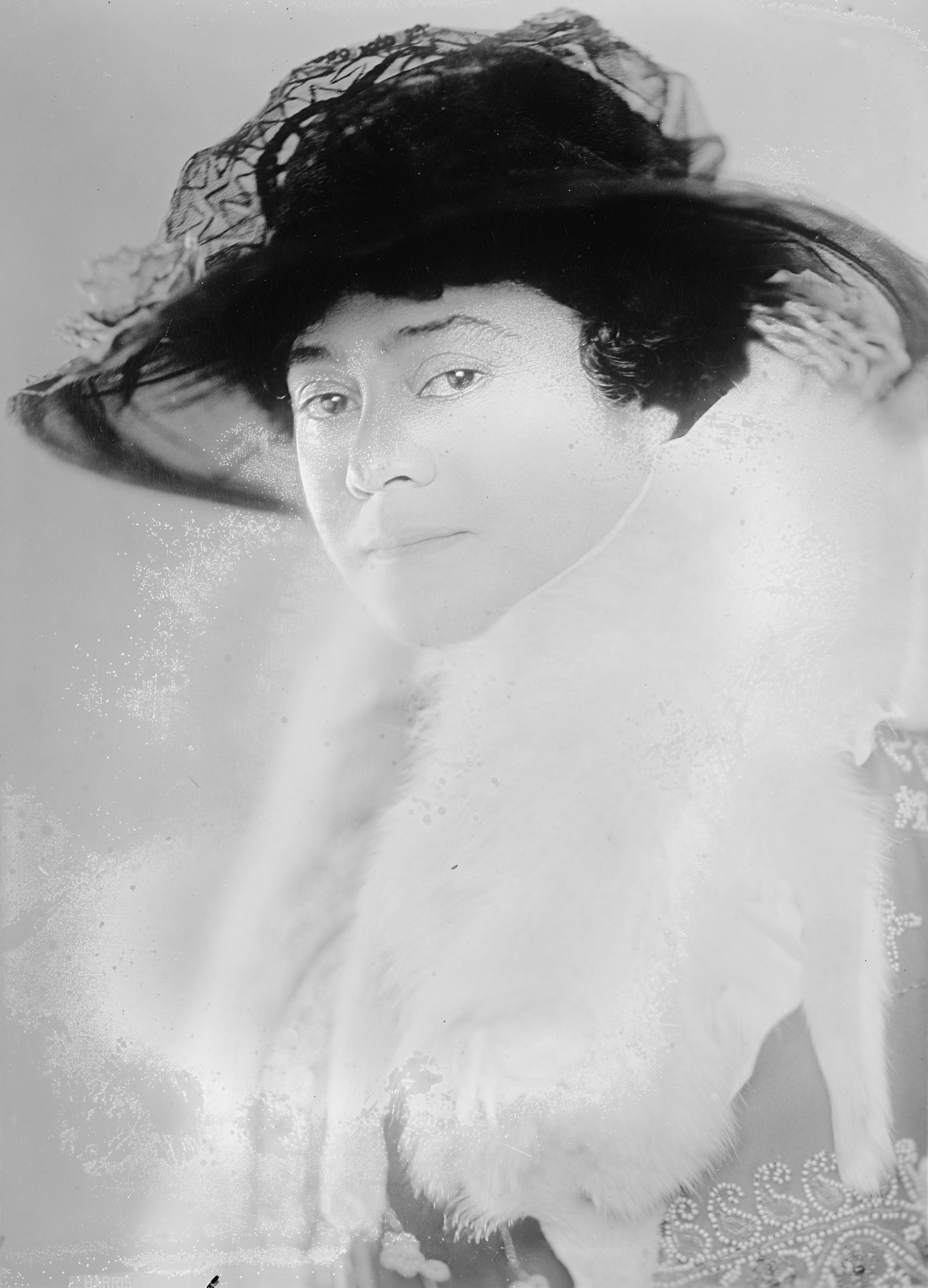
- Born: March 8, 1878; Makawao, Maui
- Died: February 20, 1932 (aged 52); Honolulu, Oʻahu
- Burial: Oahu Cemetery
- Spouse: Jonah Kūhiō Kalanianaʻole; James Frank Woods
Names
- Elizabeth Kahanu Kaʻauwai Kalanianaʻole
- Father: George Kaleiwohi Kaʻauwai
- Mother: Ulalia Muolo Keaweaheulu Laʻanui

Elizabeth Kahanu Kaʻauwai Kalanianaʻole Woods (March 8, 1879 – February 19, 1932) was the wife of Prince Jonah Kūhiō Kalanianaʻole, Hawaii's second delegate to Congress.

== Early life ==
She was born in Makawao, Maui on March 8, 1878, and during her childhood was a protégée of Queen Kapiʻolani. Kalanianaʻole's father was a lesser chief of the island of Maui named George Kaleiwohi Kaʻauwai (1843–1883) and his wife (Elizabeth's mother) was Ulalia Muolo Keaweaheulu Laʻanui (1848–1911). Her family descends from the ancient Mo'i of Maui. Her grandfather was early Hawaiian statesman Zorobabela Kaʻauwai while William Hoapili Kaʻauwai, the first ordained Hawaiian Anglican priest, and his wife High Chiefess Mary Ann Kiliwehi (daughter of Liliha), who both accompanied Queen Emma on her visit to Queen Victoria in the 1860s, were her aunt and uncle. She was educated at the Sacred Hearts Academy.

== Marriage to Kūhiō ==
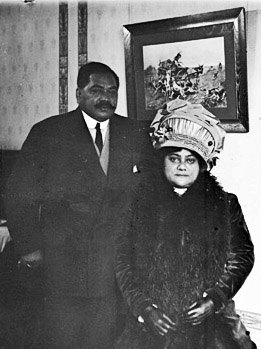
Photograph of Prince and Princess Kalanianaʻole, posed in a room in Chicago, Illinois.

Elizabeth met Kūhiō in 1895 after his participation in the failed Wilcox Rebellion had brought him into jail for almost a year. Kahanu brought him food, and sang songs to break his isolation. Just after he was released she married Prince Kūhiō on October 8, 1896. Their wedding was held in the Saint Andrew's Cathedral in Honolulu, Oahu.

She and her husband decided that they would leave Hawaii for a while since the monarchy was overthrown and hopes of restoration were dim. For two years she and Kūhiō traveled in Europe and South Africa as wealthy "nobility" and were usually recognized as royals even though the Kingdom had been overthrown. However, once a German count in Geneva, Switzerland, referred loudly to their dark skin color. Her husband used his boxing skill to knock the man out. As time passed her husband lost his feeling of bitterness and wanted to be back in the middle of the action in the Territory of Hawaii.

They arrived home in September 1901 and settled at Pualeilani, the Waikiki home they had inherited from Kūhiō's aunt, Queen Kapiʻolani (where she died).

== Description ==
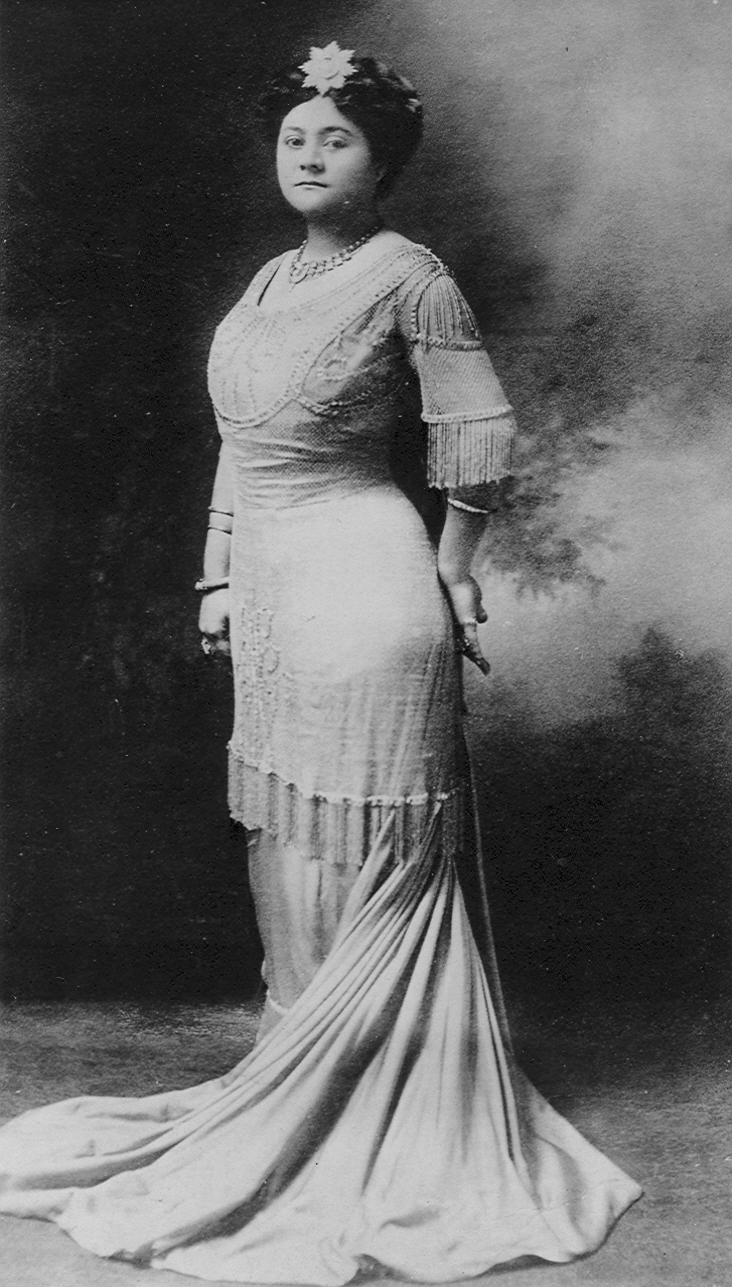
Photograph of Princess Kalanianaʻole

In Jack London and Hawaii by Charmian London, Princess Elizabeth is described as:

... a gorgeous creature that eclipsed the handsome look of her husband Kuhio. Her bigness was a trifle overwhelming to one new to the physical aristocracy of the island people. One would hesitate to call her fat, she was just big, sumptuos, bearing her splendid proportions with the remarkable poise that had already been noticed in Hawaiian women, only more magnificently. Her bare shoulders were described as beautiful, the pose of her head majestic, with heavy fine dark hair that showed bronze lights in its wavy mass. She was superbly gowned in silk that had a touch of purple or lilac about it, just the tone for her full black, calm eyes and war, tawny skin. For these of chiefly blood are many shades fairer than the commoners. Jack London and Charmian London agreed that they could not expect ever to behold a more queenly woman. The descriptive powers of these were exasperatingly inept to picture the manner in which the Princess stood, touching with hers the hands of all who passed before her, with a brief, graceful droop of her fine head, and a fleeting, perfunctory, yet graciouse flash of little teeth under her small fine mouth. Glorious she was, the Princess Kalanianaʻole, every inch a princess in the very tropical essence of her. Always shall I remember her as resplendent exotic flower, swaying and bending its head with unaffected, innate grace. And the Princess Elizabeth Kalanianaʻole has set an example, a pattern, that will make us full critical of royal women of any blood.

== Death ==
In 1917, Kūhiō's aunt, Queen Liliʻuokalani, died at her home in Washington Place. Elizabeth and Kūhiō were at her bedside. On January 7, 1922, Kūhiō died and was interred in the Royal Mausoleum of Hawaii. Using her own funds, Elizabeth converted the original tomb building into a memorial chapel for her husband which was dedicated on March 26, 1923. The Hawaii Territorial Legislature later reimbursed her for the expenses.

She was appointed to fill her husband's place as a member of the Hawaiian Home Commission. She remarried to James Frank Woods in 1923. Woods was widower of Eva Parker Woods, daughter of Samuel Parker, who was the first Republican candidate for congressional delegate, and himself a great-grandson of Parker Ranch founder John Palmer Parker. She also was an influential leader in the Hawaii suffragist movement and traveled around the islands teaching local women about their rights to vote.

She died at Queen's Hospital on February 19, 1932. She had been president of the Native Sons and Daughters of Hawaii, Honourable President of the Kaʻahumanu Society, regent of Hui Kalama, and Moi of the Daughters and Sons of Hawaiian Warriors. Because of poor financial management and the couples' generosity to the Hawaiian people, most of her first husband and her own wealth had been depleted by the time of her death and many artifacts of the Hawaiian royal family had to be auctioned to pay off the debt on her estate. She was buried in the O'ahu Cemetery next to her second husband, Sec 9.
