= Joshua Kaʻeo =

American judge

- Born: c. 1808
- Died: June 27, 1858 (age 50); Honolulu
- Burial: June 30, 1858; Pohukaina Tomb; October 30, 1865; Mauna ʻAla Royal Mausoleum
- Spouse: Jane Lahilahi Young
- Issue: Peter Kaʻeo; Keliʻimaikai Kaʻeo
- Father: Asa Kaʻeo
- Mother: Paaluanui

Joshua Kaʻeo (c. 1808 – June 27, 1858), was a Hawaiian high chief or nobleman of Hawaii Island descent, the uncle of Queen Emma of Hawaii, and an early Hawaiian politician and advisor of Kamehameha III.

His father was Asa Kaʻeo, a grandson or son of Manoua, the daughter of King Kalaniʻōpuʻu and one of his wives, Mulehu, from a noble family of the Kaʻū district; Mulehu was also the grandmother of Abner Pākī (one of Kaʻeo's own contemporaries) through a second marriage and great-grandmother of Bernice Pauahi Bishop. His mother is named Paaluanui. He was distant cousin to Kamehameha I since his great (great) grandfather Kalaniʻōpuʻu was Kamehameha I's half-uncle.

He was member of the King's Privy Council from 1845 to 1850 and a member of House of Nobles from 1845 to 1856. At one time, he was the Judge of the Supreme Court of Hawaii from 1844 to 1848, succeeding Zorobabela Kaʻauwai who resigned in November, 1846.

He married Jane Lahilahi Young, the hapa-haole (part-Hawaiian) daughter of John Young and his wife Kaʻōanaʻeha, the niece of Kamehameha I. Kaʻeo and Lahilahi had two sons:

- Peter Young Kekuaokalani Kaeo (1836–1880), he was given as a hānai child (adopted) to Jane's brother Keoni Ana and his wife Julia Alapai. Educated at Royal School, he became a member of the House of Nobles but later contracted leprosy and was sent to leper colony at Kalawao.
- Keliʻimaikai Kaʻeo, nicknamed "Alebada" (died October 13, 1851), he was given as a hānai child to Jane's other brother James Kanehoa and his wife Sarah Kale Davis. He was named after Jane's ancestor Keliʻimaikaʻi, Kamehameha's only full brother.
