= Abigail Maheha =

Hawaiian chiefess (1832–1861)

- Born: July 10, 1832
- Died: February 13, 1861 (aged 28); Hale Aliʻi, Honolulu, Oahu
- Spouse: Keaupuni; Kiaʻaina Wahineaea
- Issue: Keanolani
- Father: Namaile
- Mother: Kuini Liliha

Abigail Maheha (July 10, 1832 – February 13, 1861) was a Hawaiian chiefess (aliʻi) of the Kingdom of Hawaii. At a young age, she was chosen to attend the Chiefs' Children's School (later renamed the Royal School) taught by the American missionary Amos Starr Cooke and his wife, Juliette Montague Cooke, alongside her half-sister Jane Loeau and fourteen of her royal cousins.

== Early life and education ==
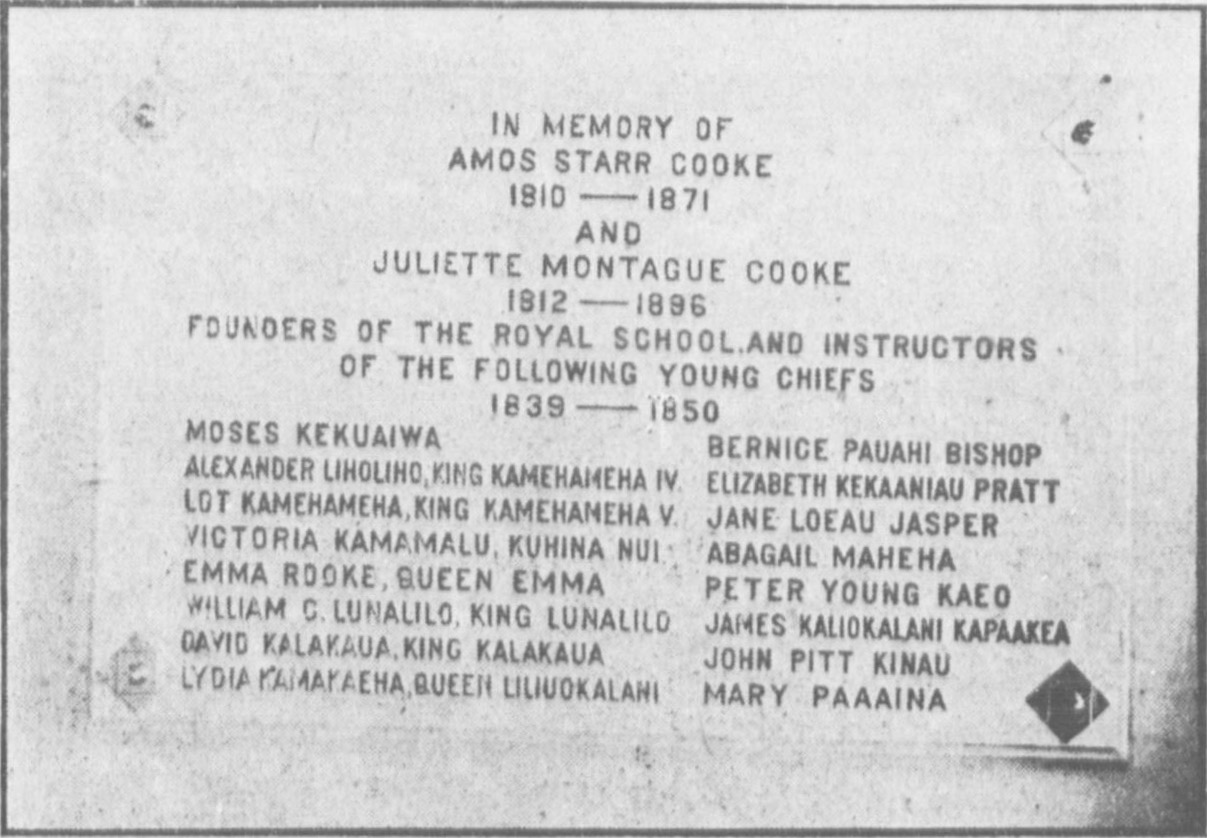
The Cooke Memorial Tablet at Kawaiahaʻo Church commemorating the sixteen royal children and their teachers

Maheha was the daughter of High Chief Namaile and High Chiefess Kuini Liliha. Her mother was the royal governor of Oʻahu during the regency of Queen Kaʻahumanu. She was descended from Kahekili II, Moi of Maui, and High Chief Hoapili.

She was adopted or hānaied by her aunt, Princess Kekauʻōnohi. Her hānai mother was a granddaughter of Kamehameha the Great who united the Hawaiian Islands into one kingdom and was also the youngest consort of the deceased Kamehameha II and served as Governor of Kauaʻi.

She was among those chosen by King Kamehameha III eligible for throne of the Kingdom of Hawaii to attend the Chiefs' Children's School, also known as the Royal School. She was taught by American missionaries Amos Starr Cooke and his wife Juliette Montague Cooke. In the classroom students were divided by their age and length of time at the school. She was a member of the senior level class with her half-sister Jane Loeau. During their Sunday procession to church it was customary for boys and girls to walk side by side; Abigail walked beside Alexander Liholiho, the future King Kamehameha IV.

American merchant Gorham D. Gilman visited the Royal School in 1848, after both Jane and Abigail had left the school. He commented on the two sisters' education, declining family rank and inability to support themselves:

The two female pupils who have left were two sisters—who had been educated at the school and remained in it until they were married. These two are of an ancient family wh[ich] was formerly of rank and importance among the other high families—but adversity and losses have taken from them the most of their lands and influence—they however are acknowledged by the Court as of rank but have not the means of supporting it. The two misses were pleasant agreeable young ladies—of good capability—and who made considerable advances in their studies particularly the elder wh[o] was a Compan[ion] of Miss B.s [Bernice Pauahi] and who like her played & sang as well and painted and drew very prettily—and gave evidence that their teachers had not been remiss in the discharge of their duties to them but done all they could to fit them for life.

== Marriages ==
Maheha became pregnant while at Royal School. Her instructions ended on January 18, 1847, and she left the school on February 4. She was married off to commoner Keaupuni on February 3, 1847, in Honolulu. Maheha gave birth to a daughter Keanolani (sometimes written as Keano; 1847–1902), on Kauaʻi, five months after the marriage. The child was not Keaupuni's as it was later acknowledged by a witness named Mele during the divorce case. According to later tradition was the illegitimate daughter of Maheha with her classmate Lot Kapuāiwa, who later became King Kamehameha V from 1864 to 1872. Keanolani was raised by Princess Ruth Keʻelikōlani, the half-sister of Kamehameha V. When she died in 1902, Keanolani's parentage was scrutinized by the English language press. King Kamehameha V died December 11, 1872, without acknowledging Keanolani or naming an heir to the throne.

In 1855, Keaupuni was involved in the Hawaii Supreme Court case Keaupuni vs. Fred. Ogden. The plaintiff sought to recover damages from the defendant for criminal conversation with the plaintiff's wife, Abigail Maheha. The indecisive jury were discharged by the Court after an absence of four hours. They eventually divorced. She married Kiaʻaina Wahineaea on July 17, 1857, on Kauaʻi. Her first name was spelled "Apigaila" on the marriage record.

She died in Hale Aliʻi, Honolulu, on February 13, 1861.

== Bibliography ==
- Cooke, Amos Starr; Cooke, Juliette Montague (1937). Richards, Mary Atherton (ed.). The Chiefs' Children School: A Record Compiled from the Diary and Letters of Amos Starr Cooke and Juliette Montague Cooke, by Their Granddaughter Mary Atherton Richards. Honolulu: Honolulu Star-Bulletin. OCLC 1972890.
- Dibble, Sheldon (1843). History of the Sandwich Islands. Lahainaluna: Press of the Mission Seminary. OCLC 2145112.
- Gilman, Gorham D. (1970). Sharpless, Jean S.; Greer, Richard A. (eds.). "1848 – Honolulu As It Is – Notes for Amplification". The Hawaiian Journal of History. 4. Honolulu: Hawaiian Historical Society: 105–156. hdl:10524/253. OCLC 60626541.
- Kam, Ralph Thomas (2017). Death Rites and Hawaiian Royalty: Funerary Practices in the Kamehameha and Kalakaua Dynasties, 1819–1953. S. I.: McFarland, Incorporated, Publishers. ISBN 978-1-4766-6846-8. OCLC 966566652.
- Kanahele, George S. (1999). Emma: Hawaii's Remarkable Queen. Honolulu: University of Hawaii Press. ISBN 978-0-8248-2240-8. OCLC 40890919.
- Kanahele, George S. (2002) [1986]. Pauahi: The Kamehameha Legacy. Honolulu: Kamehameha Schools Press. ISBN 978-0-87336-005-0. OCLC 173653971.
- Kaomea, Julie (2014). "Education for Elimination in Nineteenth-Century Hawaiʻi: Settler Colonialism and the Native Hawaiian Chiefs' Children's Boarding School". History of Education Quarterly. 54 (2). New York: History of Education Society: 123–144. doi:10.1111/hoeq.12054. ISSN 0018-2680. OCLC 5571935029. S2CID 143224034.
- Krout, Mary B. (1908). The Memoirs of Bernice Pauabi Bishop. New York: The Knickerbocker Press. OCLC 4683252.
- Liliuokalani (1898). Hawaii's Story by Hawaii's Queen, Liliuokalani. Boston: Lee and Shepard. ISBN 978-0-548-22265-2. OCLC 2387226.
- McKinzie, Edith Kawelohea (1983). Stagner, Ishmael W. (ed.). Hawaiian Genealogies: Extracted from Hawaiian Language Newspapers. Vol. 1. Honolulu: University of Hawaii Press. ISBN 0-939154-28-5. OCLC 12555087.
- Menton, Linda K. (1981). "The Royal School 1839–1850". Educational Perspectives. The Journal of the University of Hawaii at Mānoa. 20 (3). Honolulu: University of Hawaii: 17–21. hdl:10125/47174. ISSN 0013-1849. OCLC 220851876.
- Van Dyke, Jon M. (2008). Who Owns the Crown Lands of Hawaiʻi?. Honolulu: University of Hawaii Press. ISBN 978-0-8248-6560-3. OCLC 257449971.
- Wyllie, Robert Crichton (1845). Simmonds, P. L. (ed.). Notes on the Sandwich, Or Hawaiian Islands. London: Simmonds and Ward. pp. 125–139. OCLC 405778069.
