= Kuini Liliha =

Royal Governor of Oahu (c. 1802–1839)

- Royal Governor of Oʻahu
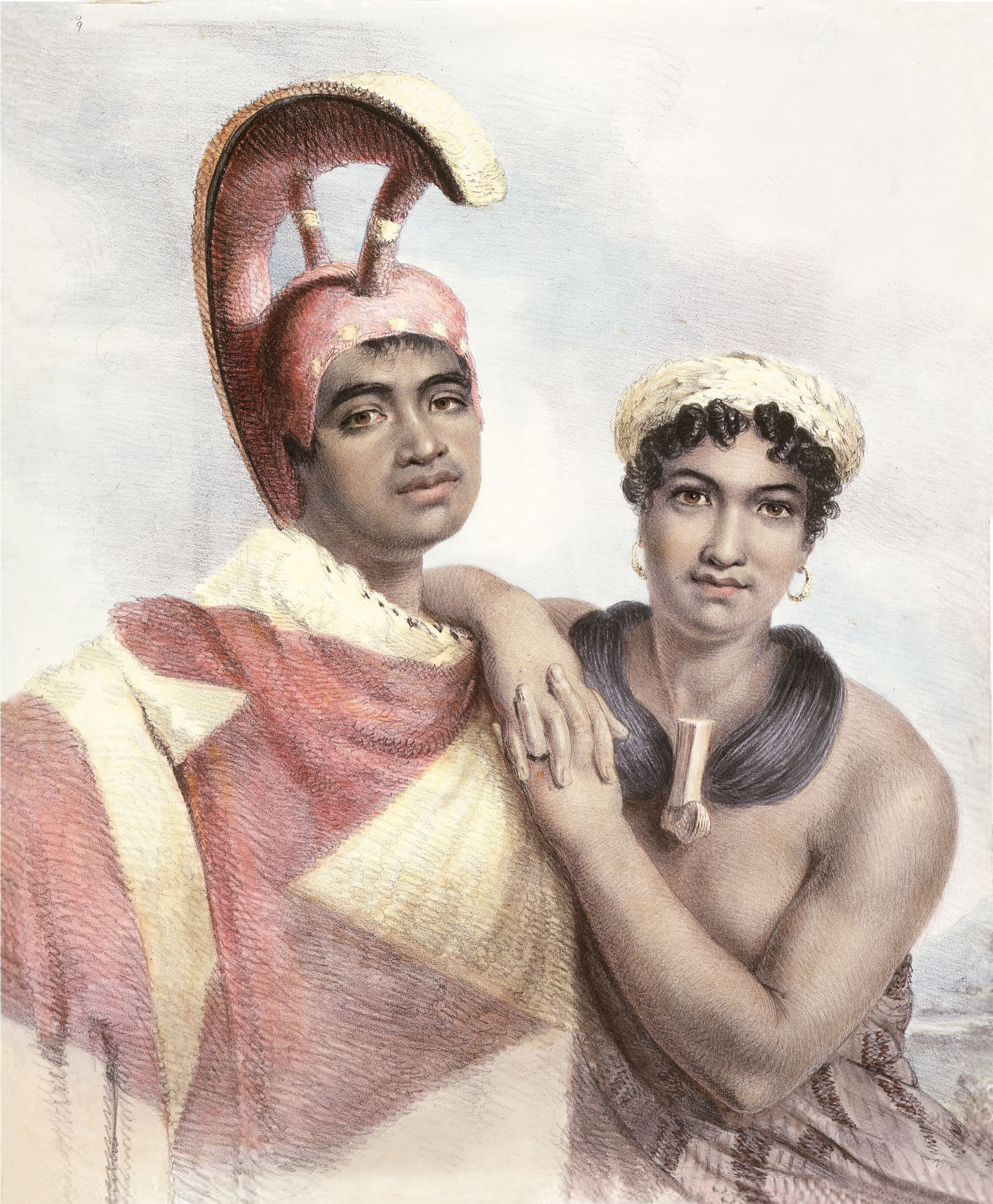
- Boki (left) with Liliha (right)
- Born: c. 1802
- Died: August 25, 1839; Honolulu, Oʻahu, Kingdom of Hawaii
- Burial: Mokuʻula then Waineʻe Cemetery
- Spouse: Kahalaiʻa Luanuʻu; Boki; Kalaniulumoku; Namaile or Kamaile; Haalou; Kulinui
- Issue: Jane Loeau; Aberahama Kaikioewa Palekaluhi; Pius F. Koakanu; Abigail Maheha; Kailinoa; Mary Ann Kiliwehi
- Father: Koakanu; Ulumāheihei Hoapili (hānai)
- Mother: Loeau; Kalilikauoha (hānai)

Kuini Liliha (c. 1802–1839) was a High Chiefess (aliʻi) and noblewoman who served the Kingdom of Hawaii as royal governor of Oʻahu island. She administered the island from 1829 to 1831 following the death of her husband Boki.

== Early life ==
She was born in 1802. Her father was Ulumāheihei Hoapili, a son of Kameʻeiamoku, one of the nīʻaupiʻo (highest noble rank) twin brothers. Her mother was High Chiefess Kalilikauoha of Maui, who was the daughter of King Kahekili II of Maui and his half-sister bride Luahiwa. Some genealogists say Liliha was only adopted by Hoapili, but the practice known as hānai was considered a bond as strong as a blood relation. According to them, she was the biological daughter of Koakanu, a son or grandson of Kaolohaka-a-Keawe, one of the many issues of Keaweʻīkekahialiʻiokamoku; and his wife High Chiefess Loeau. Her name means "heartsick queen" in the Hawaiian language. She had no siblings.

Liliha was initially married to Kahalaiʻa Luanuʻu, a nephew of Kamehameha I. However, his uncle Boki, an advisor and friend to King Kamehameha II, took her from Kahalaiʻa as his wife after his previous wife Likelike was taken by his older brother Kalanimoku.

== United Kingdom ==
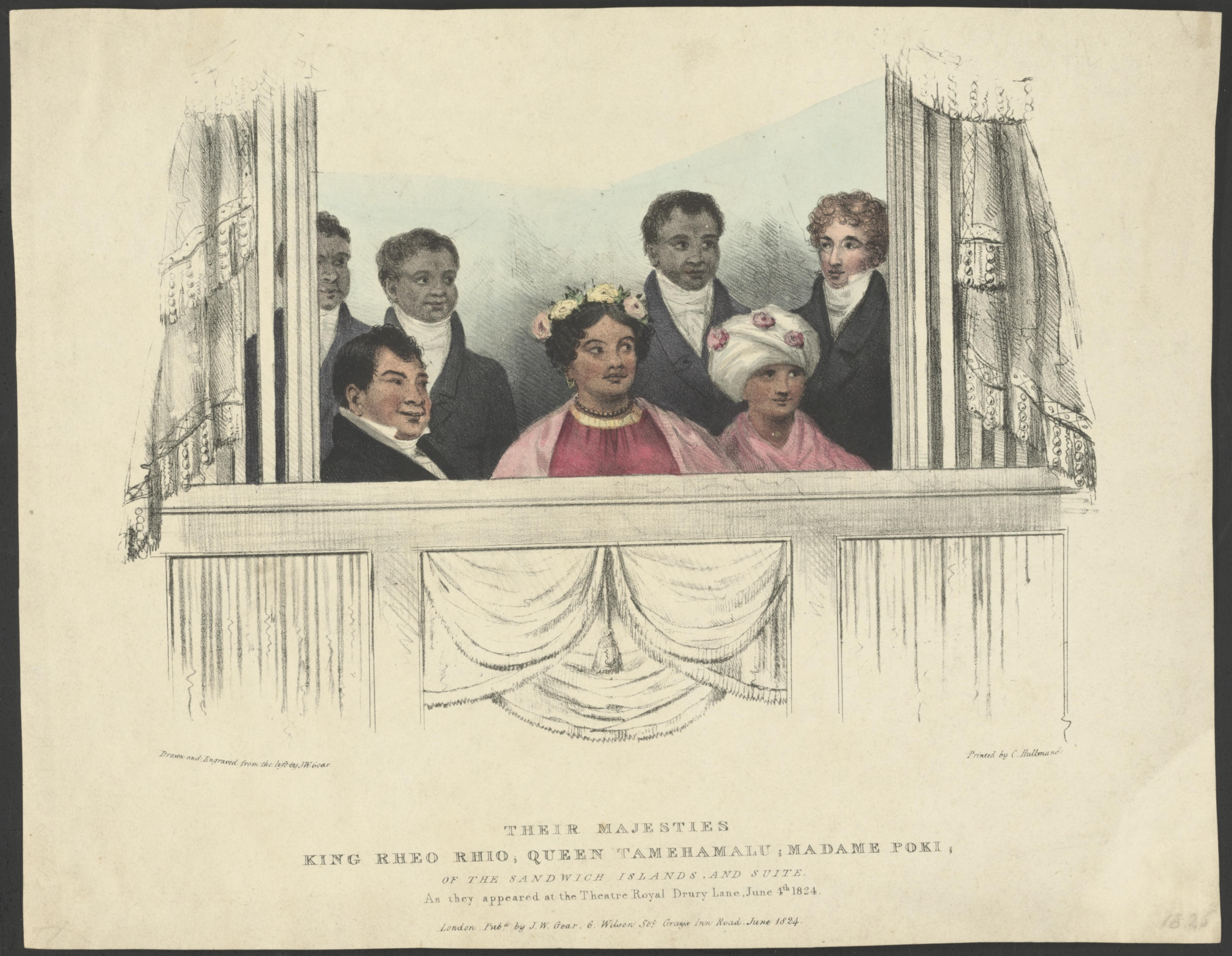
In the royal box at London, 1824. Liliha was known as Madame Poke in London.

Boki, Liliha, and Mataio Kekūanaōʻa were principal members of the entourage that accompanied King Kamehameha II and Queen Kamāmalu on an 1824 diplomatic tour of the United Kingdom, visiting King George IV. The entire delegation contracted the measles, since native Hawaiians had no immunity to the disease. As a result, Queen Kamāmalu and several chiefs died, including Kamehameha II who was so distraught after his Queen's death that he died in Liliha's arms.

Boki and Liliha survived the measles and Boki took charge of what was left of the delegation. They managed to secure agreements of friendship from the British government. The Kingdom of Hawaii also became a protectorate of the British military under those agreements. Boki and Liliha returned to Oʻahu with the bodies of Kamehameha II and Kamāmalu in 1825 on the British warship HMS Blonde. On the return journey, Liliha, Kekūanaōʻa and Manuia were baptized by the Blonde's chaplain Richard Rowland Bloxam.

== Catholicism ==
Liliha became embroiled in the dispute over freedom of religion in the kingdom. Kaʻahumanu was a widow of Kamehameha I, and held great power as Kuhina Nui or chief advisor during the reigns of both Kamehameha II and Kauikeaouli (Kamehameha III). She had been influenced by the Protestant missionaries in Honolulu and was baptized into the Congregational church. Heeding the advice of her Congregationalist ministers, Kaʻahumanu convinced King Kamehameha III to ban the Roman Catholic Church from the islands.

The priests and lay brothers of the Congregation of the Sacred Hearts of Jesus and Mary were forcibly deported from the kingdom. Native Hawaiians who had converted were persecuted. Some were beaten and imprisoned. When Kaʻahumanu discovered that Boki and Liliha were among the first chiefs to convert to the suppressed Hawaii Church it angered the queen regent, who wanted all the chiefs to accept Protestantism in order that all Hawaiians would follow. Kuini Liliha's steadfastness in her Catholicism influenced Native Hawaiian Catholics to persevere even in suppression. Only after the intervention of the French government and Captain Cyrille-Pierre-Théodore Laplace and Kamehameha III's proclamation of the Edict of Toleration did Hawaiians like Kuini Liliha have the legal right of membership in the Hawaii Catholic Church.

== Royal governor ==
As royal governor, Boki incurred large debts from the foreigners and attempted to cover them by traveling to the New Hebrides to harvest sandalwood. Before departing in 1829, Boki entrusted administration of Oʻahu to his wife. One of her new responsibilities was to become legal guardian and sole trustee of the properties of Kamehameha III, who had become king as a child. This was opposed by Kaʻahumanu who was ruling Hawaii as queen regent and had developed a rivalry with Liliha. About this time, Kaʻahumanu forced Liliha to give up some of her land in an area known as Punahou to missionary Hiram Bingham I. This eventually became the site of Punahou School, also known as Oʻahu College, for the children of the missionaries.

Boki and his entourage were lost at sea and pronounced dead, leaving Liliha in administration as royal governor. On April 1, 1831, Kaʻahumanu heard rumors of a planned rebellion, so sent Hoapili to remove Liliha of her power, replacing her with Kaʻahumanu's own brother, John Adams Kuakini as governor of Oʻahu. In November 1833 (after Kaʻahumanu's death and Kamehameha III came to age) some chiefs planned to back her as Kuhina Nui, a position similar to prime minister or as powerful as co-regent. Instead, Hoapili put his support behind Elizabeth Kīnaʻu, who also acted as governor of Oʻahu with Kuakini returning to the island of Hawaiʻi.

== Legacy ==
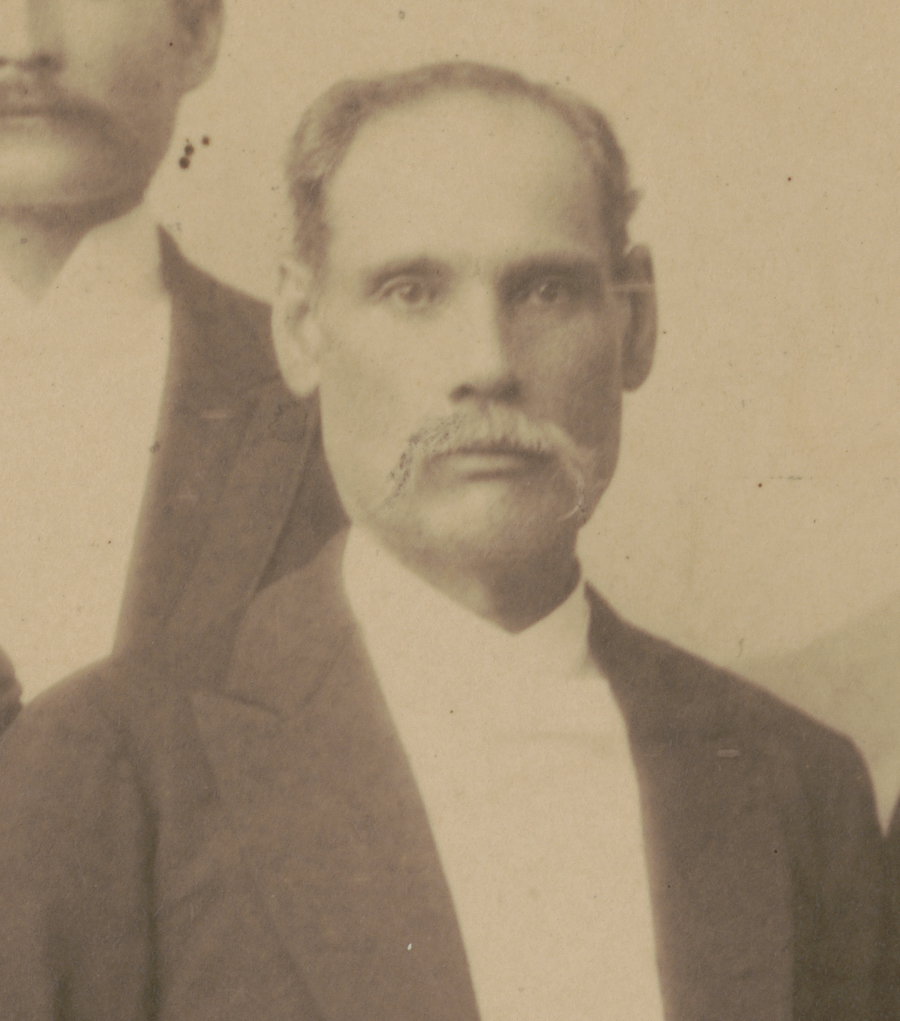
Son Aberahama Kaikioewa Palekaluhi, 1893

Liliha had numerous other husbands and partners. In fact, she was probably the most married chiefess during her lifetime; she had a document seven partners or husbands. Besides Kahalaiʻa Luanuʻu and Boki, she married Kalaniulumoku and Namaile by whom she had daughters, Jane Loeau (1828–1873), and Abigail Maheha (1832–1861), respectively. King Kamehameha III declared both eligible for the Hawaiian throne, and they were sent to the Chiefs' Children's School later known as the Royal School in Honolulu. With Kulinui she had a son, Aberahama Kaikioewa Palekaluhi (1830–1912). With Namaile or Kamaile, she had a son, John F. or Pius F. Koakanu (died 1885) and two daughters, Maheha (mentioned above) and Kailinoa. With Haalou she had another daughter Mary Ann Kiliwehi (1840–1873).

She died on August 24, 1839, in Honolulu and was buried on the sacred island of Mokuʻula on Maui. Later she was reburied in the Waineʻe cemetery. Although treated as a rebel by Kaʻahumanu, she was generally loved by the people. For example, a traditional hula chant honors her memory. A street is named for her in Honolulu.

== Bibliography ==
- Bingham, Hiram (1855) [1848]. A Residence of Twenty-one Years in the Sandwich Islands (Third ed.). Canadaigua, NY: H. D. Goodwin. OCLC 557953377.
- Kam, Ralph Thomas (2017). Death Rites and Hawaiian Royalty: Funerary Practices in the Kamehameha and Kalakaua Dynasties, 1819–1953. S. I.: McFarland, Incorporated, Publishers. ISBN 978-1-4766-6846-8. OCLC 966566652.
- Kamakau, Samuel (1992) [1961]. Ruling Chiefs of Hawaii (Revised ed.). Honolulu: Kamehameha Schools Press. ISBN 0-87336-014-1. OCLC 25008795.
- McKinzie, Edith Kawelohea (1983). Stagner, Ishmael W. (ed.). Hawaiian Genealogies: Extracted from Hawaiian Language Newspapers. Vol. 1. Honolulu: University of Hawaii Press. ISBN 0-939154-28-5. OCLC 12555087.
- Van Dyke, Jon M. (2008). Who Owns the Crown Lands of Hawaiʻi?. Honolulu: University of Hawaii Press. ISBN 978-0-8248-6560-3. OCLC 257449971 – via Project MUSE.
- Wyllie, Robert Crichton (1845). Simmonds, P. L. (ed.). Notes on the Sandwich, Or Hawaiian Islands. London: Simmonds and Ward. pp. 125–139. OCLC 405778069.

Preceded by Boki	Royal Governor of Oʻahu; 1829 – 1831	Succeeded by John Adams Kuakini
