= Lilikalā Kameʻeleihiwa =

Hawaiian scholar

Lilikalā K. Kameʻeleihiwa is a Hawaiian historian, filmmaker, and senior professor at the University of Hawaiʻi's Kamakakūokalani Center for Hawaiian Studies. Her earliest work was published under the name of Lilikalā L. Dorton.

With a PhD. from University of Hawaii Manoa in Pacific and Hawaiian History, she is also an expert in Hawaiian cultural traditions and in the issues driving the Hawaiian sovereignty movement. She served as a co-scriptwriter of the 1993 award-winning documentary Act of War: The Overthrow of the Hawaiian Nation.

Fluent in the Hawaiian language, she has served as protocol officer and crew for the double hulled Polynesian voyaging canoes Hōkūleʻa and Hawaiʻiloa, and has written the first year-long course in traditional navigation offered at any university in the world. Since 1987, she has written another dozen courses in Hawaiian history, mythology and culture for the Center for Hawaiian Studies.

Currently, she is working on a book on Hawaiian sexuality as reflected in Hawaiian mythology, history, poetry and literature, wherein multiple partners, brother-sister mating, and bisexuality were considered a celebration of life.

== Recent activism ==
In 2005, when for the first time a Grammy was awarded for the separate category "Hawaiian Album of the Year", the winner was the producer of a slack-key guitar anthology, Seattle-born Charles Michael Brotman. Kameʻeleihiwa reportedly told a local television news reporter that the choice of Brotman was a case of "non-Hawaiians honoring a non-Hawaiian for packaging Hawaiian culture".

She also criticized the portrayal of Kamehameha the Great by a non-Hawaiian:

"I don't want bad relations between Samoans and Hawaiians, and I would like to ask Dwayne 'The Rock' Johnson to withdraw from doing this role. [Screenwriter] Greg Poirier contacted me about consulting on historical aspects of his script, and I agreed to meet. He paid me, but it was for a two-hour consultation. He's made a lot of headway with that consultation, using it as a stamp of approval. But I told him he is going to have challenges because King Kamehameha is a sacred chief and the intellectual property of the Hawaiian people, and that Hawaiians are outraged that a Samoan is going to play him. Polynesians are not all the same: Are the French and Russians the same? Greg was honest when we met. He said that after he writes the script it will go to the studio and they will do what they want, and he won't be surprised if they change it. I suggested that they may want to get elders from the Samoan community to ask descendants of Kamehameha for permission to tell this story and Greg's response was, 'What if they say no?' I don’t think Hollywood has the right to make this movie. Hawaiians should tell this story."

== Books ==
- Nā Wāhine Kapu (Sacred Hawaiian Women). Honolulu: ʻAi Pōhaku Press (1999). ISBN 1-883528-11-9
- He Moʻolelo Kaʻao o Kamapuaʻa: The Hawaiian Pig-God. Honolulu: Bishop Museum Press (1996). ISBN 0-930897-60-9
- Native Land and Foreign Desires: Pehea Lā E Pono Ai? How Shall We Live in Harmony?. Honolulu: Bishop Museum Press (1992). ISBN 0-930897-59-5
- Maui: The Mischief Maker. Honolulu: Bishop Museum Press (1991). ISBN 0-930897-53-6

== Essays ==
- Kaulana Oʻahu me he ʻĀina Momona Mamuli o Nā Haʻawina ʻAumākua (Famous in Oʻahu as a Land Fat with Food because of Ancestral Teachings) chapter in Food and Power in Hawai'i. University of Hawaii Press. (2016)
- Hawaiʻi-nui-akea Cousins: Ancestral Gods and Bodies of Knowledge are Treasures for the Descendants. Published in Te Kaharoa, the E-Journal on Pacific Indigenous Issues, Vol2, No.1, Auckland University of Technology (2009)

== Films ==
- Natives in New York, Seeking Justice at the United Nations. (2005)
- An Act of War: The Overthrow of the Hawaiian Nation. (1993)
