= Peter Kaʻeo =

Hawaiian noble and politician of the Kingdom of Hawaiʻi (1836–1880)

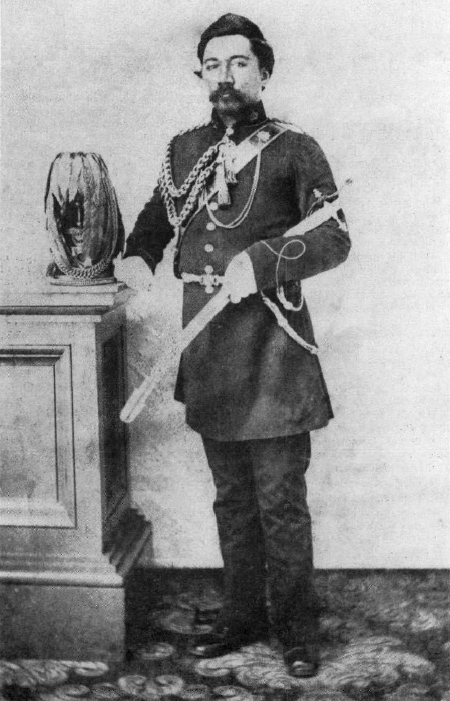
- Born: March 4, 1836; Honolulu, Oahu
- Died: November 26, 1880 (aged 44); Honolulu, Oahu
- Burial: November 28, 1880; Mauna ʻAla Royal Mausoleum
Names
- Peter Young Kaʻeo Kekuaokalani
- Father: Joshua Kaʻeo; John Kalaipaihala Young (hānai)
- Mother: Jane Lahilahi Young; Julia Alapai (hānai)

Peter Young Kaʻeo Kekuaokalani (March 4, 1836 – November 26, 1880) was a Hawaiian high chief (aliʻi) and politician of the Kingdom of Hawaii. His cousin was Emma, who contended for the throne after the death of Kamehameha. After being diagnosed with leprosy, he was exiled in 1873 to Kalaupapa, the isolation settlement on Molokaʻ. He was later permitted to return to Honolulu, where he died.

== Life ==
Peter was born March 4, 1836, at Paloha, Honolulu on the island of Oʻahu. His mother was Jane Lahilahi, the youngest daughter of John Young Olohana, the advisor to Kamehameha I, and Chiefess Kaʻōanaʻeha. His father was Joshua Kaʻeo, judge of the Supreme Court of Hawaii, and great-great-grandson or great-grandson of King Kalaniopuu.

He was adopted at birth by his maternal uncle John Kalaipaihala Young, according to Hawaiian tradition of hānai. His uncle was the fourth Kuhina Nui and the Minister of the Interior. Kaeo was declared eligible to succeed to the Hawaiian throne by Kamehameha III and attended Chiefs' Children's School because of his descent from Keliʻimaikaʻi, Kamehameha III's uncle. The school was run by Amos Starr Cooke and Juliette Montague Cooke, an American missionary couple.

Kaeo served as a member of the House of Nobles 1863–1880, and on the Privy Council of King Kamehameha IV 1863–1864. He contracted leprosy, now known as the Hansen's disease, which was incurable at the time. He was exiled to the leper colony at Kalaupapa on the island of Molokaʻi. He arrived June 29, 1873, traveling on the same boat as William P. Ragsdale, a part-Hawaiian attorney who had served as interpreter for the government and in the legislature. Kaeo had the means to maintain a comfortable life, including the work of two servants, but was aware of the poverty and desperation around him.

During his exile at Kalaupapa, he and his cousin Emma Kaleleonalani, at the time Queen Dowager, exchanged letters revealing their personal lives during this three-year period. In addition, these recount the affairs of the Hawaiian Kingdom during the same period of time, expressed in their own words and reflecting their status as Hawaiians. They commented on island politics, dynastic intrigues, inter-ethnic rivalries and animosities, American-Hawaiian diplomatic strains, and frustrations during a time of national crisis. They wrote 122 letters now held in Hawaiian historical archives.

For example, from Peter Kaeo to Queen Emma, August 11, 1873:

Deaths occur quite frequently here, almost dayly. Napela (the Mormon elder and assistant supervisor of the Kalaupapa Settlement) last week rode around the Beach to inspect the Lepers and came on to one that had no Pai [taro] for a Week but manage to live on what he could find in his Hut, anything Chewable. His legs were so bad that he cannot walk, and few traverse the spot where His Hut stands, but fortunate enough for him that he had sufficient enough water to last him till aid came and that not too late, or else probably he must have died.

On November 26, 1880, Kaeo died at Honolulu at the age 44, after being released from Kalawao in 1876. The Hawaiian Gazette, December 1, 1880, said: "The Hon. P. Y. Kaeo died at his residence on Emma Street on Friday night [November 26, 1880]. The funeral took place on Sunday and was largely attended by the retainers and friends of the family. The hearse was surrounded by Kahili-bearers as becomes the dignity of a chief."

He was interred in the Royal Mausoleum of Hawaii at Mauna ʻAla, along with many of the Young family members. His remains were moved along with political advisor Robert Crichton Wyllie and other members of Queen Emma's family to the newly build Wyllie Tomb in June 1904.

== Family tree ==
John Young (Hawaii) family tree

Keliʻimaikaʻi (died 1809)	Kalikoʻokalani	Kalaipaihala
Kaʻōanāʻeha (died 1850)
Henry C. Lewis	Fanny Kekelaokalani (1806–1880)	George Naʻea (1797–1852)
Mary Paʻaʻāina (1833–1853)	James Augustus Griswold (1823–?)	Dr. T. C. B. Rooke (1806–1858)
House of Kamehameha
Queen Emma (1836–1885)	Kamehameha IV (1836–1885)	Kamehameha III (1813–1854)
Albert Kamehameha (1858–1862)	Kiwalaʻo (died 1851)

Robert Young	Grace
Davis Family
John Young (1742–1835)	Namokuelua (died 1804)
Robert (1796–1813?)	Haʻale	James Kānehoa (1797–1851)	Sarah Kaniaulono (1797–1867)
Jane Lahilahi	Nuʻuanu
Grace Kamaʻikuʻi (1808–1866)	Governor Cox Keʻeaumoku (1784–1824)
Samuel Nuʻuanu
Jane Lahilahi (1813–1862)	Joshua Kaʻeo (c. 1808–1858)	Keoni Ana (1810–1857)	Julia Alapaʻi (died 1849)
Albert Kūnuiākea (1851–1903)	Mary Lonokahikini (1851–1904)	Peter Kekuaokalani (1836–1880)	Keliʻimaikaʻi "Alebada" (died 1851)

Notes:
- Apple, Russel A. (1978). "Appendix A: Young Family Geneology". Pahukanilua: Homestead of John Young: Kawaihae, Kohala, Island of Hawaiʻi : Historical Data Section of the Historic Structure Report. Honolulu: National Park Office, Hawaii State Office. pp. 39–41. OCLC 4962701.
- "John Young's Family". The Daily Bulletin. Vol. XV, no. 51. Honolulu. March 2, 1891. p. 2.
- Kanahele, George S. (1999). Emma: Hawaii's Remarkable Queen. Honolulu: University of Hawaii Press. p. 5. ISBN 978-0-8248-2240-8. OCLC 40890919.
- McKinzie, Edith Kawelohea (1983). Stagner, Ishmael W. (ed.). Hawaiian Genealogies: Extracted from Hawaiian Language Newspapers. Vol. 1. Honolulu: University of Hawaii Press. pp. 38–39. ISBN 0-939154-28-5. OCLC 12555087.

== Bibliography ==
- Allen, Helena G. (1982). The Betrayal of Liliuokalani: Last Queen of Hawaii, 1838–1917. Glendale, CA: Arthur H. Clark Company. ISBN 978-0-87062-144-4. OCLC 9576325.
- Cooke, Amos Starr; Cooke, Juliette Montague (1937). Richards, Mary Atherton (ed.). The Chiefs' Children School: A Record Compiled from the Diary and Letters of Amos Starr Cooke and Juliette Montague Cooke, by Their Granddaughter Mary Atherton Richards. Honolulu: Honolulu Star-Bulletin. OCLC 1972890.
- Cracroft, Sophia; Franklin, Jane; Queen Emma (1958). Korn, Alfons L. (ed.). The Victorian Visitors: An Account of the Hawaiian Kingdom, 1861–1866, Including the Journal Letters of Sophia Cracroft: Extracts from the Journals of Lady Franklin, and Diaries and Letters of Queen Emma of Hawaii. Honolulu: University of Hawaii Press. hdl:10125/39981. ISBN 978-0-87022-421-8. OCLC 8989368.
- Dabagh, Jean; Lyons, Curtis Jere; Hitchcock, Harvey Rexford (1974). Dabagh, Jean (ed.). "A King is Elected: One Hundred Years Ago" (PDF). The Hawaiian Journal of History. 8. Honolulu: Hawaiian Historical Society: 76–89. hdl:10524/112. OCLC 60626541.
- Haley, James L. (2014). Captive Paradise: A History of Hawaii. New York: St. Martin's Press. ISBN 978-0-312-60065-5. OCLC 865158092.
- Hawaii (1918). Lydecker, Robert Colfax (ed.). Roster Legislatures of Hawaii, 1841–1918. Honolulu: Hawaiian Gazette Company. OCLC 60737418.
- Inglis, Kerri A. (2013). Ma'i Lepera: A History of Leprosy in Nineteenth-Century Hawai'i. Honolulu, HI: University of Hawaii Press. ISBN 978-0-8248-6579-5.
- Kaeo, Peter; Queen Emma (1976). Korn, Alfons L. (ed.). News from Molokai, Letters Between Peter Kaeo & Queen Emma, 1873–1876. Honolulu: The University Press of Hawaii. hdl:10125/39980. ISBN 978-0-8248-0399-5. OCLC 2225064.
- Kam, Ralph Thomas (2017). Death Rites and Hawaiian Royalty: Funerary Practices in the Kamehameha and Kalakaua Dynasties, 1819–1953. S. I.: McFarland, Incorporated, Publishers. ISBN 978-1-4766-6846-8. OCLC 966566652.
- Kamakau, Samuel (1992) [1961]. Ruling Chiefs of Hawaii (Revised ed.). Honolulu: Kamehameha Schools Press. ISBN 0-87336-014-1. OCLC 25008795.
- Kanahele, George S. (1999). Emma: Hawaii's Remarkable Queen. Honolulu: University of Hawaii Press. ISBN 978-0-8248-2240-8. OCLC 40890919.
- Kuykendall, Ralph Simpson (1953). The Hawaiian Kingdom, 1854–1874, Twenty Critical Years. Vol. 2. Honolulu: University of Hawaii Press. ISBN 978-0-87022-432-4.
- Kuykendall, Ralph Simpson (1967). The Hawaiian Kingdom 1874–1893, The Kalakaua Dynasty. Vol. 3. Honolulu: University of Hawaii Press. ISBN 978-0-87022-433-1. OCLC 500374815.
- Law, Anwei Skinsnes (2012). Kalaupapa: A Collective Memory (Ka Hokuwelowelo). Honolulu: University of Hawaii Press. ISBN 978-0-8248-6580-1. OCLC 830023588.
- Liliuokalani (1898). Hawaii's Story by Hawaii's Queen, Liliuokalani. Boston: Lee and Shepard. ISBN 978-0-548-22265-2. OCLC 2387226.
- McKinzie, Edith Kawelohea (1983). Stagner, Ishmael W. (ed.). Hawaiian Genealogies: Extracted from Hawaiian Language Newspapers. Vol. 1. Honolulu: University of Hawaii Press. ISBN 0-939154-28-5. OCLC 12555087.
- McKinzie, Edith Kawelohea (1986). Stagner, Ishmael W. (ed.). Hawaiian Genealogies: Extracted from Hawaiian Language Newspapers. Vol. 2. Honolulu: University of Hawaii Press. ISBN 978-0-939154-37-1. OCLC 12555087.
- Moblo, Pennie (June 1999). "Ethnic Intercession: Leadership at the Kalaupapa Leprosy Colony". Pacific Studies. 22 (2). Laie, HI: Brigham Young University: 27–69. OCLC 882697672. Archived from the original on September 23, 2016.
- Parker, David "Kawika" (2008). "Crypts of the Ali`i The Last Refuge of the Hawaiian Royalty". Tales of Our Hawaiʻi (PDF). Honolulu: Alu Like, Inc. OCLC 309392477. Archived from the original (PDF) on November 11, 2013.
- Pratt, Elizabeth Kekaaniauokalani Kalaninuiohilaukapu (1920). History of Keoua Kalanikupuapa-i-nui: Father of Hawaii Kings, and His Descendants, with Notes on Kamehameha I, First King of All Hawaii. Honolulu: Honolulu Star-Bulletin. OCLC 154181545.
- Rossi, Pualiʻiliʻimaikalani (December 2013). No Ka Pono ʻOle O Ka Lehulehu: The 1874 Election of Hawaiʻi's Moʻi And The Kanaka Maoli Response (PDF) (Thesis). Honolulu: University of Hawaii at Manoa. hdl:10125/100744.
- Tsai, Tiffany Ing (2016). "The 1873 Election in Hawaiʻi between Prince William Charles Lunalilo and the Other Candidate". The Hawaiian Journal of History. 50 (50). Honolulu: Hawaiian Historical Society: 53–73. doi:10.1353/hjh.2016.0002. hdl:10524/59459. OCLC 60626541. S2CID 164663327 – via Project MUSE.
