= Hānai =

Hawaiian term for informal adoption

Hānai is a term in Hawaiian culture referring to the informal transfer or adoption of a child by another person or family. The word literally means feeding, linking nurture to kinship obligations. It appears as a noun, adjective, and verb in Hawaiian usage.

== Etymology and linguistics ==
The Hawaiian verb hānai means to feed, nourish, sustain, or foster. The root ʻai denotes food or eating, while a causative formation yields the sense to cause to eat, to feed. In descriptive and verbal uses, hānai covers adopted or fostered persons and the act of adopting or fostering. Traditional sayings tie feeding to sustaining social bonds. Hānai children were fully recognized within foster families, with everyday speech often not distinguishing between biological and hānai kin.

== Traditional practice ==
In pre-contact Hawaiʻi, hānai often took place soon after birth, when parents entrusted an infant to another couple to raise. The practice reinforced kin ties and enabled the transmission of knowledge and resources across generations. Paternal grandparents often claimed the first-born male grandchild, and maternal grandparents the first-born female grandchild.

== Political and royal use ==
Hānai also functioned as a political strategy among the aliʻi to link chiefly families. Liliʻuokalani, Hawaiʻi’s last reigning monarch, described hānai as natural and as an alliance by adoption that cemented ties among chiefs and fostered harmony among the people.

== Related practices ==
Hawaiians also practiced hoʻokama, the adoption of older children and adults, used to secure succession, labor, or care in old age.

== Genealogy and continuity ==
Because children were often raised outside their birth families, hānai complicates genealogical research in Hawaiʻi when records did not note informal transfers. Scholars have discussed the practice in relation to Hawaiian identity in modern contexts.

== Wider Polynesian and comparative parallels ==
Comparable customs occur across Polynesia. In Tahiti the practice is known as faʻaʻamu. In Māori society the practice known as whāngai aligns caregiving with kinship obligations. In Japan, adult adoption, including mukoyōshi adopted sons-in-law, has long served to preserve family lines.

== See also ==
- Category:Hawaiian adoptees (hānai)
