= Haʻalelea =

High chief of the Hawaiian Kingdom (1822–1864)

Levi Haʻalelea
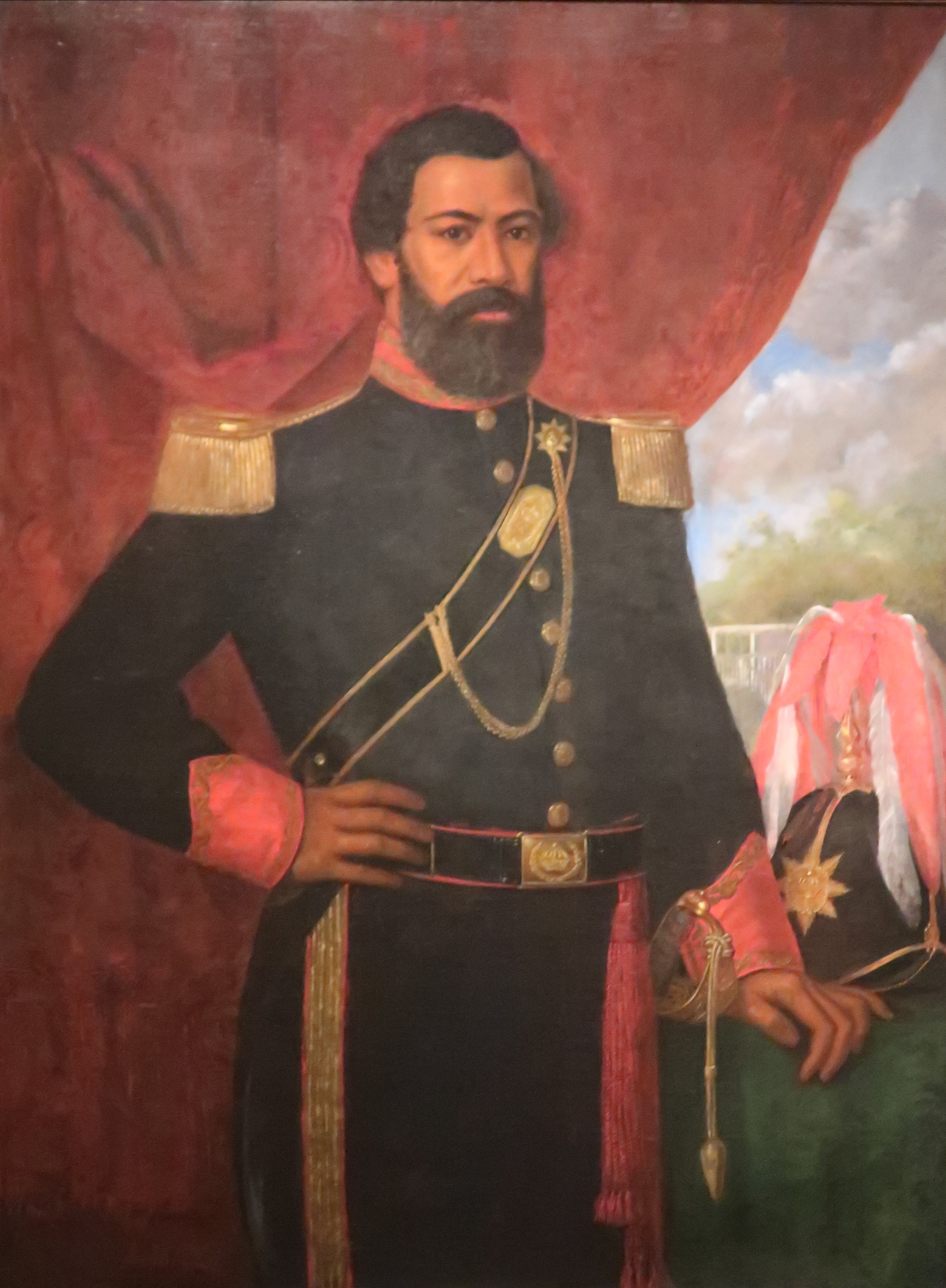
- Portrait by Enoch Wood Perry Jr.

Member of the House of Nobles
- In office 1853–1862

Member of the Privy Council of State
- In office April 26, 1852 – July 18, 1855

Personal details
- Born: c. 1822 Lahaina, Maui, Hawaiian Kingdom
- Died: October 3, 1864 (aged 41–42) Holani Pa, Honolulu, Oahu, Hawaiian Kingdom
- Resting place: Kawaiahaʻo Cemetery
- Spouse(s): Kekauʻōnohi; Amoe Ululani Ena
- Children: Julia Kamalalehua
- Parent(s): Haʻaloʻu and Kipa
- Education: Lahainaluna School
- Occupation: Politician

Levi Haʻalelea (c. 1822 – October 3, 1864) was a high chief and member of the Hawaiian nobility during the Hawaiian Kingdom. He initially served as a kahu (royal caretaker) and konohiki (land agent) for High Chief Leleiohoku, one of the grandsons of Kamehameha I. He later became abHulumanu (court favorite) in the royal court of Kamehameha III and eventually served as Chamberlain for the court. He married Kekauʻōnohi, the granddaughter of Kamehameha I. These connections to the ruling dynasty gave him access to vast landholding during the land division of the Great Mahele in 1848. Active in politics, he was a member of the Privy Council of State and served in the House of Nobles. In later life, he helped the early Mormon missionaries to the islands by leasing them land and eventually converted to that faith.

== Early life and family ==
Born circa 1822 in Lahaina, Maui, his father was Haʻaloʻu, the Governor of the island of Molokai under Prime Minister Kalanimoku, and his mother was Kipa. His maternal half-brother was Timoteo Haʻalilio, secretary of Kamehameha III and envoy of the Hawaiian Kingdom who led a diplomatic mission to Europe and the United States for international recognition of Hawaii's sovereignty. In the Hawaiian language, his name Haʻalelea meant man sacrificed when cutting an ʻōhiʻa tree for an image.

Haʻalelea became a kahu (caretaker) and cared for High Chief Leleiohoku along with his maternal uncle Malo. Leleiohoku was the son of Kalanimoku and a grandson of Kamehameha I. He would also serve as Leleiohoku's konohiki or chief of land (land agent). In 1834, he and Leleiohoku attend Lahainaluna Seminary, a school ran by the American missionaries who arrived in Hawaii in 1820. Some of his classmates included writer S. N. Haleole, historian Samuel Kamakau and future royal governor George Luther Kapeau. He became a Hulumanu (court favorite) in the royal court of Kamehameha III in the 1830s. In 1837, the members of the Hulumanu divided the king's land on the island of Molokai between themselves and Haʻalelea received lands at Ohia and half the ahupuaʻa of Kamananoni.

== Chiefly status and marriages ==
Haʻalelea also served as the private secretary and land agent of Kealiʻiahonui, the son of the last independent king of Kauaʻi Kaumualiʻi, and his wife Kekauʻōnohi, the granddaughter of Kamehameha I and former wife of Kamehameha II, until the former's death in 1849. Around November 1849 (Haʻalelea himself dates this to 1850), he married Kealiʻiahonui's widow Kekauʻōnohi. This marriage elevated him to the status of chief but produced no children before Kekauʻōnohi's death in 1851. The Great Mahele of 1848 reaffirmed him in his personal landholdings at Kamananoni, Molokai. After his marriage, he received additional land from Kekauʻōnohi and became the largest landowner on Molokai. His landholdings on Molokai included the ahupuaʻa of Makanalua, Naiwa in Kalaʻe, the adjoining kona ahupuaʻa of Kapulei, Kumueli, and Wawaia, the ahupuaʻa of Moakea on the far east end of the island and forty-one acres in Pelekunu Valley. He also held lands on Oahu, Maui, Lanai and the island of Hawaii.

His only child was a daughter named Julia Kamalalehua or Kamalelehua (1839–1856). She died on February 8, 1856, at her father's residence, of brain congestion, at the age of sixteen and six months.

On January 21, 1858, he married his second wife Anaderia Amoe Ululani Kapukalakala Ena (1842–1904) at the age of 16. She was the eldest daughter of the chiefess Kaikilanialiiwahineopuna and John Ena (Zane Shang Hsien) of Hilo, a merchant of Chinese descent.

== Political career ==
Haʻalelea was a member of the Privy Council of State from 1852 to 1855 and served in the House of Nobles from 1853 to 1862. He would also serve as Chamberlain of the Royal Court.

Haʻalelea was a staff officer in the retinue of Kamehameha III and later Prince Lot (the future Kamehameha V. In the fall of 1860, Haʻalelea accompanied Prince Lot, a young David Kalākaua and Hawaii's Consul for Peru, Josiah C. Spalding, on a two-month tour of British Columbia and California. They sailed from Honolulu aboard the yacht Emma Rooke, on August 29, arriving on September 18 in Victoria, British Columbia where they were received by the local dignitaries of the city. In California, the party visited San Francisco, Sacramento, Folsom and other local areas where they were honorably received.

== Mormon missionaries ==
In 1854, Haʻalelea leased his land in the Pālāwai Valley on the island of Lanai to the early Mormon missionaries who set up a Mormon colony on the island for a period of time. This land was however considered useless, so Haʻalelea may have used it as a chance to get rid of an unwanted piece of property. He would eventually convert to the Church of Jesus Christ of Latter-day Saints. In 1863, he sold the entire ahupuaʻa to Walter Murray Gibson.

== Death and legacy ==
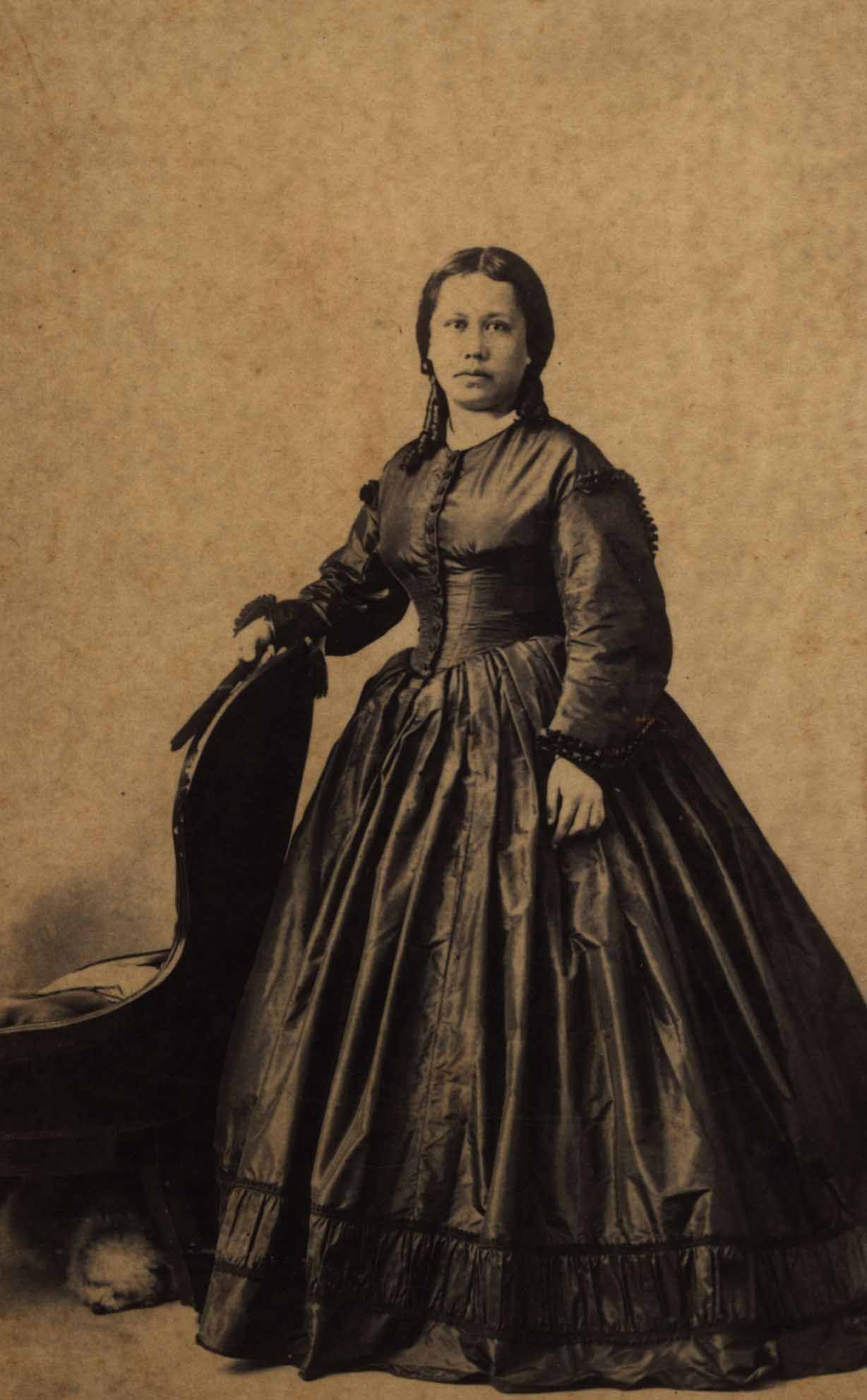
Amoe Ululani Kapukalakala Ena Haʻalelea

Haʻalelea died on October 3, 1864, of aneurism at Holani Pa, his residence on Richards Street in Honolulu. The two-story coral-house was originally built by Kealiʻiahonui and adjoined with Haimoeipo, the private residence of Queen Kalama, a relative of Haʻalelea. In his lifetime, he befriended American conchologist William Harper Pease who kept his shell collections in Haʻalelea's home. After his death, it became known as Haʻalelea Lawn, but the house was later torn down and the land used by the University Club.

In 1907, a marble memorial tablet at Kawaiahaʻo Church was erected honoring Haʻalilio, Haʻalelea, and his second wife Amoe Ululani, who was a great benefactor of the church. The plaque and another plaque commemorating Ululani's sister Laura Kekuakapuokalani Coney hang above the mauka (mountainward) royal pew at Kawaiahaʻo. His brother's Christian name was written as Richard instead of Timothy and Haʻalelea's birth year was inscribed as 1828 instead of 1822. The tablet reads: "In Memory of Levi Haalelea 1828-1864 His wife Ululani A. A. Haalelea 1824-1904 and Richard Haalilio 1808—1844." A similarly inscribed stone grave marker for Ululani, Haʻalilio and Haʻalelea was erected at the Kawaiahaʻo Cemetery in an enclosure, makai (seaward) of the Lunalilo Mausoleum.

An oil portrait of Haʻalelea (above) by Enoch Wood Perry Jr. once hanged at ʻIolani Palace in the 1920s. It is now in the collections of the Hawaii State Archives.

He was a related by blood to both Queen Kalama and her uncle, Charles Kanaʻina. After his death the two would approve administration of his Last Will and Testament as the devisees under the Will.

== Family tree ==
Keakealanikane	Kaleiheana
Moanakane	Piʻilaniwahine
Kapuni-a-Moana	Lono-a-Moana	Kauhi-a-Haki	Iliki-a-Moana
Manua a.k.a. Uaua	Moanawahine
Kuaina (Haaleleaina)	Ahumaikealake
Malo	Haʻaloʻu (k)	Koeleele (k)	Kipa (w)
Levi Haʻalelea	Timoteo Haʻalilio

== Bibliography ==
Books and journals

- Adler, Jacob; Kamins, Robert M. (1986). The Fantastic Life of Walter Murray Gibson: Hawaii's Minister of Everything. Honolulu: University of Hawaii Press. ISBN 978-0-8248-1015-3. OCLC 13126510.
- Alexander, William DeWitt (1907). "The Funeral Rites of Prince Kealiiahonui". Fourteenth Annual Report of the Hawaiian Historical Society for the Year 1906. Honolulu: Hawaiian Historical Society: 26–28. hdl:10524/87.
- Bailey, Paul (1980). Hawaii's Royal Prime Minister: The Life & Times of Walter Murray Gibson. New York: Hastings House. ISBN 978-0-8038-3058-5. OCLC 568708947.
- Barrere, Dorothy B. (1994). "HAALELEA, LIWAI (LEVI) LCA 5382" (PDF). The King's Mahele: The Awardees and Their Lands. pp. 22–24. OCLC 31886789. Archived (PDF) from the original on December 23, 2015.
- Baur, John E. (1922). "When Royalty Came To California". California Historical Society Quarterly. 67 (4). Honolulu: Hawaiian Historical Society: 244–264. doi:10.2307/25158494. JSTOR 25158494.
- Britsch, R. Lanier (1978). "Lanai Colony: A Hawaiian Extension of the Mormon". The Hawaiian Journal of History. 12. Honolulu: Hawaiian Historical Society: 68–83. hdl:10524/471. OCLC 60626541.
- Chang, Toy Len; Lum, Arlene; Luke, Terry K. W. (1988). Sailing for the Sun: The Chinese in Hawaii, 1789–1989. Honolulu: University of Hawaii Press. ISBN 978-0-8248-1313-0. OCLC 19270041.
- Forbes, David W., ed. (2001). Hawaiian National Bibliography, 1780–1900, Volume 3: 1851–1880. Vol. 3. Honolulu: University of Hawaii Press. ISBN 978-0-8248-2503-4. OCLC 123279964.
- Graham, Wade (2018). Braided Waters: Environment and Society in Molokai, Hawaii. Oakland: University of California Press. ISBN 978-0-520-29859-0. OCLC 1044572865.
- Iaukea, Curtis P. (1930). "Reminiscences of the Court of Kamehameha IV and Queen Emma" (PDF). Papers of the Hawaiian Historical Society (19). Honolulu: Hawaiian Historical Society: 17–27. hdl:10524/961.
- Johnson, Richard I. (1994). Types of Shelled Indo-Pacific Mollusks Described by William Harper Pease (1824–71). Vol. 154. Cambridge, Massachusetts: The Museum. OCLC 978170025.
- Kam, Ralph Thomas (2017). Death Rites and Hawaiian Royalty: Funerary Practices in the Kamehameha and Kalakaua Dynasties, 1819–1953. S. I.: McFarland, Incorporated, Publishers. pp. 51, 52, 58, 61, 64, 209–210, 215. ISBN 978-1-4766-6846-8. OCLC 966566652.
- Kam, Ralph Thomas (2022). Lost Palaces of Hawaiʻi Royal Residences of the Kingdom Period. S. I.: McFarland, Incorporated, Publishers. ISBN 9781476688114. OCLC 1264273188.
- Kamakau, Samuel (1992) [1961]. Ruling Chiefs of Hawaii (Revised ed.). Honolulu: Kamehameha Schools Press. ISBN 0-87336-014-1. OCLC 25008795.
- Kameʻeleihiwa, Lilikalā (1992). Native Land and Foreign Desires. Honolulu: Bishop Museum Press. ISBN 0-930897-59-5. OCLC 154146650.
- Kanahele, George S. (1999). Emma: Hawaii's Remarkable Queen. Honolulu: University of Hawaii Press. ISBN 978-0-8248-2240-8. OCLC 40890919.
- Liliuokalani (1898). Hawaii's Story by Hawaii's Queen, Liliuokalani. Boston: Lee and Shepard. ISBN 978-0-548-22265-2. OCLC 2387226.
- Pratt, Elizabeth Kekaaniauokalani Kalaninuiohilaukapu (1920). History of Keoua Kalanikupuapa-i-nui: Father of Hawaii Kings, and His Descendants, with Notes on Kamehameha I, First King of All Hawaii. Honolulu: Honolulu Star-Bulletin. OCLC 154181545.
- Pukui, Mary Kawena; Elbert, Samuel H. (1986). Hawaiian Dictionary: Hawaiian-English, English-Hawaiian. Honolulu: University of Hawaii Press. ISBN 978-0-8248-0703-0. OCLC 12751521.
- Taylor, Albert Pierce (1927). The Rulers of Hawaii, the Chiefs and Chiefesses, Their Palaces, Monuments, Portraits and Tombs. Honolulu: Printed by Advertiser Publishing Company. OCLC 583264723 – via Internet Archive.
- Taylor, Albert Pierce (1922). Under Hawaiian Skies: A Narrative of the Romance, Adventure and History of the Hawaiian Islands. Honolulu: Advertiser Publishing Company, Ltd. OCLC 479709.
- Williams, Rianna M. (2004). "Hawaiian Aliʻi Women in New York Society: the Ena-Coney-Vos-Gould Connection". The Hawaiian Journal of History. 38. Honolulu: Hawaiian Historical Society: 147–164. hdl:10524/447. OCLC 60626541.
- Wilson, Henry P. (November 1911). Ford, Alexander Hume (ed.). "Tapa: The Cloth of the South Seas". The Mid-Pacific Magazine. 2 (5). T. H., A. H. Ford; Pan-Pacific Union, Pan-Pacific Research Institution: 451–455.

Newspapers and online sources

- "Another Chief Dead". The Pacific Commercial Advertiser. Honolulu. October 8, 1864. p. 2.
- Armstrong, Samuel C. (August 19, 1856). "Died" (PDF). The Friend. New Series. Vol. V, no. 8. Honolulu: Samuel C. Damon. p. 64.
- "Haalelea, Levi office record". state archives digital collections. state of Hawaii. Archived from the original on March 3, 2016.
- "H. R. H. Prince L. Kamehameha at Victoria, Vancouver's Island". The Polynesian. Honolulu. November 3, 1860. p. 2. OCLC 8807758. Archived from the original on August 24, 2018.
- "In Society". The Pacific Commercial Advertiser. Honolulu. May 1, 1904. p. 6.
- "Ke Kii o Haalelea". Ka Nupepa Kuokoa. Vol. 3, no. 52. Honolulu. December 24, 1864. p. 2.
- "A Memorial Tablet in Kawaiahao Church". The Hawaiian Gazette. Honolulu. October 8, 1907. p. 5.
- "Papa Inoa O Ke Kula Nui O Lahainaluna". Ka Hae Hawaii. Vol. 3, no. 7. Honolulu. May 19, 1858. p. 26.
- "Tablets to Alii Kawaiahoans". The Hawaiian Gazette. Honolulu. October 15, 1907. p. 6.
- "Ua hoolululuuia mai makou..." Ka Nupepa Kuokoa. Vol. 3, no. 41. Honolulu. October 8, 1864. p. 2.
