= Joshua Kekaulahao =

Hawaiian judge & politician (c.1824–1856)

Member of the Kingdom of Hawaii House of Representatives
- In office 1851–1852

Member of the Kingdom of Hawaii House of Nobles
- In office 1853–1855

Personal details
- Born: c. 1824 Honolulu?, Kingdom of Hawaii
- Died: May 7, 1856 (aged 32) Honolulu
- Resting place: Kawaiahaʻo Church
- Spouse: Puakele?
- Parent: A. Kaina
- Relatives: John Kalili (cousin)
- Education: Lahainaluna Seminary
- Occupation: Lawyer, Judge, Politician
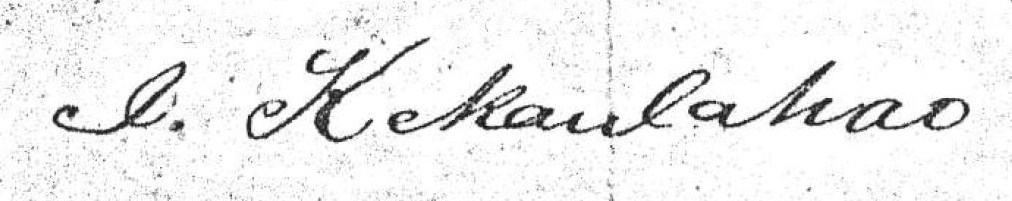
- Signature

Joshua Kekaulahao (c. 1824 – May 7, 1856) was a politician and judge in the Kingdom of Hawaii. His name is often spelled Kekaulahau.

== Biography ==
Born around 1824, Kekaulahao was the son of A. Kaina, who was a captain of the interisland steamer Akamai. A sister of his married Jonah Kapena. Kekaulahao also had a son who died in the smallpox epidemic of 1853. A vaccination administered by a Honolulu physician failed to save the child, and he died at Lahaina after bathing in the sea to alleviate the malignant case of smallpox. The 1853 epidemic resulted in about and 2,485 reported deaths but the death toll was probably as high as five or six thousand, about eight percent of the islands' population. The Hawaiian government made smallpox vaccination compulsory in 1854.

Kekaulahao was one of the first generation of Hawaiians to receive a western education by the American missionaries who arrived in Hawaii in 1820. In 1836, he began his education at Lahainaluna Seminary and graduated in 1841. Some of his classmates included writer S. N. Haleole, historian Samuel Kamakau and future royal governor George Luther Kapeau. After graduating from Lahainaluna, Kekaulahao became a practicing attorney in the early days of the kingdom. He entered the service of the Hawaiian government as a clerk for the House of Nobles in the 1846 session of the Hawaiian legislature. Throughout much of the early 1850s, he led an active career in the politics of the kingdom. In 1851, he was elected as a member of the House of Representatives, the lower house of the legislature, representing the district of ʻEwa, Oʻahu. Kekaulahao would serve as a representative from 1851 to 1852. On April 14, 1853, he was elevated to the position of a member of the House of Nobles, the upper house of the legislature traditionally reserved for the chiefs, serving until 1855. Initially serving as a secretary on the Board of Land Commissioners, he succeeded Zorobabela Kaʻauwai as one of the commissioners on the board after Kaʻauwai's resignation. The board was in charge of settling or quieting land claims of the Great Māhele. He served on the board from 1850 to 1855. On April 24, 1855, Kekaulahao was appointed Circuit Judge for Oʻahu succeeding his cousin John Kalili, who died in office.

Kekaulahao died on May 7, 1856, in Honolulu at the age of thirty-two. Two years later in 1858, he and five members of his family including his younger brother, father, son, sister, and cousin John Kalili were buried in the cemetery of the Kawaiahaʻo Church in a ceremony which included the use of Niihau mats as burial goods.

== Bibliography ==
- Hawaii (1918). Lydecker, Robert Colfax (ed.). Roster Legislatures of Hawaii, 1841-1918. Honolulu: Hawaiian Gazette Company.
- Hawaii. Dept. of the Interior (1853). Report of the Minister of the Interior. Honolulu: Polynesian Press.
- Greer, Richard A. (1965). "Oahu's Ordeal – The Smallpox Epidemic of 1853, Part 1". Hawaii Historical Review. 1 (12). Honolulu: Hawaiian Historical Society: 221–242. hdl:10524/12083.
- Kohn, George C. (2008). Encyclopedia of Plague and Pestilence: From Ancient Times to the Present. New York City: Infobase Publishing. ISBN 978-1-4381-2923-5.
- Kuykendall, Ralph Simpson (1965) [1938]. The Hawaiian Kingdom 1778–1854, Foundation and Transformation. Vol. 1. Honolulu: University of Hawaii Press. ISBN 0-87022-431-X.
- Osorio, Jon Kamakawiwoʻole (2002). Dismembering Lāhui: A History of the Hawaiian Nation to 1887. Honolulu: University of Hawaii Press. ISBN 978-0-8248-2549-2.
- Van Dyke, Jon M. (2008). Who Owns the Crown Lands of Hawaiʻi?. Honolulu: University of Hawaii Press. ISBN 978-0-8248-3211-7.
