= Jonah Kapena =

Hawaiian judge (died 1868)

Assistant Judge of the Supreme Court of Hawaii
- In office May 10, 1842 – 1848

Member of the Kingdom of Hawaii House of Nobles
- In office 1845, 1850–1866

Personal details
- Died: March 12, 1868 Honolulu, Hawaii
- Resting place: Kawaiahaʻo Church
- Spouse: Kahilipulu
- Children: John Mākini Kapena (hānai)
- Education: Lahainaluna Seminary
- Occupation: Royal Secretary, Judge, Civil Servant, Editor
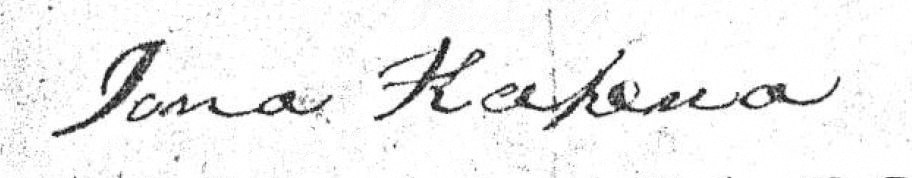
- Signature

Jonah Kapena (died March 12, 1868), also spelled Iona Kapena, was a royal advisor and statesman in the Kingdom of Hawaii who helped draft the 1840 Constitution of the Kingdom of Hawaii. In addition to his legislative career as a member of the House of Nobles, he also served as a judge and became an assistant judge of Hawaii's first Supreme Court.

== Early life ==
Nothing is known of Kapena's early life except that he was born into a family from the lesser strata of Hawaiian nobility, subordinate to the high chiefs or aliʻi nui. In 1831, he became a member of the first class of the Lahainaluna Seminary under American missionary Lorrin Andrews, the school's first principal. His classmates included historian David Malo and Samuel Kamakau and politicians Boaz Mahune and Timothy Haʻalilio. He graduated in 1835 after four years in the school.

== Political career ==
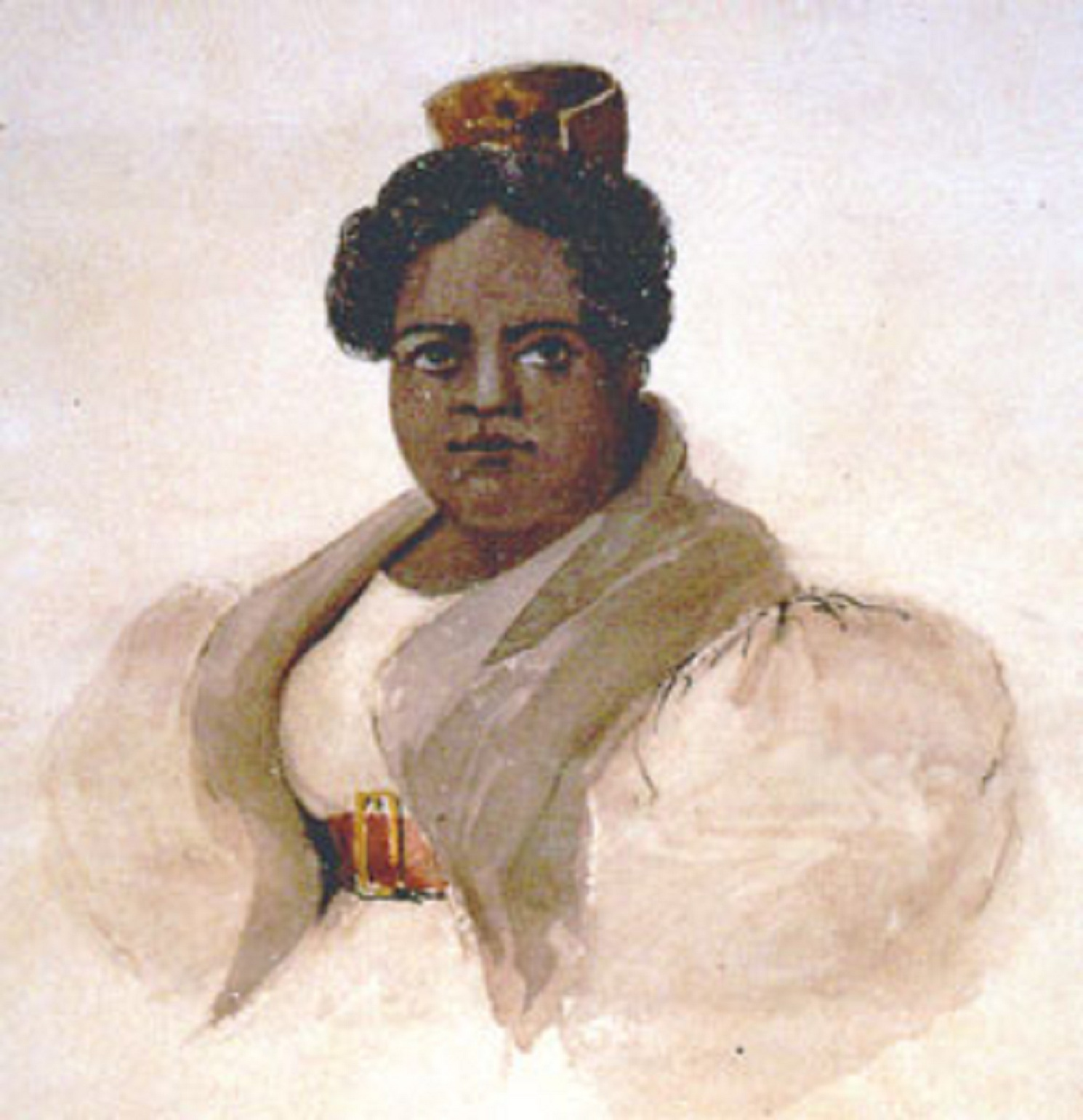
Kapena became the secretary and advisor of Kīnaʻu, the Kuhina Nui, and represented her in the drafting of Hawaii's first constitution.

Many graduates of Lahainaluna became politicians or advisors in the court of King Kamehameha III. Kapena became the secretary and advisor to Kīnaʻu, the Kuhina Nui (an office similar to that of a prime minister or co-regent), and represented her in the drafting of Hawaii's first constitution and declaration of rights. In an effort to establish a stable government against colonial ambitions, King Kamehameha III, the Kuhina Nui and the council of chiefs sought to make Hawaii a constitutional monarchy. Kapena and Boaz Mahune (representing the King) assisted American missionary William Richards in the endeavor of drafting this document. Mahune and the graduates at Lahainaluna were chiefly credited with drafting the Declaration of Rights of 1839 in the contemporary newspaper The Polynesian. However, research by Hawaiian historian Jon Kamakawiwoʻole Osorio credits Richards as the actual author of the Declaration and the majority of the later 1840 Constitution while Mahune and Kapena were only assistants. The 1840 constitution codified the existing political structure of the kingdom and created the Hawaiian Supreme Court and the Legislature of Hawaii.

Kapena worked as a governmental clerk during the 1841 session of the Legislature Assembly at Lahaina, the capital at the time. This session was the first time that the King and his nobles had met as a governing body since the ratification of the Constitution in 1840. He served as a clerk to the legislature again in 1843 with George Luther Kapeau, and then with William Richards during the 1845 session. In 1842, Kapena was elected by the legislature to serve as one of the four Assistant Judges of the Supreme Court of Hawaii. This court was the first formed in the Kingdom of Hawaii between 1842 and 1848, and was headed by King Kamehameha III and Kuhina Nui Kekāuluohi, and by Keoni Ana after Kekāuluohi's death. The four judges appointed in 1842 were not Associate Justices (like individuals appointed after 1848) but served the same capacity as assistant to the Chief Justice, i.e. the King. Kapena sat as a judge from 1842 to 1848, when the body was reformed under Chief Justice William Little Lee. In 1845, Kapena was also appointed an official member of the House of Nobles. In order to replace the diminishing number of aliʻi nui, it was decided by the existing members of the House of Nobles on April 2, 1845 to vote into the council lower ranking chiefs who were "men of learning" and elevate their chiefly statuses. Kapena was among the first group of six lesser chiefs chosen. As a member of the House of Nobles, Kapena would go on to serve in multiple legislative sessions between 1850 and 1866. Kapena was also later appointed Circuit Judge for Oahu. His obituary said that in this office he "gave satisfaction to all." After the accession of King Kamehameha V in 1864, Kapena was also appointed as a member of the Privy Council of State, an advisory council for the monarch.

== Personal life ==
In addition to his political positions, Kapena worked as a newspaper editor. He wrote in one of the kingdom's first Hawaiian language newspapers, the Ka Nonanona (which ran from 1841 to 1845), and later became the editor of the, Ke Au Okoa (which ran from 1865 to 1873). In 1870, his hānai son John Mākini Kapena became its editor until it merged with Ka Nupepa Kuokoa, and became Ka Nupepa Kuokoa Me Ke Au Okoa I Huiia in 1873.

Kapena married Kahilipulu on September 2, 1846, in Honolulu, Oʻahu. Kapena was also married to a sister of Joshua Kekaulahao. She died before 1858. Kapena led the procession at the funeral of all six of her family members including her two brothers, nephew, cousin and father. It is not known if these two pieces of information refer to the same person. Nothing beyond that is known about Kapena's marital status. In the Hawaiian tradition of hānai (a form of informal adoption), he adopted his nephew John Mākini Kapena (1843–1887), the only son of Mākini and Nāʻawa, a relative of King Kalākaua. John Kapena went on to become an important government minister under the reign of Kalākaua in the 1870s. The younger Kapena also married Emma Aʻalailoa Malo (1846–1886), the only daughter of David Malo, the elder Kapena's Lahainaluna classmate.

== Death and burial ==
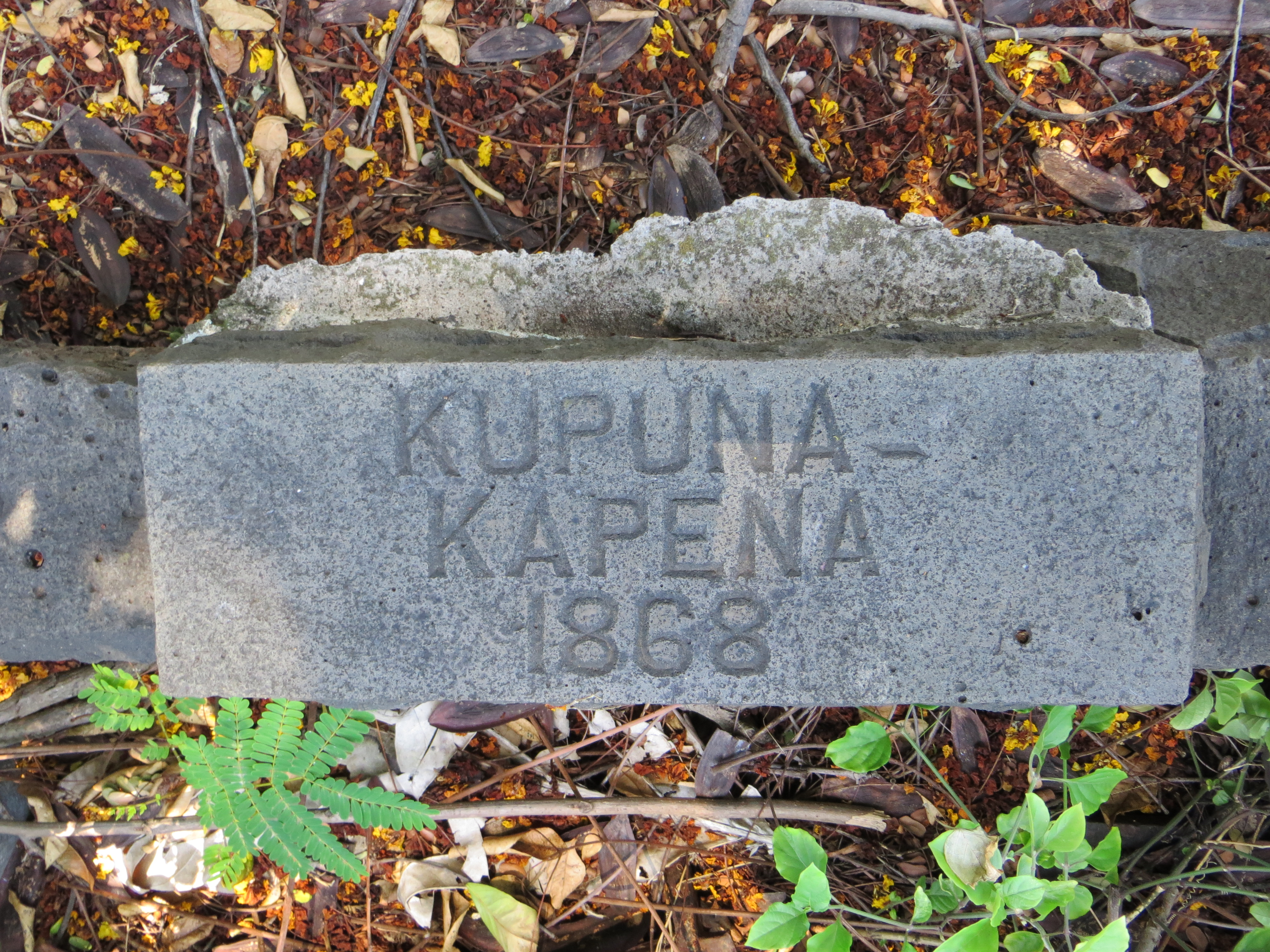
Grave marker for Kapena in the Kawaiahaʻo Cemetery

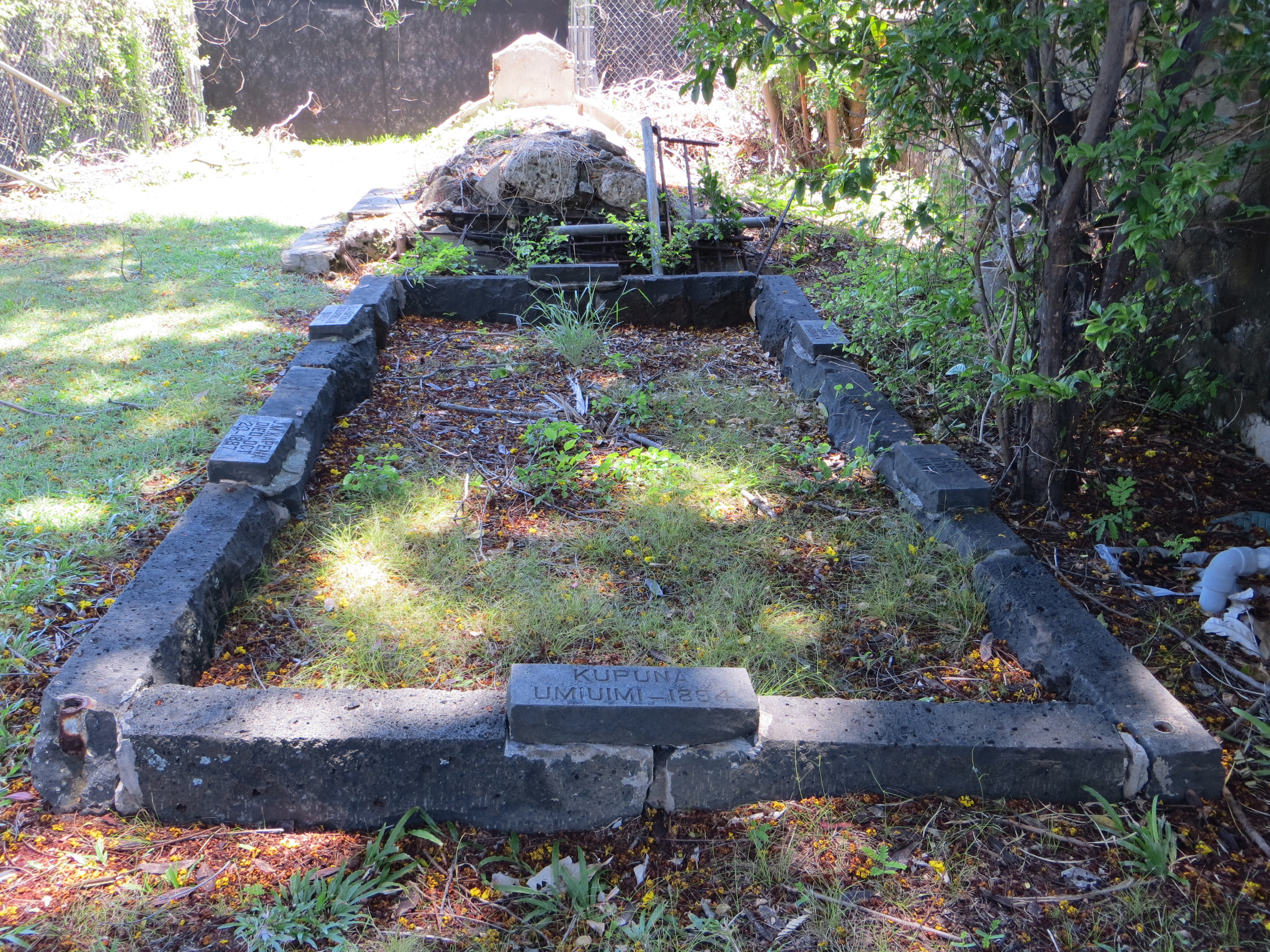
The Kapena family plot in the Kawaiahaʻo Cemetery

On March 12, 1868, Kapena died in Honolulu at his residence in the Nuuanu Valley. Kapena had become an invalid in the last years of his life which prevented him from performing any governmental duties. In 1868, the Hawaiian Gazette wrote of Kapena's legacy;

Judge Kapena, the last rites to whose memory, have just been performed, was a man whose character stood unblemished in this nation, and whose abilities, in the various positions of life, by him occupied, were conspicuous. In his official and social relation he was admired and beloved by the Hawaiian people. and his good name will be cherished not only by his family, but by a large circle of friends.

His funeral at Kawaiahaʻo Church was attended by friends, family, members of the Legislature, and the Chamberlain, who represented the King. The church was packed with mourners. The funeral service was conducted by Henry H. Parker, a reverend of Kawaiahaʻo Church, with assistance from George Washington Pilipō of Kaumakapili Church. Parker's discourse, which was in Hawaiian, gave a brief sketch of Kapena's life, and held him up as an example for his countrymen to follow. After the service, Kapena's coffin was placed in a newly constructed tomb or vault in the churchyard. His grave marker reads "Kupuna Kapena 1868." John Mākini Kapena and his wife Emma Aʻalailoa Malo Kapena were also buried in the Kapena family plot. Other relatives interred there include Umiuimi, David Kalu and Kahoihoi Pahu.

== Bibliography ==
- Bingham, Hiram (1855). A Residence of Twenty-one Years in the Sandwich Islands (Third ed.). Canandaigua, NY: H. D. Goodwin. OCLC 7294318.
- Frear, Walter F. (1894). "Evolution of the Hawaiian Judiciary". Papers of the Hawaiian Historical Society (7). Honolulu: Hawaiian Historical Society: 1–25. hdl:10524/966.
- Lydecker, Robert Colfax, ed. (1918). Roster Legislatures of Hawaii, 1841–1918. Honolulu: Hawaiian Gazette Company. OCLC 60737418.
- Hawaii (1842). Translation of the Constitution and Laws of the Hawaiian Islands, Established in the Reign of Kamelhameha III (reprint ed.). Washington, DC: Statute Law Book Company. OCLC 123237932.
- Hawaiian Historical Society (1943). "William Richards' Report to the Sandwich Islands Mission on His First Year In Government Service, 1838–1839". Fifty-First Annual Report of the Hawaiian Historical Society for the Year 1942. Honolulu: Hawaiian Historical Society: 65–70. hdl:10524/90. OCLC 2105039.
- Judd, Albert Francis (1888). Thrum, Thomas G. (ed.). "Early Constitution of the Judiciary of the Hawaiian Islands, Maile Wreath, February 1875, reprinted in". Hawaiian Almanac and Annual for 1889. Honolulu: Honolulu Star-Bulletin: 63–67. hdl:10524/655. OCLC 1663720.
- Kamakau, Samuel (1992) [1961]. Ruling Chiefs of Hawaii (Revised ed.). Honolulu: Kamehameha Schools Press. ISBN 0-87336-014-1. OCLC 25008795.
- Kuykendall, Ralph Simpson (1965) [1938]. The Hawaiian Kingdom 1778–1854, Foundation and Transformation. Vol. 1. Honolulu: University of Hawaii Press. ISBN 0-87022-431-X. OCLC 47008868.
- Mookini, Esther K. (1974). The Hawaiian Newspapers. Honolulu: Topgallant Publishing Company. OCLC 1009863.
- Osorio, Jon Kamakawiwoʻole (2002). Dismembering Lāhui: A History of the Hawaiian Nation to 1887. Honolulu: University of Hawaii Press. ISBN 0-8248-2549-7. OCLC 48579247.
- Silva, Noenoe; Badis, Iokepa (2008). "Early Hawaiian Newspapers and Kanaka Maoli Intellectual History, 1834–1855". The Hawaiian Journal of History. 42. Honolulu: Hawaiian Historical Society: 105–134. hdl:10524/402. OCLC 60626541.
- Spaulding, Thomas Marshall (1930). "Early Years of the Hawaiian Legislature". Thirty-Eighth Annual Report of the Hawaiian Historical Society for the Year 1929. Honolulu: Hawaiian Historical Society: 25–33. hdl:10524/33. OCLC 2105039.
