= Boaz Mahune =

Politician and civil servant of the Kingdom of Hawaii

- Died: March 1847; Honolulu, Hawaii
- Education: Lahainaluna Seminary
- Occupations: Teacher, Translator, Royal Secretary, Judge, Civil Servant
- Known for: drafting the Declaration of Rights of 1839.

Signature
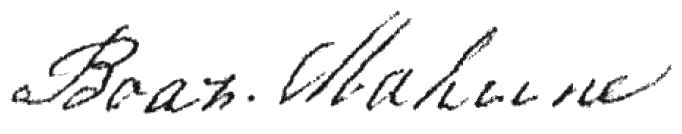

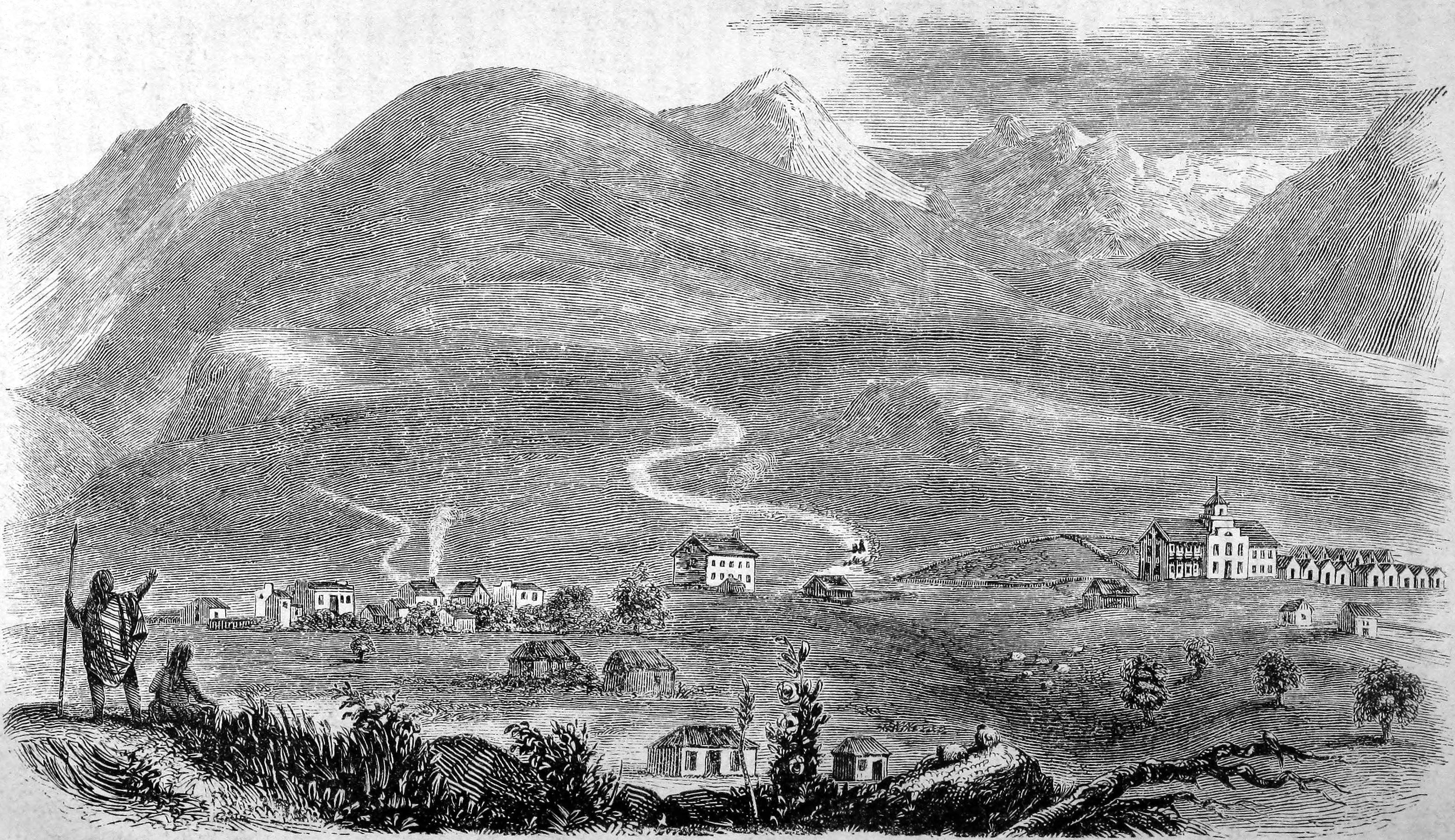
Lahainaluna Mission Seminary, c. 1840s.

Boaz Mahune (died 1847) was a 19th-century politician and civil servant of the Kingdom of Hawaii. He helped contribute to the writing of the 1840 Constitution of the Kingdom of Hawaii and was the author of its preamble the He Olelo Hoakaka, or the Declaration of Rights of 1839.

== Biography ==
Born in the early 1800s, Mahune was a member of the lesser strata of Hawaiian nobility, subordinate to the high chiefs or aliʻi. He was a cousin of Paul Kanoa, who served as Governor of Kauai from 1846 to 1877. He adopted the name "Boaz" from the Biblical figure after his conversion to Christianity. It was often spelled as Boas. He was a member of the first class of Lahainaluna Seminary under the school's first principal Lorrin Andrews. His classmates included historian David Malo, royal advisor Jonah Kapena, and royal diplomat Timothy Haʻalilio. Graduating in 1835, he was considered one of the most brilliant scholars in the school and was one of the ten chosen to remain as monitors, teachers in the children's school and assistants in translating.

Along with a few of his fellow graduates from Lahainaluna, he assisted King Kamehameha III and his chiefs in the writing of Hawaii's first constitution. Mahune became one of the secretaries and advisors to the King. He was responsible for writing the first draft of the Declaration of Rights of 1839, originally written in the Hawaiian language. After several round of changes by the king and his councilors, it was published June 7, 1839. Considered Hawaii's Magna Carta, it laid down the inalienable rights of the people, the principles of equality of between the makaʻāinana (commoner) and the aliʻi (chiefs) and the role of the government and law in the kingdom. Along with the Declaration of Rights, many of the laws codes within the constitution were of Mahune's authorship. Mahune wrote most of the laws concerning taxation. King Kamehameha III specifically directed him to conform them to the principles of political economy that he learned in Lahainaluna. The bulk of Mahune's work and ideas were influenced by his missionary education at Lahainaluna and the United States Declaration of Independence, although recently doubts have been cast upon the actual authorship of the Declaration and the majority of the Constitution. Hawaiian historian Jon Kamakawiwoʻole Osorio believe that it was American missionary William Richards, who was mainly responsible and that Mahune and Jonah Kapena, were only assistants to the creation of the Declaration of Rights.

Mahune served as the manager for the King's sugarcane plantation in Wailuku on Maui, which proved to be unsuccessful. Serving as a judge in Lahaina for a period of time, he returned to Honolulu in 1846, where he went back to working for the government as a civil servant. In March 1847, Mahune died after a distressing and painful illness of several months. He died without writing a will; his landholdings had been quite extensive including properties in each of the main islands showing his rank and favor in the royal court.

== Bibliography ==
- Benham, Maenette K. P.; Heck, Ronald H. (1998). Culture and Educational Policy in Hawaiʻi: The Silencing of Native Voices (2 ed.). Honolulu: Psychology Press. ISBN 0805827048.
- Hawaii (1842). Translation of the Constitution and Laws of the Hawaiian Islands, Established in the Reign of Kamehameha III (reprint ed.). Statute Law Book Co.
- Hawaiian Historical Society (1943). "Fifty-First Annual Report of the Hawaiian Historical Society for the Year 1942". Report of the Hawaiian Historical Society. Honolulu: Hawaiian Historical Society: 65–70. hdl:10524/90.
- Kamakau, Samuel (1992) [1961]. Ruling Chiefs of Hawaii (Revised ed.). Honolulu: Kamehameha Schools Press. ISBN 0-87336-014-1.
- Kuykendall, Ralph Simpson (1965) [1938]. The Hawaiian Kingdom 1778–1854, Foundation and Transformation. Vol. 1. Honolulu: University of Hawaii Press. ISBN 0-87022-431-X.
- Osorio, Jon Kamakawiwoʻole (2002). Dismembering Lāhui: A History of the Hawaiian Nation to 1887. Honolulu: University of Hawaii Press. ISBN 0-8248-2549-7.
