= John Kalili =

Hawaiian judge & politician (c.1814–1855)

Member of the Kingdom of Hawaii House of Representatives
- In office 1851–1852
- Monarch: Kamehameha III

Personal details
- Born: c. 1814
- Died: April 3, 1855 (aged 41) Honolulu, Hawaii
- Resting place: Kawaiahaʻo Church
- Relatives: Joshua Kekaulahao (cousin)
- Education: Lahainaluna Seminary
- Occupation: Judge, Politician

John Kalili (c. 1814 – April 3, 1855) was a judge and politician in the Kingdom of Hawaii.

== Life ==
Nothing much is known about Kalili's early life, although roster of the Lahainalunla School indicate he came from Honolulu, Oʻahu. He was a cousin of Joshua Kekaulahao. Kalili was one of the first generation of Hawaiians to receive a western education by the American missionaries who arrived in Hawaii in 1820. In 1836, he began his education at Lahainaluna Seminary with Kekaulahao and graduated after four years of education in 1840. Some of his classmates beside his cousin Kekaulahao included writer S. N. Haleole, historian Samuel Kamakau and future royal governor of Hawaii Island, George Luther Kapeau, although only Kekaulahao was in his same class of 1836. In 1847, he was registered as the owner of the Hawaiian sloop Waiahao.

On January 27, 1848, the Governor of Oʻahu Mataio Kekūanaōʻa appointed John Kalili and Simon P. Kalama as the two circuit judges of the island of Oʻahu. Kalama was charged with Honolulu while Kalili was charged with the district of Koʻolau in the eastern section of the island. Kalili would also serve as a legislator from 1851 to 1852 as a member of the House of Representatives, the lower house of the Hawaiian legislature. American lawyer Charles Coffin Harris ran as his opponent for the candiicay in the district of Palikolau in 1852 and lost. In the 1852 legislative session, John Kalili served as the chairman of the Committee on Election.

While still in office as judge, Kalili died in Honolulu on April 3, 1855, at the age of forty-one. His cousin Joshua Kekaulahao was appointed to replace him as the circuit judge of Oʻahu, although he himself would die in 1856. In 1858, the remains of Kalili, Joshua Kekaulahao and four members of Kekaulahao's family were buried in the cemetery of the Kawaiahaʻo Church in a ceremony which included the use of Niʻihau mats as burial goods.

== Bibliography ==
- Thayer, Wade Warren; Lydecker, Robert Colfax, eds. (1916). A Digest of the Decisions of the Supreme Court of Hawaii: Volumes 1 to 22 Inclusive, January 6, 1847, to October 7, 1915. Paradise of the Pacific Press.
- Hawaii (1918). Lydecker, Robert Colfax (ed.). Roster Legislatures of Hawaii, 1841-1918. Honolulu: Hawaiian Gazette Company.
- Osorio, Jon Kamakawiwoʻole (2002). Dismembering Lāhui: A History of the Hawaiian Nation to 1887. Honolulu: University of Hawaii Press. ISBN 0-8248-2549-7. OCLC 48579247.
