= Kalili =

Kalili may refer to:

- Akbar Kalili (1956–2018), Iranian alpine skier
- Hamana Kalili (1882–1958), Hawaiian fisherman who is popularly credited as being the originator of the Shaka sign
- John Kalili (c. 1813–1855), judge and politician in the Kingdom of Hawaii
- Maiola Kalili (1909–1972), Olympic swimmer and older brother of Manuella Kalili
- Manuella Kalili (1912–1969), Olympic swimmer and younger brother of Maiola Kalili
