= S. N. Haleʻole =

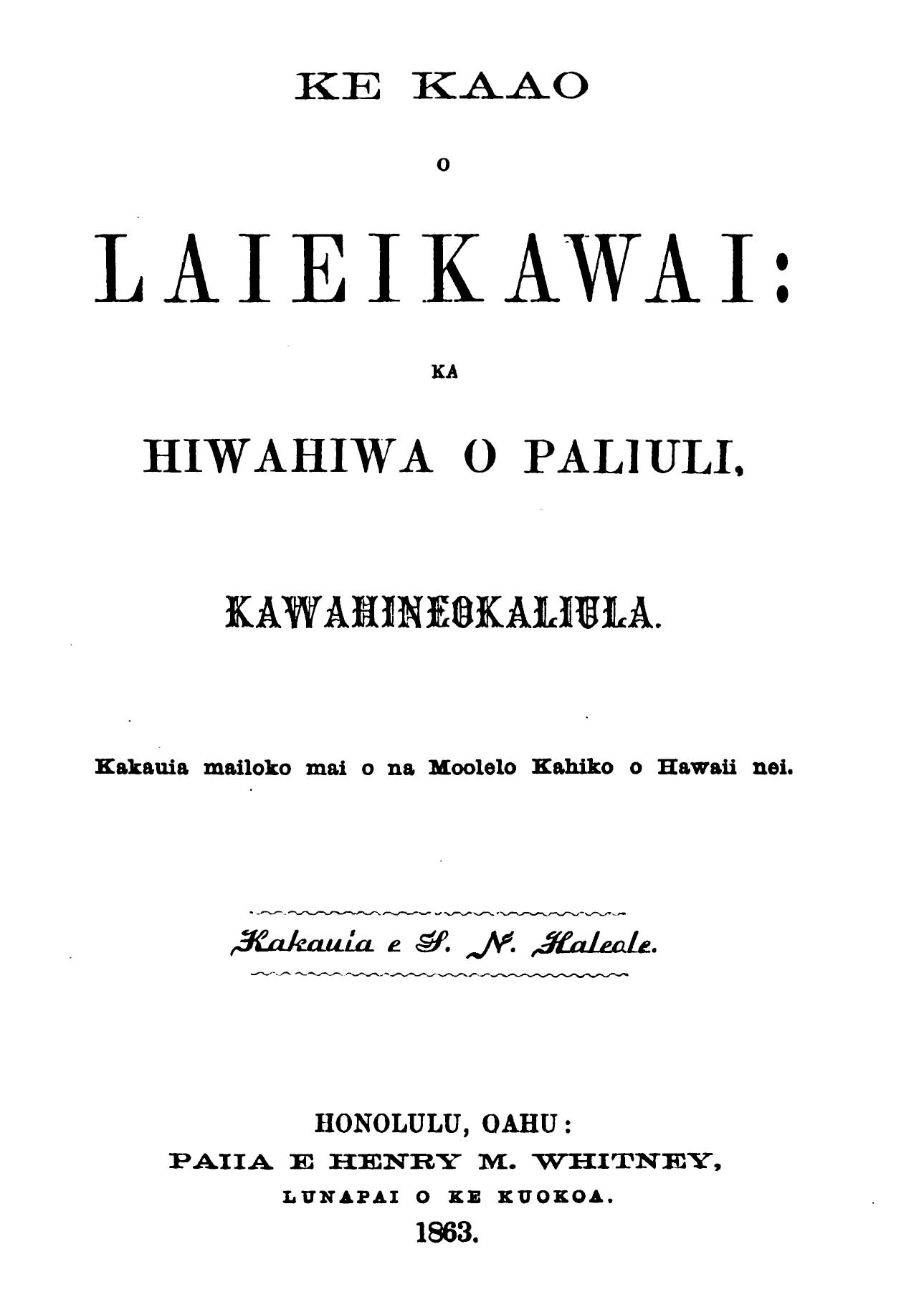
- Front page of Ke Kaao o Laieikawai (1863)
- Born: c. 1819; Kohala, Kingdom of Hawaii
- Died: October 22, 1866 ʻEwa, Oahu
- Education: Lahainaluna Seminary
- Occupations: Writer, historian, teacher

S. N. Haleʻole (c. 1819 – October 22, 1866) was a leading Native Hawaiian writer and historian of the Kingdom of Hawaii. He is noted for authoring The Hawaiian Romance of Laieikawai, the first fictional work of literature produced by a Native Hawaiian.

== Biography ==
Haleʻole was born around 1819 in Kohala during the time of King Kamehameha I's death and before the arrival of the American missionaries who arrived in Hawaii in 1820. He was one of the first generation of Hawaiians to receive a Western education by the American missionaries. In 1834, he began his education at Lahainaluna Seminary and graduated after four years in 1838. Taught by Lorrin Andrews and Sheldon Dibble, Haleʻole developed a strong interest in the ancient history of his people. Some of his classmates included early Hawaiian historians David Malo, John Papa ʻĪʻī and Samuel Kamakau.

After graduating from Lahainaluna, he became a teacher. According to the Lahainaluna rosters, he was working as a teacher in Haiku, Maui in the year 1858. He also later became an editor.

In the early 1860s, Haleʻole began writing Ke Kaao o Laieikawai (later translated as The Hawaiian Romance of Laieikawai), based on a traditional kaʻao about the princess Lāʻieikawai, a narrative rehearsed in prose and interspersed with songs handed down orally by ancient Hawaiian storytellers. It was first printed as a serial in the Hawaiian newspaper Ka Nupepa Kuokoa and later published in 1863 as a book. It was the first fictional work of literature produced by a Native Hawaiian. After his death, it was revised in 1885 and translated by Martha Warren Beckwith in 1918. Beckwith stated:

The romance of Laieikawai therefore remains the sole piece of Hawaiian imaginative writing to reach book form. Not only this, but it represents the single composition of a Polynesian mind working upon the material of an old legend and eager to create a genuine national literature. As such it claims a kind of classic interest.

Haleʻole also wrote extensively on Hawaiian culture and history. A member of the first Hawaiian Historical Society, a precursor to the modern institution, he was writing a history of the life of Kamehameha I before his death. Many of his works were later used by Kamakau.

== Death ==
On October 22, 1866, Haleʻole died suddenly at ʻEwa. An obituary in the Pacific Commercial Advertiser noted: "For a Hawaiian, he possessed rare literary talent, and the story of Laieikawai, one of the ancient Hawaiian princesses, will long remain a fit monument of his genius."

== Bibliography ==
- Charlot, John (2005). Classical Hawaiian Education: Generations of Hawaiian Culture (PDF). Laie, HI: Pacific Institute, Brigham Young University. ISBN 0-9391-5471-4. OCLC 64686034.
- Day, Arthur Grove (1984). History Makers of Hawaii: a Biographical Dictionary. Honolulu: Mutual Publishing of Honolulu. ISBN 978-0-935180-09-1. OCLC 11087565.
- Forbes, David W., ed. (2001). Hawaiian National Bibliography, 1780–1900, Volume 3: 1851–1880. Vol. 3. Honolulu: University of Hawaii Press. pp. 338–339. ISBN 978-0-8248-2503-4. OCLC 123279964.
- Haleole, S. N. (1918). The Hawaiian Romance of Laieikawai. Translated by Martha Warren Beckwith. Washington, D. C.: U.S. Government Printing Office. OCLC 148426481.
- Kupihea, Moke (2005). The Cry of the Huna: The Ancestral Voices of Hawaii. Rochester, VT: Inner Traditions. ISBN 978-1-59477-642-7. OCLC 794178958.
- Westervelt, W. D. (1913). "The First Hawaiian Historical Society". Twenty-First Annual Report of the Hawaiian Historical Society for the Year 1912. Honolulu: Hawaiian Historical Society: 8–11.
