= Sheldon Dibble =

American historian (1809–1845)

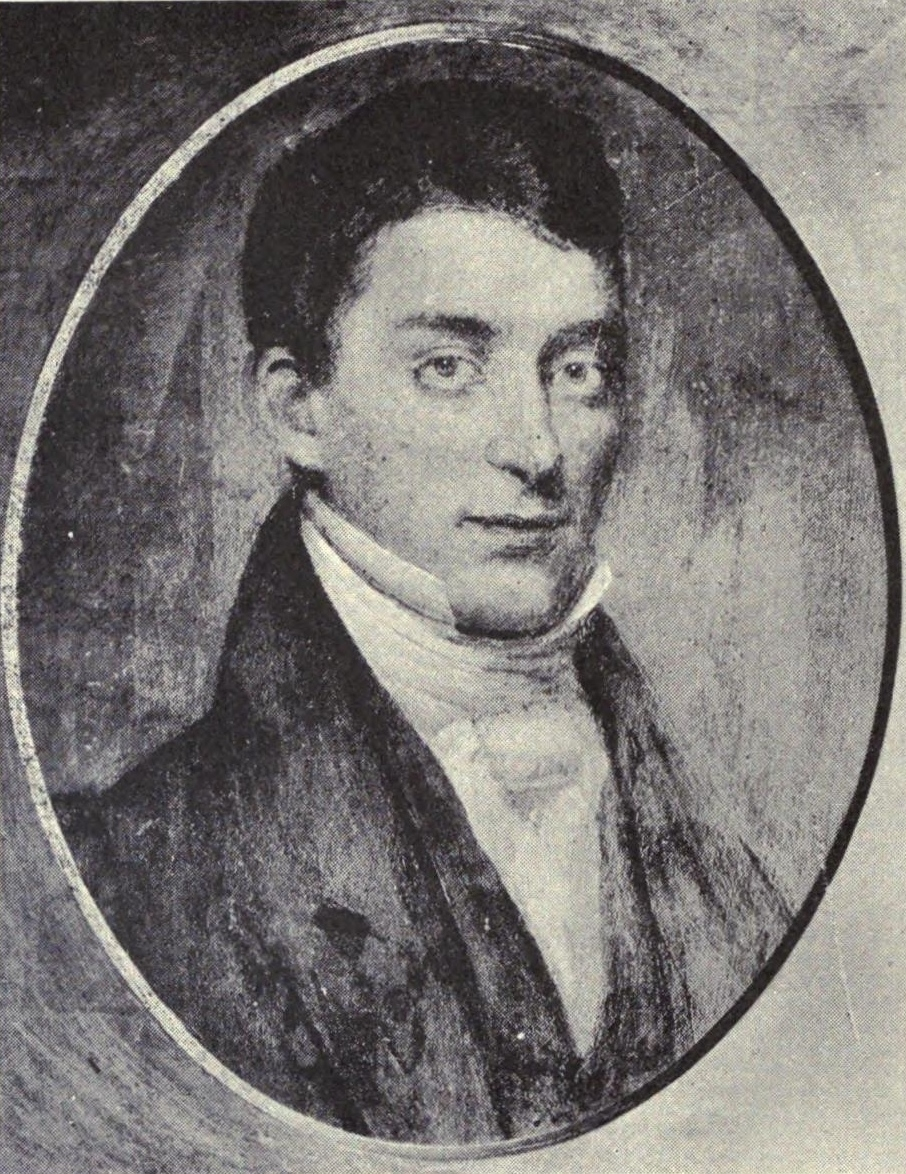
- Portrait painted 1838
- Born: January 26, 1809; Skaneateles, New York
- Died: January 22, 1845 (aged 35); Lahainaluna
- Spouses: Maria Tomlinson; Antoinette Tomlinson
- Children: 4

Sheldon Dibble (January 26, 1809 – January 22, 1845) was a missionary to Hawaii who organized one of the first books on Hawaiian history, and inspired students to write more.

== Early life ==
Dibble was born in Skaneateles, New York on January 26, 1809. He graduated from Hamilton College in 1827, and the Auburn Theological Seminary in October 1830, where he married Maria M. Tomlinson (1808–1837). They arrived in the fourth company from the American Board of Commissioners for Foreign Missions in 1831 on the ship New England from New Bedford. He was one of the youngest missionaries, only 22 years old when he arrived. They had a son who died at the young age of 8 and a daughter Mary, who died at 18 months in 1831, and is buried in Lahainaluna alongside her parents.

After the death of his first wife, he married a cousin of his first wife, Antoinette Tomlinson (1809–1897), in 1839. They had a son Seymour and a daughter Clara. Antoinette and the children moved back to the United States in 1848.

== Work ==
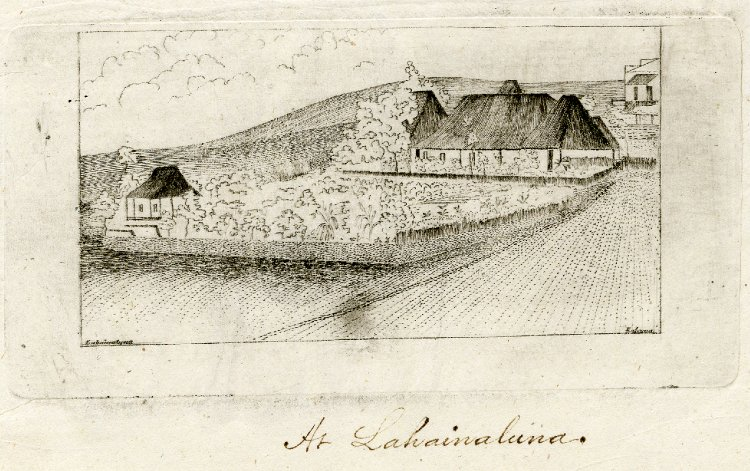
Sheldon Dibble House at Lahainaluna, 1837

He was first stationed at the Hilo mission, but transferred to Maui island in 1836. He became a teacher at Lahainaluna School, the mission seminary founded by Lorrin Andrews at the time. He thought it strange that students were learning the history of other nations but had no books describing their own history. Starting in 1836 he organized a group of students collecting notes from the chiefs and elders of the community, guided by a questionnaire. One of the older students, David Malo, had served as court genealogist during the time of Kamehameha I so took the lead.

In November 1837 (after the death of his first wife) he left and returned to the Auburn Seminary in New York in spring of 1838. In the winter of 1838–1839 he toured the southern United States and gave lectures on Hawaiian history, publishing a 250-page volume of notes. By the fall of 1839 he sailed back to Hawaii, arriving again in the spring of 1840. At the general meeting of missionaries in May 1841 he was assigned to continue refining the book. Lorrin Andrews had a printing press delivered to the Lahainaluna school in 1833, and a number of students had been using it to print newspapers and short text books. The first edition was published on April 28, 1843. He helped establish a Royal Historical Society with Malo and Samuel Kamakau and others, and acted as the first secretary.

He translated books of the Old Testament of the Bible. He prepared text books on grammar and natural history in the Hawaiian language. He died on January 22, 1845, just before his 36th birthday. A second edition of his history was published in 1909 after the circulation of a letter from Dibble containing some corrections. Although his life was cut short, his students, especially Malo and Kamakau went on to be invaluable at preserving Hawaiian history.

== See also ==
- List of Missionaries to Hawaii
