= French invasion of Honolulu =

1849 invasion of the Hawaiian Kingdom by France

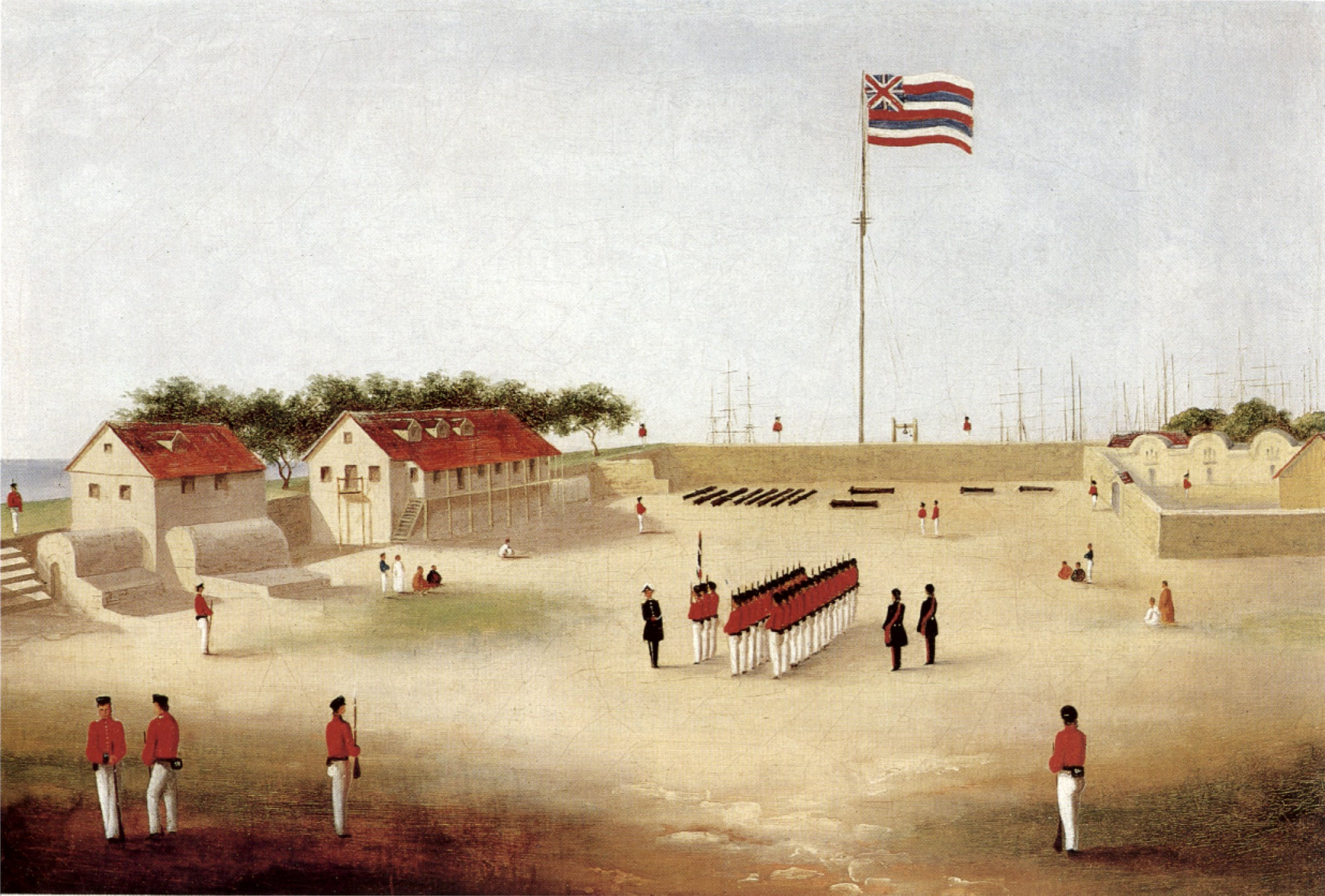
- Honolulu Fort, 1853
Date	August 22 – September 5, 1849
Location	Honolulu, Hawaii
Result	French victory

Belligerents
France	(Hawaii) Hawaiian Kingdom

Commanders and leaders
(French Second Republic) Louis Tromelin	(Hawaii) Kamehameha III

Strength
1 frigate 1 corvette 140 Marines	1 fortress

The French invasion of Honolulu (also known as the Sacking of Honolulu, or the Tromelin Affair) was an attack on Honolulu, capital of the Hawaiian Kingdom, by French admiral Louis Tromelin in 1849 in retribution for the local persecution of Catholics and repression of French trade.

== Prelude ==
In the Treaty of 1843 with Hawaii, France had agreed never on any pretense to take possession of any portion of Hawaiian territory. The French government had issued orders to Guillaume Patrice Dillon, its new consul in Honolulu in 1848: "Avoid in your conduct any show of pugnaciousness [esprit de lutte]. It is befitting that moderation be the one to consolidate the fruits of firmness". Nevertheless, on November 5, 1848, he wrote to the French Foreign Office: "I am convinced that it will prove sufficient to display a good French corvette for three days at Honolulu to force concessions from this devious and hypocritical Government."

On August 12, 1849, French admiral Louis Tromelin arrived in Honolulu Harbor on the corvette Gassendi with the frigate La Poursuivante. While in Honolulu, Tromelin found out about the past persecution of Catholics and the high tariffs on French brandy from Dillon, who oversaw French interests in Hawaii. Tromelin, angered by the Protestant ABCFM missionaries’ intention to shut out Catholicism and French trade, worked with Dillon to compose ten demands to King Kamehameha III on August 22.

== Tromelin's demands ==
1. The complete and loyal adoption of the treaty of March 26th 1846.
2. The reduction of the duty on French brandy to fifty per cent ad valorem.
3. The subjection of Catholic schools to the direction of the chief of the French Mission and to special inspectors not Protestants and a treatment rigorously equal granted to the two worships and to their schools.
4. The use of the French language in all business intercourse between French citizens and the Hawaiian Government.
5. The withdrawal of the alleged exception by which French whalers which imported wine and spirits were affected and the abrogation of a regulation which obliged vessels laden with liquors to pay the custom house officers placed on board to superintend their loading and unloading.
6. The return of all duties collected by virtue of the regulation the withdrawal of which was demanded by the fifth article.
7. The return of a fine of twenty-five dollars paid by the whale ship General Teste besides an indemnity of sixty dollars for the time that she was detained in port.
8. The punishment of certain school boys whose impious conduct in church had occasioned complaint.
9. The removal of the governor of Hawaii for allowing the domicile of a priest to be violated by police officers who entered it to make an arrest or the order that the governor make reparation to that missionary.
10. The payment to a French hotel keeper of the damages committed in his house by sailors from HBM's [His Britannic Majesty's] ship Amphitrite.

== Sacking of Honolulu ==
The demands had not been met by August 25. That afternoon, after a second warning to the civilians of the impending invasion, 140 French Marines, two field pieces, and scaling ladders were landed by boat. The marines took an empty Honolulu Fort from the two men defending it, Governor of Oahu Mataio Kekūanaōʻa and Marshal of the Kingdom Warren Goodale, who did not resist, the fort having been evacuated before the French landed. The marines spiked the coastal guns, threw kegs of powder into the harbor and destroyed all the other weapons they found (mainly muskets and ammunition). They raided government buildings and general property in Honolulu, causing $100,000 in damages. They also took the king's yacht, Kamehameha III, which was sailed to Tahiti and never returned. After these raids, the invasion force withdrew to the fort. During the occupation, men in Honolulu ridiculed the French, and on August 30 they organized a mock attack party making the marines double their guard and send skirmishing patrols out late into night, encountering no attackers. Tromelin eventually recalled his men and left Hawaii on September 5.

== Aftermath ==
Gerrit P. Judd led a party to inquire and settle the incident, leaving for Paris on September 11. Along the way Judd requested support from the United States and United Kingdom, the latter accepting for his case against Tromelin. At first the French government condemned the attack on Honolulu but with the account of Tromelin and Dillon who left with Tromelin on September 5, the French government reconsidered the incident as more justified and did not make reparation for the damages.

== Bibliography ==
- de Vaux, Lieutenant M. L. (1852). Voyage aux îles Hawaï ou Sandwich. Le Puy-en-Velay, France: Annales de la Société d'agriculture, sciences, arts et commerce du Puy.
- Birkett, Mary Ellen. "Forging French Colonial Policy in the Pacific." French Colonial History 8.1 (2007): 155–169. online
- Blue, George Verne. "The Project for a French Settlement in the Hawaiian Islands, 1824-1842," Pacific Historical Review 2#1 (1933), pp. 85-99 online
- Charlot, Jean (1970). "An 1849 Hawaiian Broadside". Hawaiian Journal of History. Vol. 4. pp. 96–104. hdl:10524/514.
- Daws, Gavan (1968). Shoal of Time: A History of the Hawaiian Islands. Honolulu: University of Hawaii Press. ISBN 978-0-8248-0324-7. OCLC 45815755.
- Kuykendall, Ralph Simpson (1965) [1938]. The Hawaiian Kingdom 1778–1854, Foundation and Transformation. Vol. 1. Honolulu: University of Hawaii Press. ISBN 0-87022-431-X. OCLC 47008868.
- Owen, Jean Allan (1898), The story of Hawaii, Harper & Brothers
- Alexander, William DeWitt (1891). A Brief History of the Hawaiian People. New York: American Book Company. OCLC 187412143.
- Hawaiian Journal of History: Devoted to the history of Hawaii, Polynesia and the Pacific area, Volume IV, 1967
