= George Luther Kapeau =

Royal Governor of Hawaii

The Honourable George Luther Kapeau

Royal Governor of Hawaiʻi
- In office 1846–1855
- Monarchs: Kamehameha III; Kamehameha IV
- Preceded by: William Pitt Leleiohoku I
- Succeeded by: Ruth Keʻelikōlani

Personal details
- Born: Maui, Kingdom of Hawaii
- Died: October 1860
- Spouse: Julia Hoa
- Children: George, Jr.
- Occupation: Politician

George Luther Kapeau (died 1860) was a noble and statesman in the Kingdom of Hawaii who was one of the first generation of native Hawaiians to receive a Western education at the missionary founded Lahainaluna School. Despite his obscure family status, he rose to prominence as an advisor to King Kamehameha III. He served many government posts such Royal Governor of the Island of Hawaiʻi and member of the House of Nobles.

== Early life ==
Kapeau was born in Honolulu in the early 19th century, possibly around 1811, to a largely obscure family of lower status. A chief of Maui descent, he was considered a kaukaualiʻi, lesser chiefs or nobles in service to the aliʻi nui (high chiefs). His names means "to crawl on one's knees before high royalty". Contemporary sources also differed on his status. Foreign visitors often called him a chief, especially during his capacity as royal governor, but most of his contemporaries like Samuel Kamakau, missionary Hiram Bingham I, and even King Kamehameha III considered him a makaʻāinana or commoner. Kapeau was one of the first non-royal Hawaiians to receive a western education from the missionaries who arrived in Hawaii in 1820. Enrolled at the Lahainaluna Seminary in 1833, he graduated after four years in 1837.

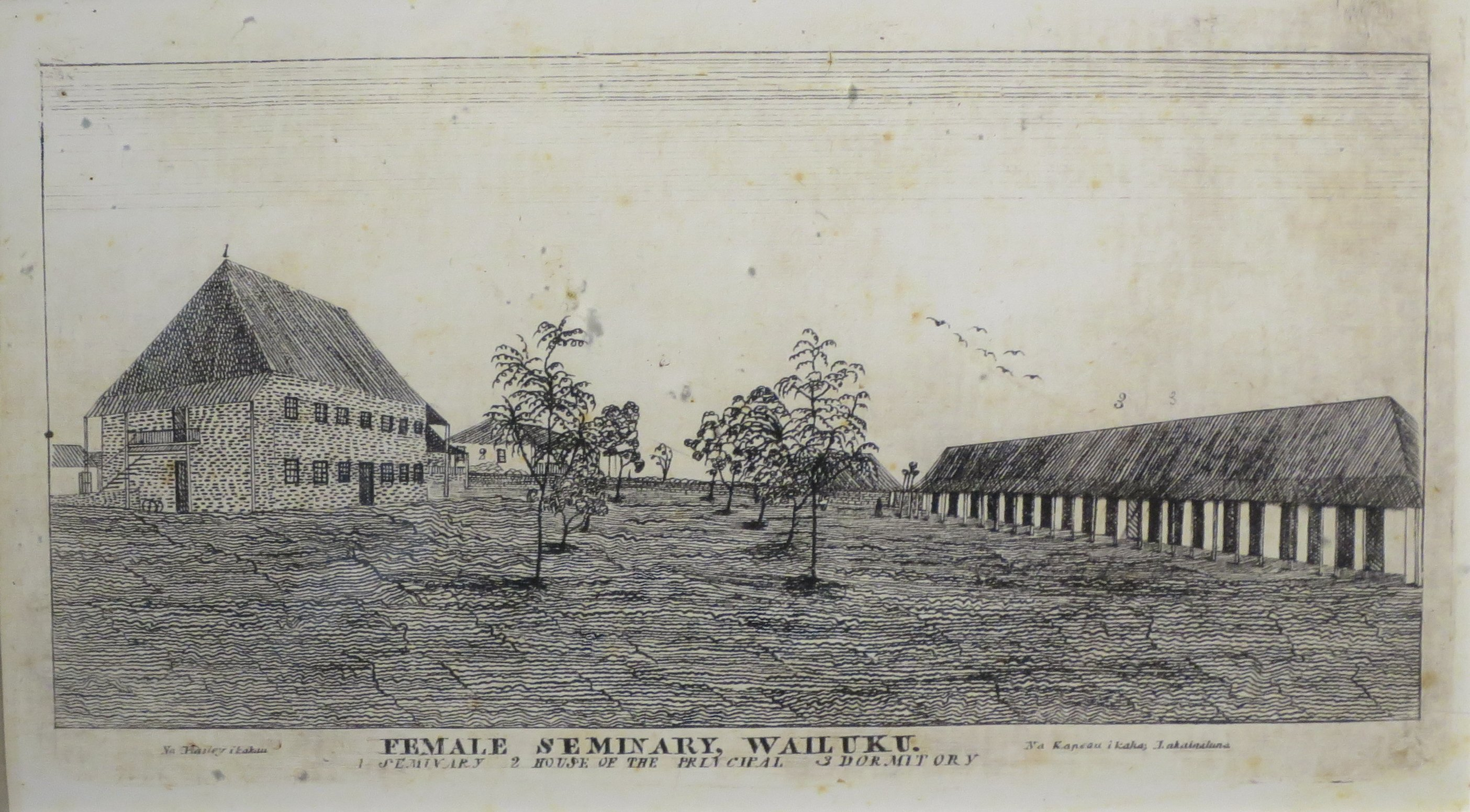
Wailuku Female Seminary, drawn by Edward Bailey, engraved by Kapeau, ca. 1840.

On June 8, 1839, on the occasion of the laying of the cornerstone of Kawaiahaʻo Church, Kapeau personally played part in the ceremony. He made a copper plate, the first engraving ever done by a Hawaiian, which was placed under the stone as a memorial to the Christian mission in Hawaii along with a copy of the newly translated Hawaiian Bible and two volumes on Mathematics and Anatomy. The copper plate read:

"This is a house for Jehovah the God of Heaven, the Father; the Son and the Holy Spirit; a house of prayer erected by the first church and congregation of Honolulu, a place for them to worship the true God. Those people who have been very helpful in this work are Kamehameha III., Kaahumanu II., Auhea, Liliha, Kekauonohi, Kekūanaōʻa, Governor of Oahu, Paki, and Keohokalole.

== Political career ==
Kapeau was greatly trusted by King Kamehameha III, who said, "He understands the work very well, and I wish there were more such men." Kapeau was appointed Secretary of the Treasury. In 1843, he and Jonah Kapena served as clerks in the 1843 session of the Legislature of Hawaii at Lahaina. Kapeau served in the Privy Council as an advisor to the king from 1847 until 1854, the year of Kamehameha III's death. He also served as a member of the House of Nobles from 1848 to 1855. His appointment was challenged by Hawaiian historian and fellow Lahainaluna classmate Samuel Kamakau who regarded his rank of Kaukaualiʻi (low-ranking chief) as too inferior for him to sit as a noble. By the 1850s, however, the House of Nobles consisted mainly of Kaukaualiʻi.

In addition to his legislative posts, he held the post of deputy governor of the Island of Hawaii under Governor William Pitt Leleiohoku I. In 1846, Chester Lyman met both the governor and the deputy governor, but only Kapeau left an impression on him:

He is a man of prepossessing appearance apparently about 35, & converses in English with a good degree of fluency. While at Lahainaluna where he spent 4 years he was distinguished for his skill in engraving, & some of the maps & pictures published at that place were executed by him.

From 1846 to 1850, he served as deputy governor of Hawaii; Leleiohoku died in the measles epidemic of 1848. In 1849, Kapeau contravened the treaty under which the Roman Catholic priests were entitled to import porcelain duty-free by sending tax assessors to attempt to collect taxes on the goods from the priests in Kailua. The actions of the assessors resulted in the smashing of the china, leading the French consul in Honolulu to lodge a complaint over the incident to Admiral de Tromelin, commander of a French warship. Infuriated by the Consul's complaints, the French Admiral made ten demands to King Kamehameha III on August 22. One of these demands was "the removal of the governor of Hawaii for allowing the domicile of a priest to be violated by police officers who entered it to make an arrest or the order that the governor make reparation to that missionary." When the king refused, Admiral de Tromelin invaded Honolulu, sacked the Fort and caused an estimated $100,000 in damages. The situation didn't seem to have any effect on Kapeau's position as acting governor, and in July 1850 he became the official governor of the island after four years as acting governor.

Around February 1849, the English traveler Samuel S. Hill paid a visit to Kailua and met Governor Kapeau:

Kailua, now the capital of Owhyhee, was the seat of the government of the group after the conquests of the renowned Kamehameha I., who, it will be remembered, died here. It is situated within a wide bay, with a safe roadstead and good anchorage. It has a very few more inhabitants than some of the larger villages in the island, though much frequented by the natives living in the vicinity, on account of its being the centre of their civil and religious affairs. It has, however, four stone buildings and a fort. The buildings are, the residence of the governor; that of the parent of the missionaries, Mr. Thurston, whom we have had already occasion to name; and two places of worship. Immediately upon our arrival, we called to pay our respects to the governor, Kapeau, a native chief, who received us with good-humoured frankness, and ordered a room in the government-house to be prepared for our reception and residence; in order, as he said, that we might be as near to him as possible during our stay in the place. We were not long installed, before the hospitable chief came to pay us a visit, and, as it happened to be a bright moonlight night, he invited us to go at once in his company, to inspect the fort, which was in front of his residence, and which in passable English he called the right arm of his strength. We found it consist of a single battery commanding the bay, with twelve pieces of cannon of not very large calibre.

He was the last governor who kept up the maintenance of Kailua Fort.

== Death and legacy ==
On May 7, 1855, Kapeau was appointed Judge of the Third Circuit Court. He married Julia Hoa of Wailuku, Maui and had a son, George, Jr. His wife died in Kona, Hawaii, in June, 1858, and his son died at Wailuku, February 19, 1861. Kapeau died in October 1860, and was succeeded by Ruth Keʻelikōlani, the widow of Leleiohoku, as Governor of Hawaii.

On the ahupuaʻa or land division of Waiʻaha, Kapeau had built his residence located about two thousand feet above Kailua-Kona on the slopes of the dormant volcano of Hualālai. After his death, it was sold to Reverend T. E. Taylor who enlarged the house and lived in it for several years before selling it to King Kamehameha IV who used it as his summer house. In its later days, situated among groves of coffee, orange, breadfruit, and other tropical treas, it was judged "one of the most delightful and healthy spots" in the Islands, "worthy of being made the [king's] Kona country seat." It was later inherited by his widow Queen Emma.

On June 8, 1989, two plaques commemorating the 150th anniversary of the laying of the cornerstone at Kawaiahaʻo Church were erected underneath an 1889 slab that honored the life of missionary Hiram Bingham I on the centennial of his birth. The plaque on the left briefly gives credit to Kapeau's copper plate which had been placed under the cornerstone in 1839.

== Bibliography ==
- Alexander, William DeWitt (1891). A Brief History of the Hawaiian People. New York: American Book Co.
- Andrews, Lorrin (1865). A Dictionary of the Hawaiian language, to which is appended an English-Hawaiian vocabulary and a chronological table of remarkable events. H. M. Whitney. p. 559.
- Bingham, Hiram (1855) [1848]. A Residence of Twenty-one Years in the Sandwich Islands (Third ed.). Canandaigua, NY: H. D. Goodwin.
- Damon, Ethel Mosely (1945). The Stone Church at Kawaiahao, 1820-1944. Honolulu: Trustees of Kawaiahao Church.
- Forbes, David W. (2012). Engraved at Lahainaluna: A History of Printmaking by Hawaiians at the Lahainaluna Seminary, 1834 to 1844, with a Descriptive Catalogue of All Known Views, Maps, and Portraits. Honolulu: Hawaiian Mission Children's Society.
- Forbes, David W., ed. (2001). Hawaiian National Bibliography, 1780-1900. Vol. 3. Honolulu: University of Hawaii Press. p. 173. ISBN 0-8248-2503-9.
- Hawaii (1918). Lydecker, Robert Colfax (ed.). Roster Legislatures of Hawaii, 1841-1918. Honolulu: Hawaiian Gazette Company.
- Hill, Samuel S. (1856). Travels in the Sandwich and Society Islands. London: Chapman & Hall. pp. 207–208.
- Jones, Maude (1937). "The Fort at Kailua, Hawaii". Forty-sixth annual report of the Hawaiian Historical Society for the year 1937. Honolulu: Hawaiian Historical Society. pp. 39–47. hdl:10524/82.
- Kanahele, George S. (1999). Emma: Hawaii's Remarkable Queen. Honolulu: University of Hawaii Press. ISBN 0-8248-2240-4.
- Kamakau, Samuel (1992) [1961]. Ruling Chiefs of Hawaii (Revised ed.). Honolulu: Kamehameha Schools Press. ISBN 0-87336-014-1.
- Lyman, Chester (2006). Teggart, Frederick J. (ed.). Around the Horn to the Sandwich Islands and California, 1845-1850: Being a Personal Record Kept by Chester S. Lyman. Kessinger Publishing. pp. 123, 133, 134. ISBN 1428655026.
- Merry, Sally Engle (2000). Colonizing Hawai'i: the Cultural Power of Law. Princeton: Princeton University Press. pp. 89, 224. ISBN 9780691009322.
- Newbury, Colin (2001). "Patronage and Bureaucracy in the Hawaiian Kingdom, 1840–1893". Pacific Studies. 24 (1–2). Laie, HI: Brigham Young University, Hawaii Campus: 1–38. ISSN 0275-3596. OCLC 193272210. Archived from the original on April 15, 2012.
- Osorio, Jon Kamakawiwoʻole (2002). Dismembering Lāhui: A History of the Hawaiian Nation to 1887. Honolulu: University of Hawaii Press. pp. 35, 45, 69, 80, 90, 91, 109, 269, 270. ISBN 0-8248-2549-7.

Preceded by William Pitt Leleiohoku I	Royal Governor of Hawaiʻi; 1846 - 1855	Succeeded by Ruth Keʻelikōlani
