= Louis Tromelin =

French sailor (1786–1867)

Louis-François-Marie-Nicolas Le Goarant de Tromelin (January 11, 1786 in Morbihan, Gavrin – 1867), was a nineteenth-century French Naval admiral, sent to the Pacific Ocean on political and military missions, and credited with the discovery of Phoenix Island (Rawaki) in the Phoenix group and Fais Island in the Carolines.

== Naval service ==
Tromelin joined the French Navy in 1800, and served on various ships during the Napoleonic Wars, before gaining command of the corvette Bayonnaise in 1826 and on 21 December sailed from Toulon for South America, via the Hawaiian Islands, where he was to report on the political situation and ease the plight of French missionaries. He visited various islands of the Pacific en route, and returned to Toulon 19 March 1829.

Attaining the rank of rear admiral, Tromelin returned to the Pacific in 1846 as commander of the French naval forces in the Pacific. In August 1849 he occupied the fort of Honolulu.

== Island discoveries ==
=== Phoenix Island ===
While aboard the corvette Bayonnaise, Tromelin came across Sydney Island and Phoenix Island, probably in 1828, although some sources state 1823 and 1826. Placing the island at 3°42'S, 189°17'E, Tromelin claimed it was already reported on Norie's map. A "Phenix", plus unnamed islands at similar coordinates feature in Jeremiah N. Reynolds's 1828 report to the American Navy, but the source of the name (and discoverer) remains contentious.

=== Fais Island ===
Tromelin is sometimes credited for the discovery of Fais Island, although that honour might also belong to Francisco de Castro, whose sixteenth century journey to the Philippines took him through the Caroline Islands.
