= Haʻalilio =

Hawaiian diplomat (1808–1844)

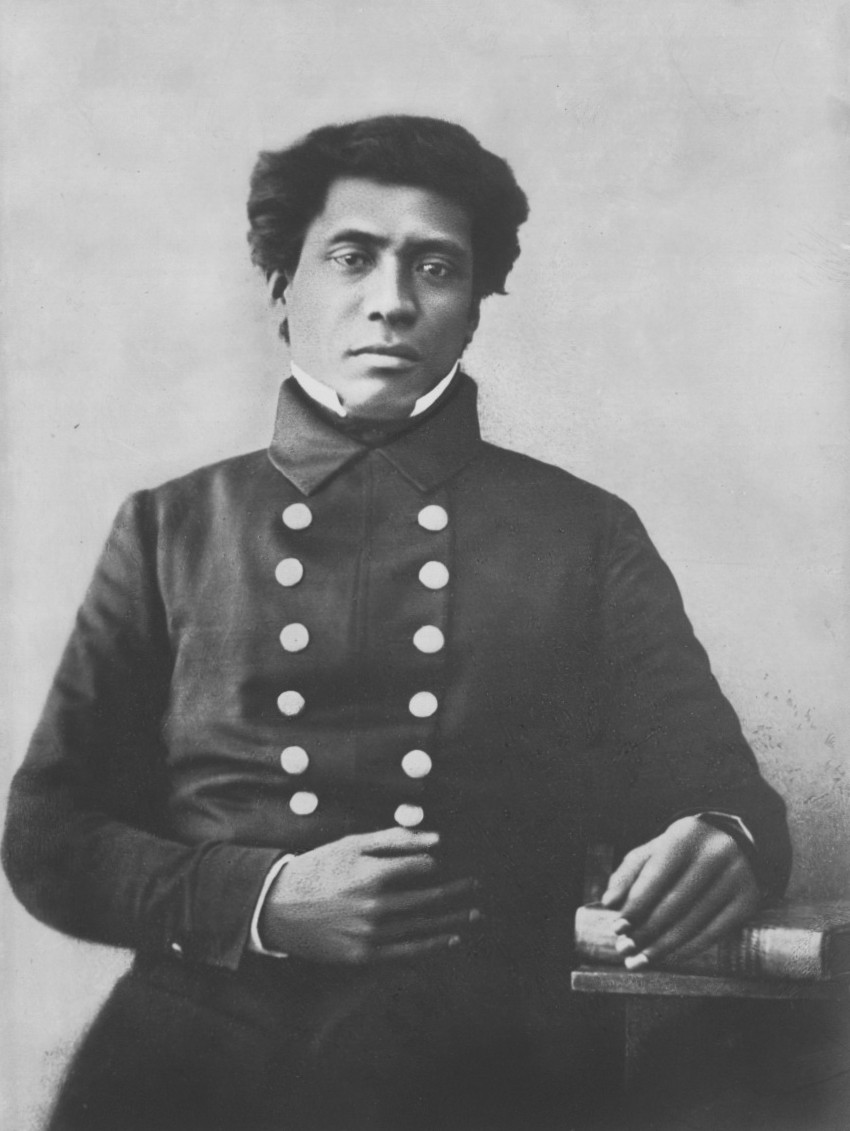

Member of the House of Nobles
- In office 1842–1844
- Monarch: Kamehameha III

Kingdom of Hawaii Envoy to the United States, France and Great Britain
- In office April 8, 1842 – December 3, 1844
- Monarch: Kamehameha III

Personal details
- Born: c. 1808 Oahu, Kingdom of Hawaii
- Died: December 3, 1844 (aged 35–36) off New York, U.S.
- Resting place: Pohukaina or Kawaiahaʻo Cemetery
- Spouse: Hana Hupa Haʻalilio
- Education: Lahainaluna School
- Occupation: Royal Secretary, Diplomat, Politician

Timoteo or Timothy Kamalehua Haʻalilio (1808 – December 3, 1844) was a royal secretary and first diplomat of the Kingdom of Hawaii. He is best known for helping Hawaii in gaining recognition from Britain, France, and the United States as an independent sovereign nation.

== Life ==
Haʻalilio was born early in the 19th century, probably 1808. He was the son Koeleele (or Koelele), and his wife Kipa, in some accounts Eseta (Esther) Kipa. He was the half-brother of Levi Haʻalelea, who later became a husband of Princess Kekauōnohi. He was of the aliʻi class or Hawaiian nobility. He was included in the first English school set up by Hiram Bingham I in Honolulu around April 1821. In 1823 William Richards joined the mission, and became a teacher and friend for the rest of his life. After learning of the death of King Kamehameha II in 1825, Haʻalilio was selected to be the royal secretary of King Kamehameha III. Jean Baptiste Rives who had served as Kamehameha II's secretary had been accused of mismanagement of funds and never returned to Hawaii. He took the Christian name Timothy, which was "Timoteo" in the Hawaiian language spelling.

On June 7, 1826, he married Hana Hopua (Hannah Hooper), the daughter of an American father, Hopua and Polunu. The couple had no children and his wife outlived him and inherited some lands in the Great Mahele in 1848.

In 1831 the Lahainaluna School was founded, and he continued his education there. In July 1839 he was offered as a hostage during the French Incident. Captain Cyrille Pierre Théodore Laplace described him as:

The king's secretary and one of his favorites was a handsome young man of frank, pleasant countenance and good manners; he wore European dress and spoke English quite well.

He was a member of the hulumanu (bird feathers), a group of often flamboyant favorites of King Kamehameha III that originally included Kamehamea IIIʻs aikāne (intimate friend) Kaomi Moe

In the 1840 Constitution of the Kingdom of Hawaii, he was included in the first members of the House of Nobles. Haʻalilio was a founding member of the first Hawaiian Historical Society in 1841.

On April 8, 1842, he was appointed as the first diplomat of the kingdom, envoy to the United States, France and Great Britain. Richards would assist him as advisor and translator. In May he was appointed to a treasury board, along with John Papa ʻĪʻī and Gerrit P. Judd.

Haʻalilio and Richards left on July 18, 1842, for their diplomatic mission. Instead of sailing via Cape Horn, they went through Mexico and over land. They took a steamer to Washington, D.C. December 5. After a week waiting to see Daniel Webster who was the U.S. Secretary of State, they had their appointment on December 7. By December 19, 1842, they had verbal assurance of U.S. recognition, but no formal treaty. While in Washington, he became quite the celebrity as the first distinguished man of color to visit the nation's capital. An incident occurred on board the steamboat Globe, in which Haʻalilio was mistaken for Richards' slave. They tried purchasing two tickets for breakfast but instead were given one and a half, one for Richards and the half for his servant. Even after Richards explained to the captain that he was Haʻalilio's servant and that he was an ambassador from the "King of the Sandwich Islands" to the President, the captain refused to allow any "colored man" to sit at the table. They next sailed to England.

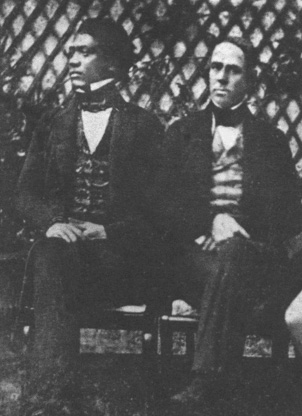
Haʻalilio and Richards on 1842–1844 diplomatic mission

In London they met up with Sir George Simpson of the Hudson's Bay Company and requested a visit with Lord Aberdeen who was British Secretary of State for Foreign Affairs. February 1843 Richards, Sir George Simpson and Haʻalilio visited King Leopold I of Belgium. On March 17, 1843, they met François Guizot who was the French Foreign Minister. Both verbally accepted Hawaiian independence, and so did Lord Aberdeen on another visit on March 25. Confident in their success, Sir George Simpson returned to Canada, thinking Richards and Haʻalilo could wrap up the details through April and May 1843. Finally on November 13, 1843, Lord Aberdeen and the French ambassador Louis Saint-Aulaire agreed on terms and signed an agreement on November 28. It was a joint declaration, not a treaty, so did not clarify status.

They returned to America, and visited the new Secretary of State John C. Calhoun who was invited to also sign the agreement, but said he would wait for a treaty that could be ratified by the Senate. They left Boston November 18, 1844, on the ship Montreal, but Haʻalilio's health declined, and he died December 3, 1844, off the coast of New York. He probably had been suffering from tuberculosis through the long northern winters. Richards brought his body back on March 21, 1845, to Honolulu. A funeral was held March 26, and a memorial was held in the legislature at its next session. Bingham offered this praise:

Haalilio was a man of intelligence, of good judgement, of pleasing manners, and respectable business habits. ...few public officers possess integrity more trustworthy.

== Family tree ==
Keakealanikane	Kaleiheana
Moanakane	Piʻilaniwahine
Kapuni-a-Moana	Lono-a-Moana	Kauhi-a-Haki	Iliki-a-Moana
Manua a.k.a. Uaua	Moanawahine
Kuaina (Haaleleaina)	Ahumaikealake
Malo	Haʻaloʻu (k)	Koeleele (k)	Kipa (w)
Levi Haʻalelea	Timoteo Haʻalilio
