= David Malo =

Hawaiian historian (1795–1853)

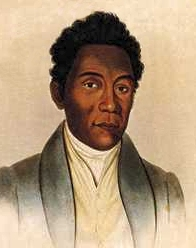
- David Malo
- Born: 1795; Keauhou, Kingdom of Hawaii
- Died: October 25, 1853 (aged 57–58); Maui, Kingdom of Hawaii
- Occupations: Chiefly Counselor, Hawaiian Intellectual, Historian, Minister
- Spouse(s): Aʻalailoa, Bathsheba Pahia, Rebecca Lepeka
- Children: Emma Aʻalailoa Malo Kapena

David Malo or Davida Malo (birth name: Malo, 1795–1853) was a chiefly counselor, a Hawaiian intellectual, educator, politician and minister. He is remembered by subsequent generations of Hawaiian people and scholars primarily as a Native Hawaiian historian of the Kingdom of Hawaii. In 1852 he was ordained as a minister at Kēōkea, Maui.

== Life ==
Malo was born in Keauhou on the Island of Hawaiʻi around 1793. His father was named Aoʻao and mother was named Heone. He grew up during the period when Kamehameha I united the islands into a single kingdom. Malo was associated with the chief Kuakini, who was a brother of Queen Kaʻahumanu, during this time of great change, probably serving as oral historian and court genealogist. Early in life, he married Aʻalailoa (1790?–1822), a widow much older than him, but they had no children when she died.

In 1823 Malo moved to Lahaina on the Hawaiian island of Maui and became a student of Reverend William Richards, learning how to read and write in both English and Hawaiian. Malo converted to Christianity and was given the baptismal name of David; he spelled his name Davida following open syllables norm in his language.

He married again to a woman named Pahia (1796–1845), who took the Christian name Bathsheba; she also died without children. He was a member of the first class at the Lahainaluna School, later serving as school master. He married a third time to Lepeka (1810–1853), who took the Christian name Rebecca, and had one daughter he named Aʻalailoa after his first wife, given the Christian name Emma (1846–1886); she later married John M. Kapena with whom she had a daughter Leihulu Kapena (1868–1930), the wife of Henry Carter. in 1841 he was elected as representative from Maui to the first House of Representatives of the Kingdom.

== Later life ==
He was ordained into the Christian ministry and settled down in the seaside village of Kalepolepo on South/West Maui where he remained until his death on October 25, 1853.

His grave is located above the Lahainaluna School on Maui. The Lahainaluna School has named the Boys' Dormitory after him, and has an annual celebration of his contribution in mid-April.

== Works ==
When Queen Kaʻahumanu died in June 1832, Malo composed a grief chant in her honor titled He Kanikau o Ka'ahumanu. He worked alongside Rev. William Richards to translate the book of Matthew, as he was Richardsʻ Hawaiian language teacher.

He wrote a history of Kamehameha I, but the manuscript was lost.

In 1852 he supervised building Kilolani Church on Maui. Its ruins are now on the grounds of the Trinity by-the-Sea Episcopal Church near modern-day Kihei, located at 20°45′42.32″N 156°27′10.65″W.

=== Ka Moʻolelo Hawaiʻi ===
From about 1835 he started writing notes on the Hawaiian religion and cultural history, along with members of the school and instructor Sheldon Dibble. David Malo was part of the class that conducted research into Hawaiian history and published their findings in the work Ka Mooolelo Hawaii, 1838 (a facsimile of this original has been recently reprinted). He helped form the first Hawaiian Historical Society with Samuel Kamakau in 1841. After that group disbanded, another society of the same name was founded in 1892.

In 1858 more stories were added to his book and a second Hawaiian edition was published. The book was translated by Nathaniel Bright Emerson and published in English in 1898, and again in 1951 and 1987 editions. An anonymous unfinished translation of Ka Moʻolelo was later discovered from the Bishop Museum archives by University of Hawaiʻi at Mānoa theology professor Jeffrey Lyon in 2017; it was the basis for an updated bilingual version with Charles Langlas (UH Hilo) under the title of The Moʻolelo Hawaii of Davida Malo published in 2020 with an introduction by Noelani Arista.

=== Writings in Hawaiian-language newspapers ===
All of Maloʻs writing, his intellectual production and the moʻokūʻauhau (genealogies), kanikau (laments), letters and published works were all composed in the Hawaiian language. Maloʻs kanikau for Kaʻahumanu is regarded as one of the most beautiful and complex of any kanikau composed in the 19th century, and was published several times over the course of the 19th century in Hawaiian language newspapers. Malo composed several kanikau for prominent women in his life, here is a list of some of Maloʻs writings that appeared in newspapers, including the kanikau.

- He Kanikau no Kaahumanu
- Na Harieta Nahienaena
- Ka Make o Kuakini
- Ka Make Ana o Batesepa Puhia, Ka Wahine o D. Malo
- Eia ua Mele Kanikau la

== See also ==
- Hale Nauā Society
