= Lahainaluna High School =

Location
- 980 Lahainaluna Road; Lahaina, Hawaii 96761; United States

Information
- Type: Public, Co-educational
- Motto: "O Ke'ia Ka Kukui Pio Ole I Ka Makani O Kauaula"
- Established: 1831; 195 years ago
- School district: Hawaii Department of Education
- Principal: Richard Carosso
- Teaching staff: 63.00 (FTE)
- Grades: 9–12
- Enrollment: 870 (2023–2024)
- Student to teacher ratio: 13.81
- Campus: Suburban
- Colors: Red and White
- Athletics: Maui Interscholastic League
- Mascot: Lunas
- Accreditation: Western Association of Schools and Colleges
- Yearbook: Ka Lama
- Military: United States Army JROTC
- Website: lahainalunahs.org

Lahainaluna High School is a public high school serving grades 9–12, located in Lahaina on the island of Maui. Operated by the Hawaii Department of Education, Lahainaluna High School is also a public boarding school. It was founded in 1831 as a Protestant missionary school, originally named Lahainaluna Seminary. The early missionaries who arrived in Lahaina in 1823 explained to the Hawaiian Royalty the importance of an educational institution in the American style.

A number of the pioneers, students and teachers are buried in a small graveyard behind several buildings on the campus. It was the first formal European-American style school founded in Hawaii and has continued to operate to this day.

== History and traditions ==
American William Richards founded the missionary station in Lahaina in 1823. In June 1831, Lorrin Andrews was chosen as first principal of a seminary for boys and young men. The site was named Lahainaluna for "upper Lahaina". On September 5, 1831, classes began in thatched huts with 25 Hawaiian young men as students, including former royal historian David Malo. The second principal was William Patterson Alexander, who served from 1843–1856. The school eventually became part of the public school system in Hawaii. The post-secondary program later became developed as part of the first University of Hawaii.

Lahainaluna has a boarding program where students from the outer islands (including students from the "other side of the island") can live and study at either of the campus dormitories. In return, they do various jobs around the campus, such as maintaining the landscape, tending to the farm animals, and making student meals at the cafeteria; they work 18 hours per week. Initially and exclusively for males, the boarding program became coed in 1980. The two dorms are David Malo Dormitory for the boys and Hoapili Dormitory for the girls. Previously, Hoapili housed both genders. Lahainaluna is one of very few public boarding schools in the nation.

There is an 30-ft "L" on the mountain-side overlooking Lahaina at the 2,000 ft elevation mark. The "L" stands for Lahainaluna and has been there since 1904 according to some sources. However, according to Lahaina News and Flux Hawaii, the landmark was determined to be built in 1929, based on interviews conducted by Lahainaluna High School. Twice a year, the boarders at Lahainaluna lay a fresh coat of white lime on Pu'u Pa'u Pa'u. The boarding students must carry 50-pound (23 kg) sacks of lime to the site, clear the weeds, and clean up the site. Added to the "L" are embellishments of the year and athletic championships for the previous year. On a clear day, the freshly limed L can be seen from the island of Molokai. It is located at coordinates 20°53′15″N 156°38′29″W. Lime is used because it's natural and does not interfere with the ecosystem. After the students have completed restoring the "L", they lay fresh leis at David Malo's gravesite, chant, sing and pray.

Historically, on graduation day, alumni hike up the "L" and light up torches that line the "L" to symbolize the graduates who have received their diplomas.

The school celebrates David Malo Day annually. That day a feast is served and the Hawaiiana Club puts on a performance.

Members and coaches of the Lahainaluna High School football team partook in the pre-game coin toss ceremony during Super Bowl LVIII after the 2023 Hawaii wildfires left much of Lahaina destroyed.

== Hale Paʻi ==
- Hale Paʻi
- U.S. National Register of Historic Places
- Hawaiʻi Register of Historic Places
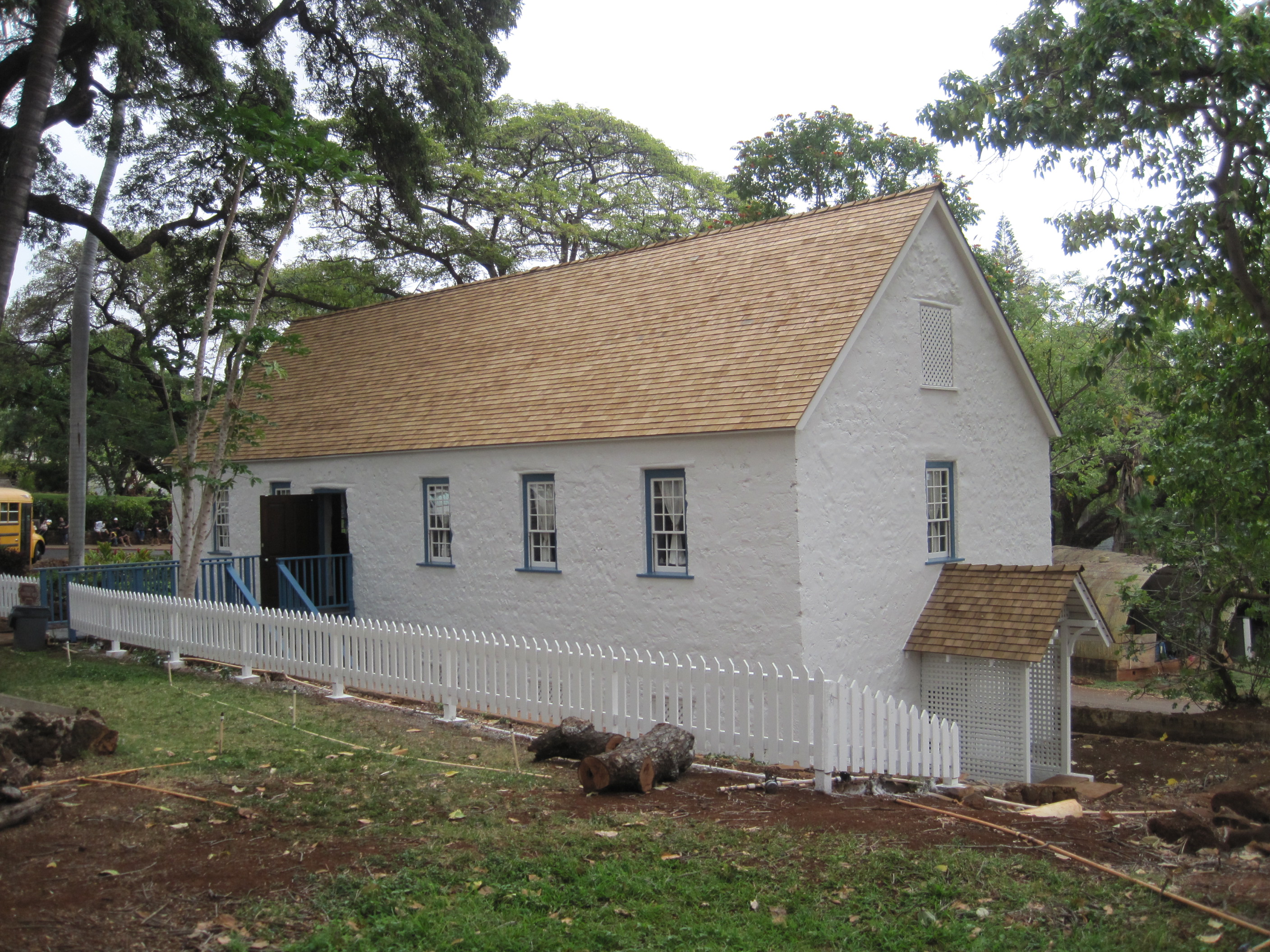
- Hale Paʻi

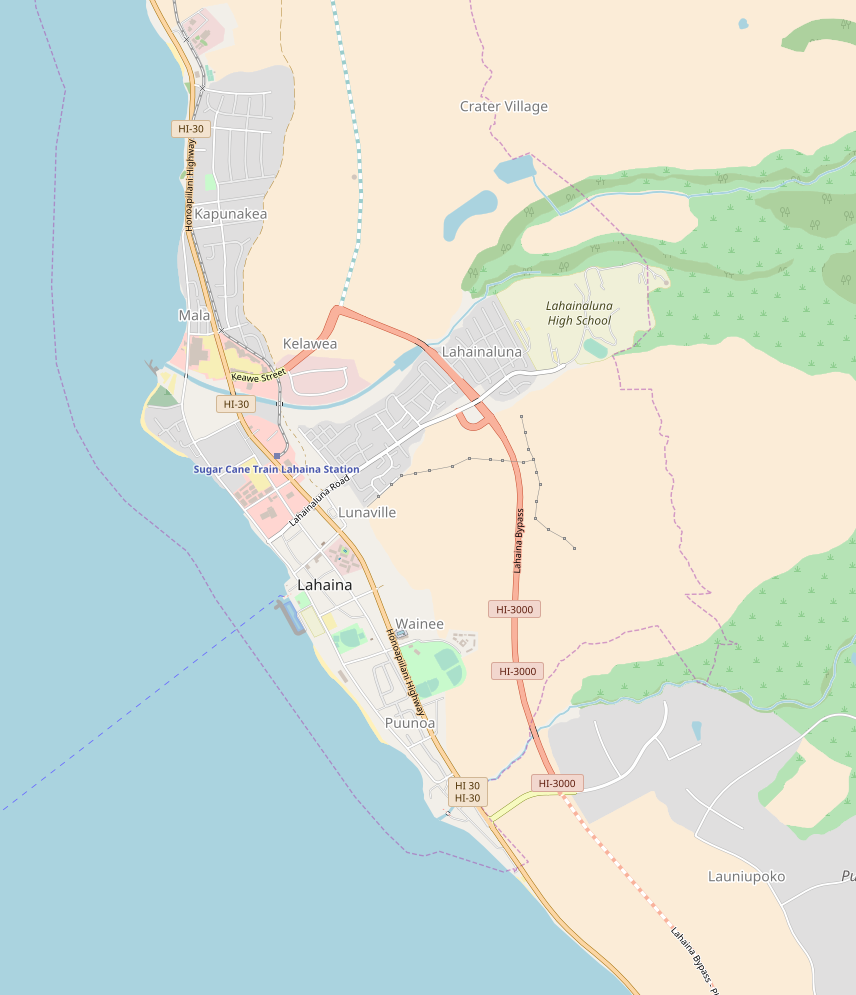
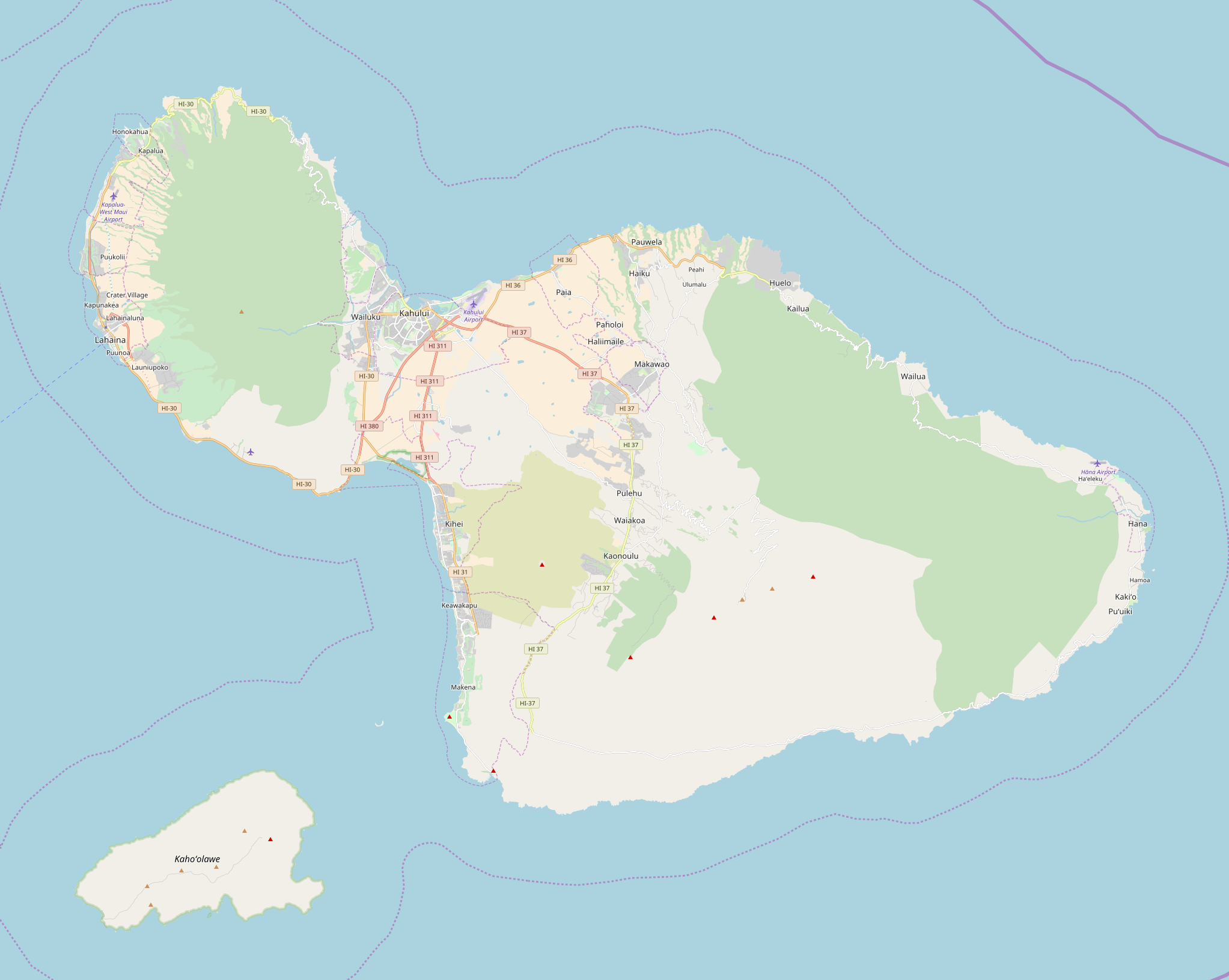
- Location within Lahaina, Hawaii Location within Maui Location within Hawaii
- Location: Lahainaluna High School, Lahainaluna, Hawaii
- Coordinates: 20°53′24″N 156°39′36″W
- Area: Less than one acre
- Built: 1834
- NRHP reference No.: 76000662
- HRHP No.: 50-50-03-01596

Significant dates
- Added to NRHP: May 13, 1976
- Designated HRHP: May 13, 1976

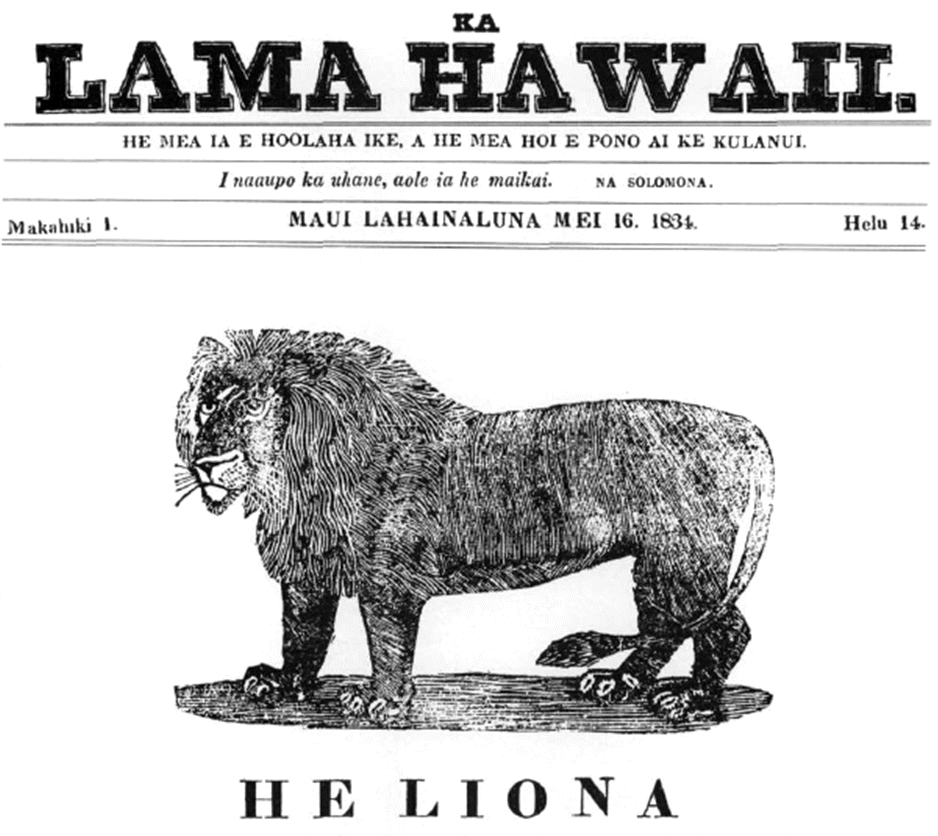
Front page of 1834 student newspaper

Hale Paʻi, or the house of printing, is a small coral and timber building on the Lahainaluna campus that, starting in 1834, served as the home of Hawaii's first printing press. English and Hawaiian language Bibles, books and newspapers were printed here, including the first newspaper printed west of the Rocky Mountains. The first paper currency of Hawaii was printed here in 1843. A student was expelled in 1844 for counterfeiting, which resulted in the government re-issuing all the paper money with secret marks.

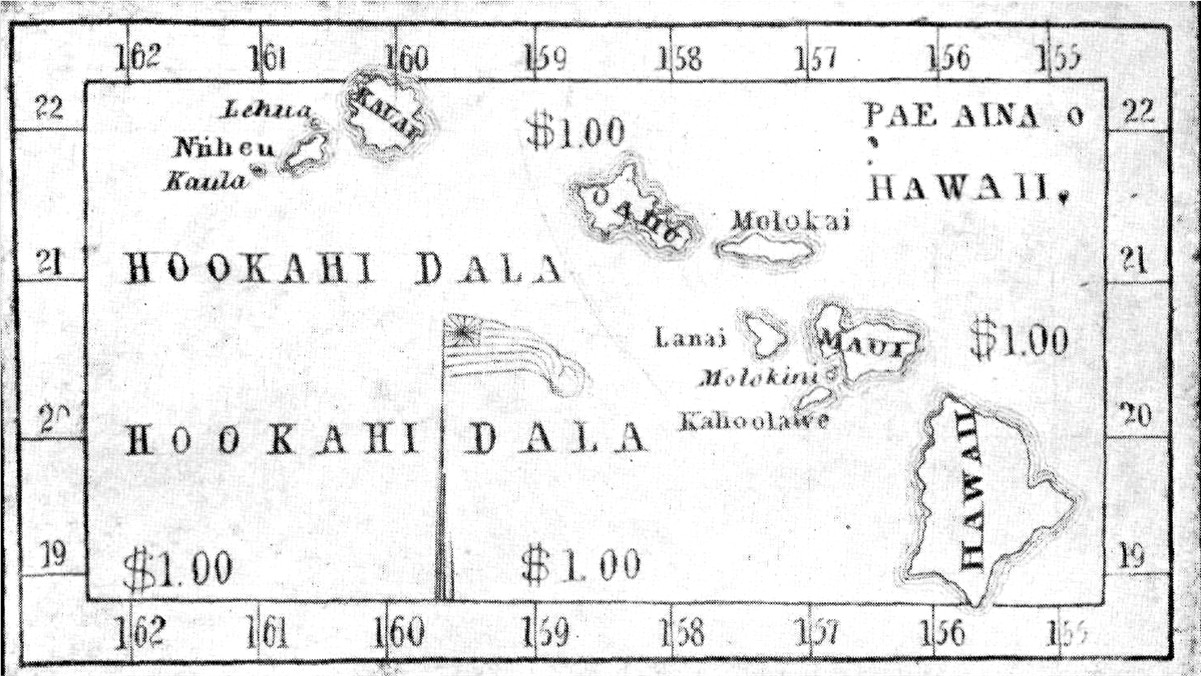
A map of the islands on the one dollar bill, ho'okahi dala, printed in 1843 at the school press

Many archived publications are on public display at the site, now a museum maintained by the Lahaina Restoration Foundation. Hale Pa'i, also known as Hawaii Site No. 50-03-1596, was listed on the National Register of Historic Places in 1976.

== Campus ==
Lahainaluna High School is located on the side of an extinct volcano. The multiple classroom buildings are widespread. The grounds are covered with many benches, pathways, grass, plants and trees, the latter providing shade. The ceramic sculpture Orbit by Toshiko Takaezu is located here. A small stream runs near the school, past the Agriculture area. Lahainaluna is high enough on this volcano to allow views of the Pacific and of the islands of Molokaʻi, Lānaʻi and Kahoʻolawe.

It has a boarding facility available. The program takes American students and students with other citizenships. Girls go to the Hoapili Dormitory and boys go to the David Malo Dormitory.

== Notable alumni ==
- Timothy Haʻalilio, Class of 1835 – Native Hawaiian politician
- Samuel Kamakau, Class of 1837 – Native Hawaiian historian and scholar
- Jonah Kapena, Class of 1835 – Native Hawaiian politician
- Boaz Mahune, Class of 1835 – Native Hawaiian politician
- David Malo, Class of 1835 – Native Hawaiian scholar, adviser to the Hawaiian royal family
- Jonatana Napela, Native Hawaiian attorney, judge and Latter-Day Saints convert, helped translate the Book of Mormon into the Hawaiian language
- William Kahaialiʻi, "Willie K", Class of 1979 – Hawaiian music artist
- Kealiʻi Reichel, Class of 1980 – Hawaiian Music artist
- Hercules Mataʻafa, Class of 2014 - NFL player, 2017 Polynesian College Football Player of the Year, and Consensus All American. Now plays for the Minnesota Vikings.

== See also ==
- Betsey Stockton
- List of boarding schools in the United States
