= Samuel Kamakau =

Hawaiian historian (1815–1876)

Samuel Mānaiakalani Kamakau
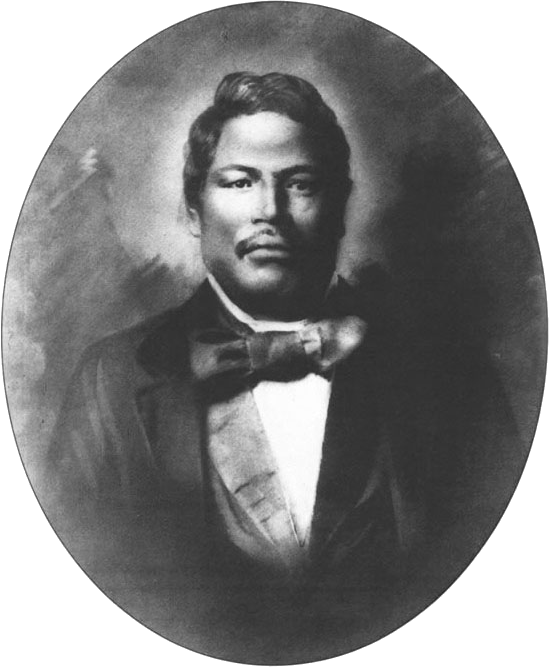
- Born: October 29, 1815; Mokulēia, Oahu, Kingdom of Hawaii
- Died: September 5, 1876 (aged 60); Honolulu, Oʻahu, Hawaiʻi
- Occupations: Historian, Teacher, Writer
- Spouse: Hainakolo
- Children: Kukelani Kaʻaʻapookalani

Samuel Mānaiakalani Kamakau (October 29, 1815 – September 5, 1876) was a Hawaiian historian and scholar. His work appeared in local newspapers and was later compiled into books, becoming an invaluable resource on the Hawaiian people, Hawaiian culture, and Hawaiian language while they were disappearing.

Along with David Malo and John Papa ʻĪʻī, Kamakau is considered one of Hawaii's greatest historians, and his contributions to the preservation of Hawaiian history have been honored throughout the State of Hawaiʻi.

== Life ==
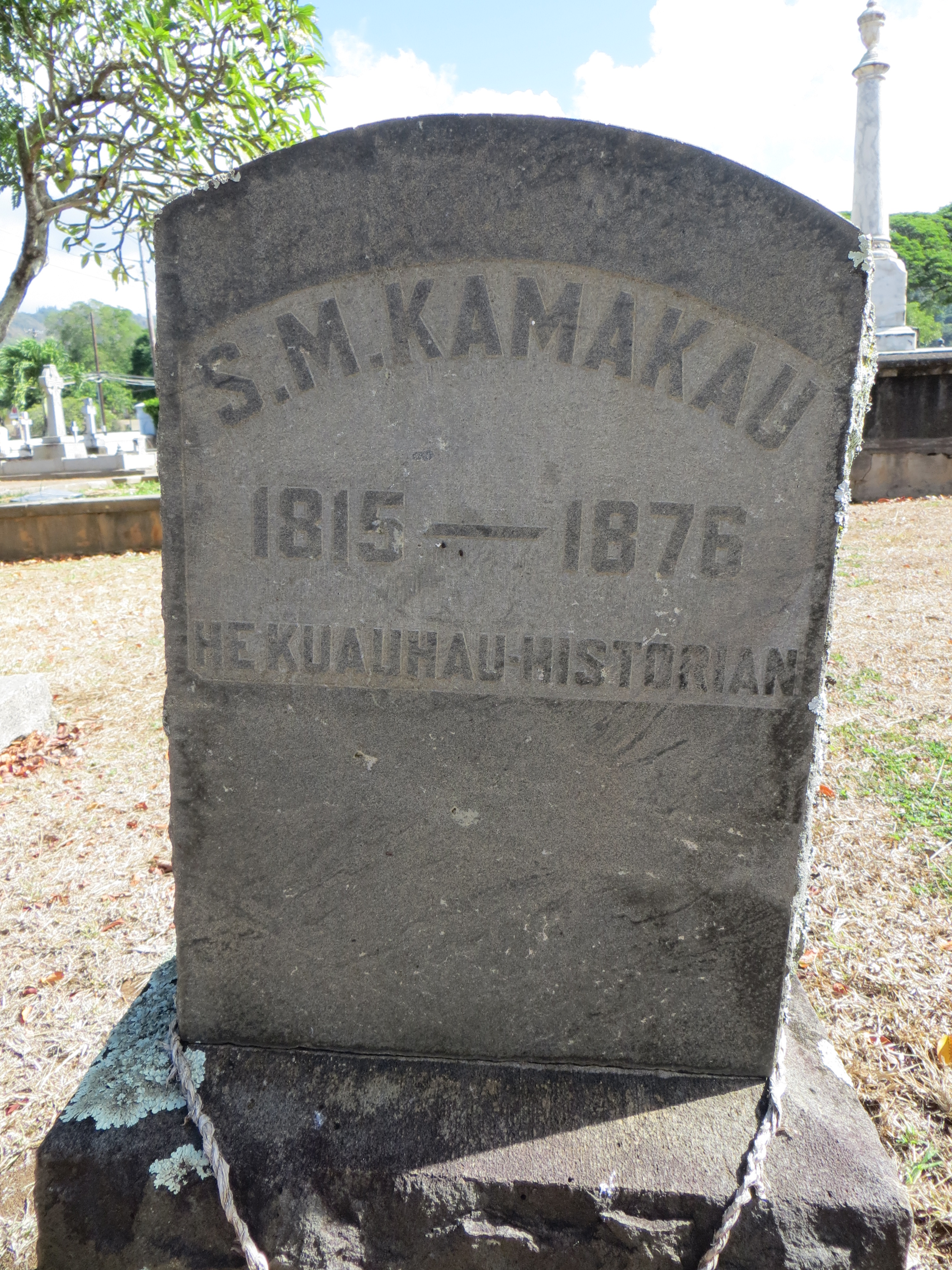
Grave marker of Samuel Kamakau in Oahu Cemetery

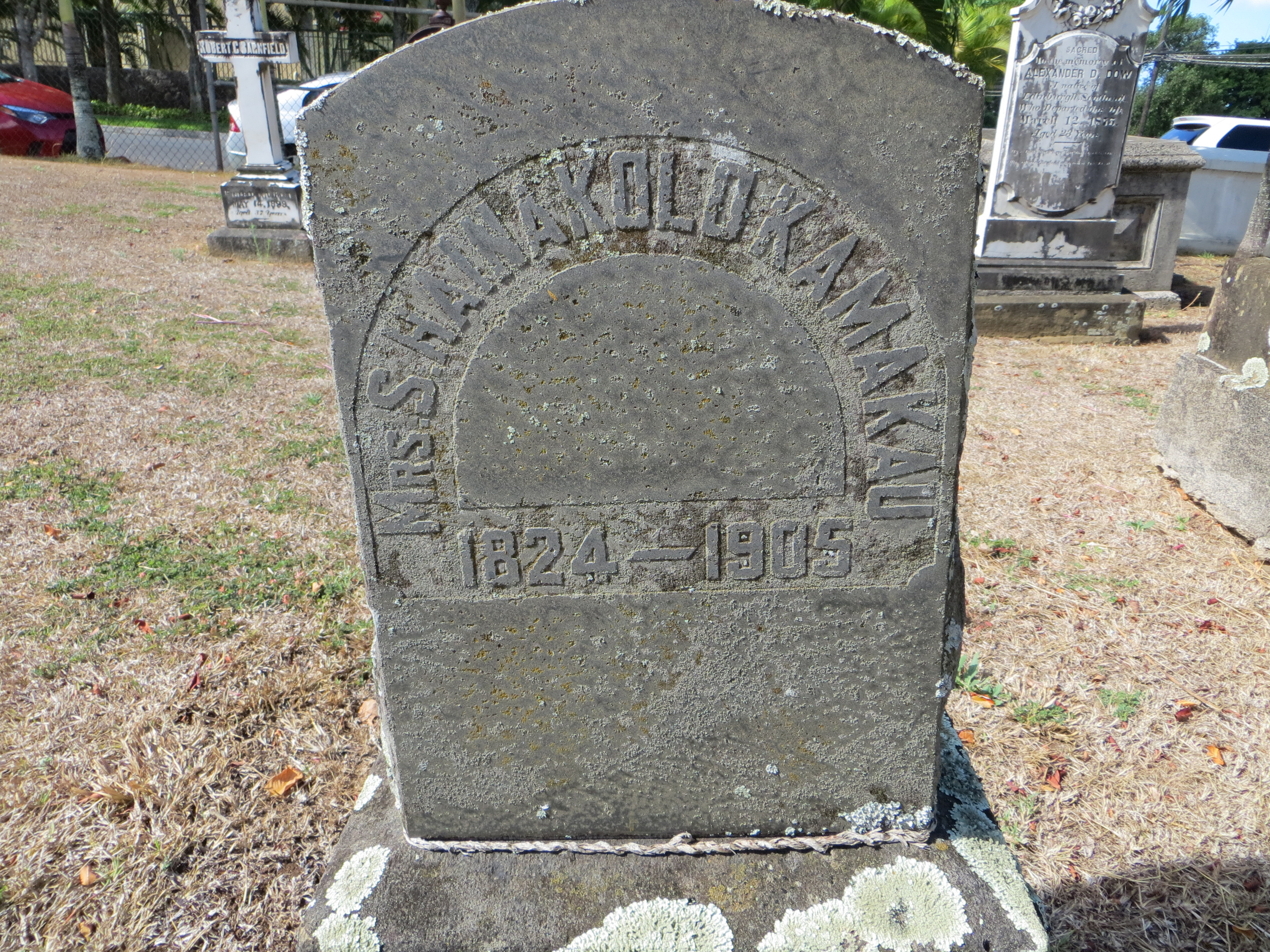
Grave marker of Hainakolo Kamakau in Oahu Cemetery

Kamakau was born in Mokulēia, Waialua on the North Shore of the island of Oʻahu. He traveled to the island of Maui and enrolled at Lahainaluna Seminary in 1833, where he became a student of Reverend Sheldon Dibble. Dibble instructed Kamakau and other students to collect and preserve information on the Hawaiian culture, language, and people. To further this goal, Kamakau helped form the first Hawaiian historical society in 1841. According to Kamakau:

A society was started at Lahainaluna according to the desire of the teachers. As the people of Alebione (Albion) had their British history and read about the Saxons and William, so the Hawaiians should read their history...The King said he thought the history of all the islands should be preserved from first to last.

Known as the Royal Hawaiian Historical Society, members included King Kamehameha III, John Young, Timothy Haʻalilio, David Malo, Dwight Baldwin, William Richards, Sheldon Dibble, Kamakau and others. Elected officials included president Kamehameha III, vice-president William Richards, secretary Sheldon Dibble, and treasurer Samuel Kamakau. The society disbanded after the capital of the Kingdom of Hawaii moved from Lahaina on the island of Maui to Honolulu, Oahu in 1845.

Kamakau married S. Hainakolo and moved to his wife's hometown of Kīpahulu. Their daughter, Kukelani Kaʻaʻapookalani, was born in December 1862, after which the couple moved to Oʻahu.

In 1860 Kamakau converted to Roman Catholicism from Congregational Protestantism.

From 1866 to 1871, Kamakau wrote a series of newspaper articles about Hawaiian culture and history: "Ka Moʻolelo o Kamehameha I", a history of Kamehameha I; "Ka Moʻolelo o Nā Kamehameha", a history of the House of Kamehameha; and "Ka Moʻolelo Hawaiʻi", a history of Hawaiʻi. The articles were published in the Hawaiian language newspapers, Ke Au ʻOkoʻa and Ka Nūpepa Kūʻokoʻa. Kamakau has served as a district judge in Wailuku, Maui and was a legislator for the Hawaiian Kingdom. From 1851 to 1860 he represented Maui in the House of Representatives, and from 1870 to 1876 represented Oʻahu. He died at his home in Honolulu on September 5, 1876, and was buried in the Maʻemaʻe Chapel Cemetery in Nuʻuanu Valley.

== Legacy ==
On October 29, 1994, the Hawaii & Pacific Section in the Hawaii State Library was named the "Samuel Manaiakalani Kamakau Room" in honor of Kamakau's legacy as a "great Hawaiian historian who also served his community as an outstanding writer, scholar, jurist, and legislator." In 2000, a Hawaiian immersion school in Kāneʻohe, Oʻahu recognized Kamakau's contributions by naming their school Ke Kula ʻo Samuel M. Kamakau. The Hawaiʻi Book Publishers Association's annual Ka Palapala Poʻokela ("excellent manuscript") competition presents the Samuel M. Kamakau Award for the best Hawaiʻi Book of the Year.

In 2005, the Hawaii State Legislature passed H.R. No. 55, declaring October 29, 2005 "Samuel Manaiakalani Kamakau Day":

WHEREAS, SAMUEL MANAIAKALANI KAMAKAU, born October 29, 1815, in Mokuleia, Waialua, Oahu, has been noted by many as one of Hawaii's greatest historians of Hawaiian culture and heritage; and
WHEREAS, as a noted writer, SAMUEL MANAIAKALANI KAMAKAU authored books in Hawaiian that would later be translated by esteemed organizations such as the Bishop Museum and Kamehameha Schools, for future generations to learn from; and
WHEREAS, by his actions and through his passion for accurately recording native Hawaiian history, SAMUEL MANAIAKALANI KAMAKAU teaches our keiki, both Hawaiian and non-Hawaiian, what life was like as a Hawaiian, and thereby preserves for posterity, the legacy of a storied people; and
WHEREAS, along with maintaining a record of Hawaiian history, SAMUEL MANAIAKALANI KAMAKAU through his birth and affiliation with Waialua, solidifies Waialua's position as a stronghold for Hawaiian culture; now, therefore,
BE IT RESOLVED by the House of Representatives of the Twenty-third Legislature of the State of Hawaii, Regular Session of 2005, that this body commemorates SAMUEL MANAIAKALANI KAMAKAU's contributions to memorializing Hawaiian history by proclaiming October 29, 2005, as SAMUEL MANAIAKALANI KAMAKAU Day.

== Works ==
In 1961, the Kamehameha Schools Press published Kamakau's first two series as a book entitled Ruling Chiefs of Hawaiʻi. Three years later, in 1964, the Bishop Museum Press published his last series as a trilogy, entitled Ka Poʻe Kahiko: The People of Old, The Works of the People of Old: Nā Hana A Ka Poʻe Kahiko, and Tales and Traditions of the People of Old: Nā Moʻolelo A Ka Poʻe Kahiko. A revised edition of Ruling Chiefs of Hawaiʻi was published in 1992.

A new compilation book of history articles written for Ka Nūpepa Kūʻokoʻa from October 1866 to February 1868 was released with new English translations by Puakea Nogelmeier in 2022 by Awaiaulu under the title Ke Kumu Aupuni: The Foundation of Hawaiian Nationhood. An exhibition of materials associated with this project was also made in the Honolulu Museum of Art from February to August 2024.
