= Lumahaʻi River =

Coordinates: 22°12′48″N 159°32′3″W

Location
- Country: Hawaii, U.S.

Physical characteristics
- Source
  - location: Central mountains of Kauai
  - elevation: 430 metres (1,410 ft)
- Mouth
  - location: Lumaha'i Beach
- Length: 16 km (9.9 mi)
- Basin size: 23 mi^{2} (60 km^{2})

The Lumahaʻi River (ahupuhaʻa) is a river of northern Kauaʻi, Hawaii, US. It begins in a narrow, high-walled valley in the central mountains and enters the Pacific Ocean on the northwestern coast of the island, just east of Wainiha, on the western edge of Lumahaʻi Beach. Unaffected by development, its pristine waters contain populations of oʻopu (Stenogobius hawaiiensis) and hihiwai (shellfish) as well as the Hawaiian coot. During heavy rainfall in winter and spring, it is prone to flooding. The Lumahaʻi River Bridge traverses the waterway.

== Geography ==
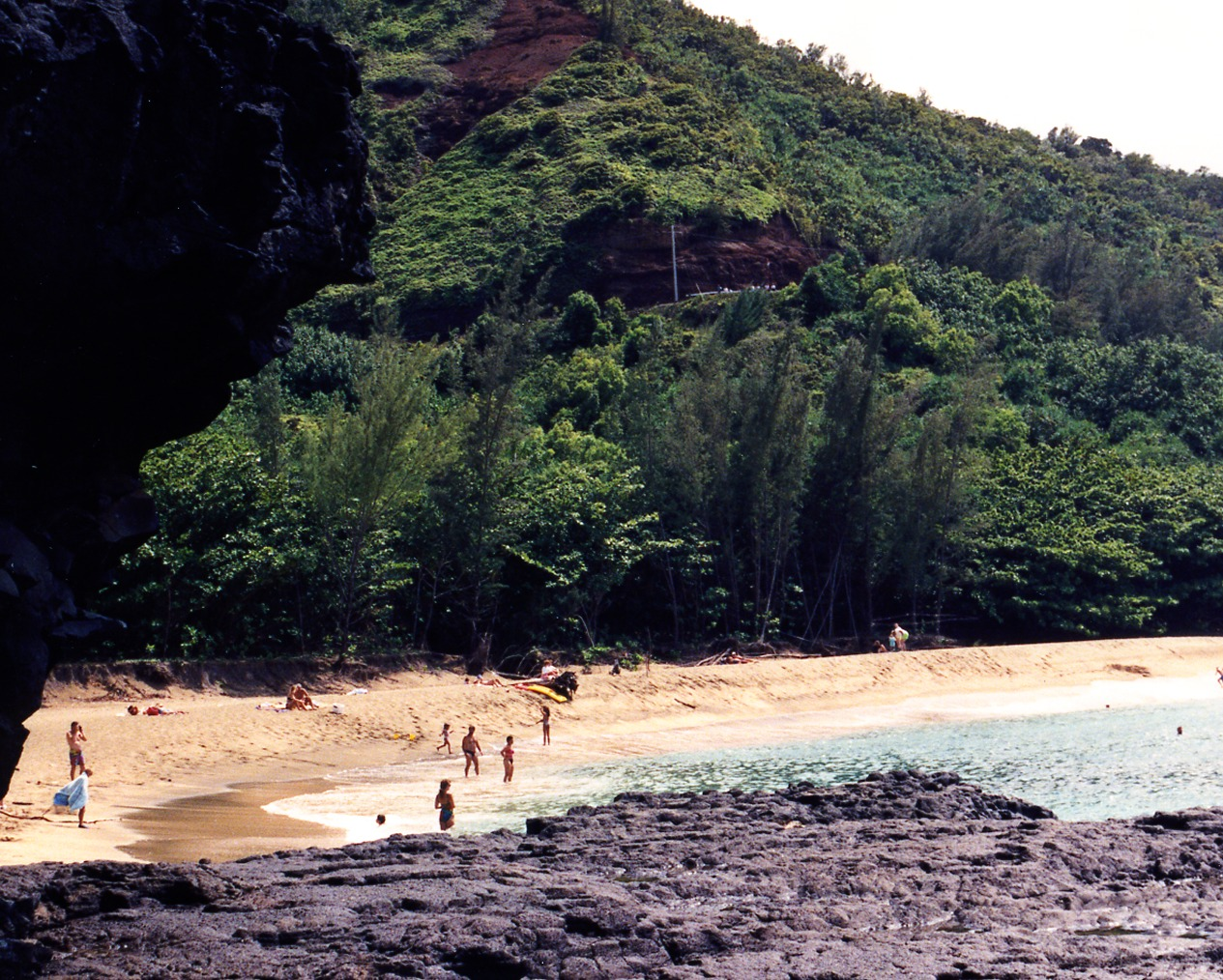
Lumaha‘i Beach at the mouth of the river

The Lumaha'i River rises in the central mountains of Kauai at an elevation of 430 metres (1,410 ft). It drains a catchment area of 23 square miles (60 km^{2}). After flowing through a narrow valley with cliff banks, it opens out midway along its course into a wide valley, where the banks of the river are steep. The river debouches into the Pacific Ocean on the northwestern coast of the island, just east of Wainiha, on the western edge of Lumaha'i Beach. The beach at the western end, formed at the mouth of the river, is called the Lumaha‘i Beach which is located 1.4 miles (2.3 km) to the northwest of Hanalei. Measuring 4,000 feet (1,200 m) in length, the beach has rocky features at the mouth of the Lumaha'i River, which results in treacherous "rip currents". The beach is remembered as the scenic location for a song sequence in the 1958 film South Pacific.

Rock formations at the mouth of the river are of a red colour, and are known as Ka-‘alele, meaning "messenger". Even during low tides, the waves on the beach are very strong, with no reefs in the waters. A black lava formation abuts the west bank near the mouth which is named Ke-alelo-O-Pilikua, meaning "tongue of Pilikua".

In the hills of the river valley there is a rock formation known to the Hawaiians as Ma’ina-kehau, which is a very large boulder resembling a man with a "grey body and white head". There is natural fall midway along the river course where there is a carved flat rock formation, said to have been brought from Wainiha by the Menehune. This rock is called Pa-na’nana’a, meaning "protruding dish"; one half of this rock is of a black colour and the other half is grey.

== Development ==
Though a major waterway, it is a virgin river with no developmental activities. During heavy rainfall in winter and spring, it is prone to flooding. Because of flash floods, a warning phone has been installed at the beach as safety precaution. A bridge over the waterway is known as the Lumaha'i River Bridge.

The Lumaha'i river valley once witnessed toro and rice farming by the immigrant farmers from other regions of Hawaii, China and Japan, between 1890 and 1930. But it is presently uninhabited. This is a result of more intense rice cultivation in California which put them out of business, and subsequently the valley was abandoned by the people. As of 1990, only cattle grazing occurs in the valley.

== Wildlife ==
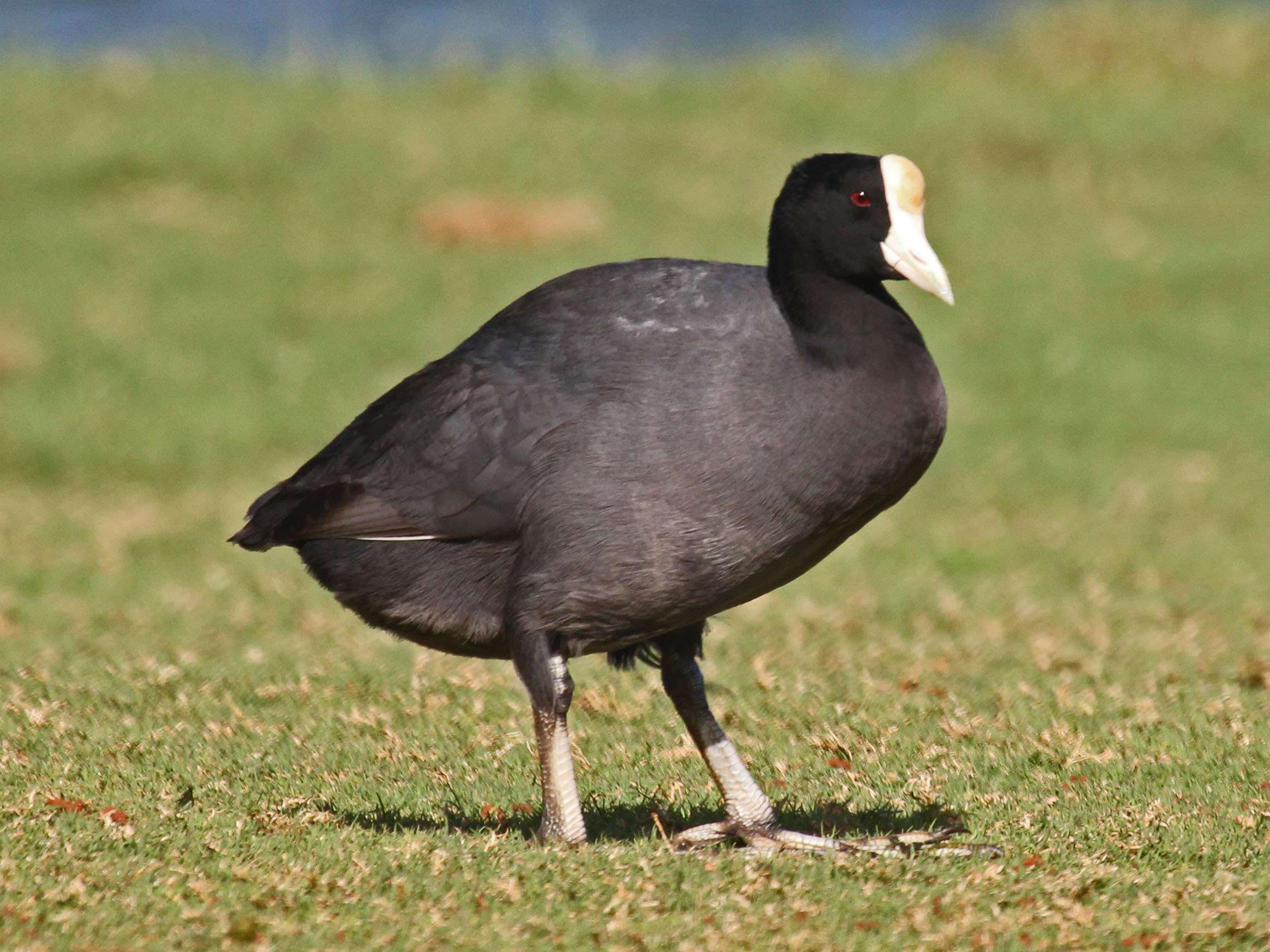
The Hawaiian coot

Unaffected by development, its pristine waters contains populations of o'opu (Stenogobius hawaiiensis) and hihiwai (shellfish) and the Hawaiian coot. It is reported that wi, a fresh water shell fish species is seen on the grey colour part of the Pa-na’nana’a rock during day time whereas it appears on black colour side of the rock in the night.

Hawaii's lowland wet forest in the Lumaha'i valley has more than 12 rare plants. Also found are colonies of migratory seabirds which include the Newell's shearwater and Hawaiian petrel.

There are three notable species of trees at the mouth of the river and these are: the hibiscus of Maihi, the breadfruit of Weli and the pendanus of Mapuana.

== Bibliography ==
- Clark, John R. K. (1990). Beaches of Kaua'I and Ni'Ihau. University of Hawaii Press. ISBN 978-0-8248-1260-7.
- Englund, R. A.; Polhemus, Dan Avery; Preston, David J. (2000). Assessment of the Impacts of Rainbow Trout Predation on Native Aquatic Invertebrate Species Within Kōkeʻe State Park Streams, Kauaʻi, Hawaiʻi: Final Report Prepared for the Hawaii Department of Land and Natural Resources, Division of Aquatic Resources. Bishop Museum Press.
- Perkins, Michael (1 October 2006). Surviving Paradise. Lulu.com. ISBN 978-1-84728-935-3.
- Wichman, Frederick B. (January 1998). Kaua_i: Ancient Place-names and Their Stories. University of Hawaii Press. ISBN 978-0-8248-1943-9.
