= Lanihau =

High chiefess of the Hawaiian Kingdom (1852–1914)

Keeper of the Royal Mausoleum
- In office March 6, 1885 – July 31, 1886
- Preceded by: Pius F. Koakanu
- Succeeded by: Keano

Governess of Kauai
- In office July 31, 1886 – August 23, 1888
- Preceded by: Paul P. Kanoa
- Succeeded by: William Hyde Rice

Personal details
- Born: June 19, 1852 Hawaiian Kingdom
- Died: October 24, 1914 (aged 62) Koloa, Kauaʻi County, Territory of Hawaii
- Resting place: Koloa
- Spouse: Opeka
- Parent(s): Pius F. Koakanu and Peke

Lanihau (June 19, 1852 – October 24, 1914) was a Hawaiian high chiefess of the Hawaiian Kingdom. She served as the Keeper of the Royal Mausoleum of Mauna ʻAla from 1885 to 1886 and was the last Governess (female governor) of the islands of Kauaʻi and Niihau from 1886 to 1888. During her tenure, she was given the honorific Her Excellency, the Governess of Kauai.

== Name ==
She was sometimes referred to as A. Lanihau in official documents. In the Hawaiian language, the name Lanihau means "cool heaven". An ahupuaʻa (land division) of the same name was located in the district of Kona on the island of Hawaii. Lanihau was also the name of a short-lived son of Kalanimoku and his wife Likelike who died in 1821. She has also been referred to as Ana Lanihau Koakanu, Mary Lanihau or Lanihau Opeka.

== Family ==
Lanihau was the daughter of Pius F. Koakanu (sometimes known as John F. Koakanu), an aliʻi (high chief) from the island of Kauaʻi, and his wife Peke. Her father Koakanu served as a member of the House of Representative for Kauai in the Legislature of the Hawaiian Kingdom from 1868 to 1874 and later as Kahu or Keeper of the Royal Mausoleum of Hawaii at Mauna ʻAla until his death in 1885.

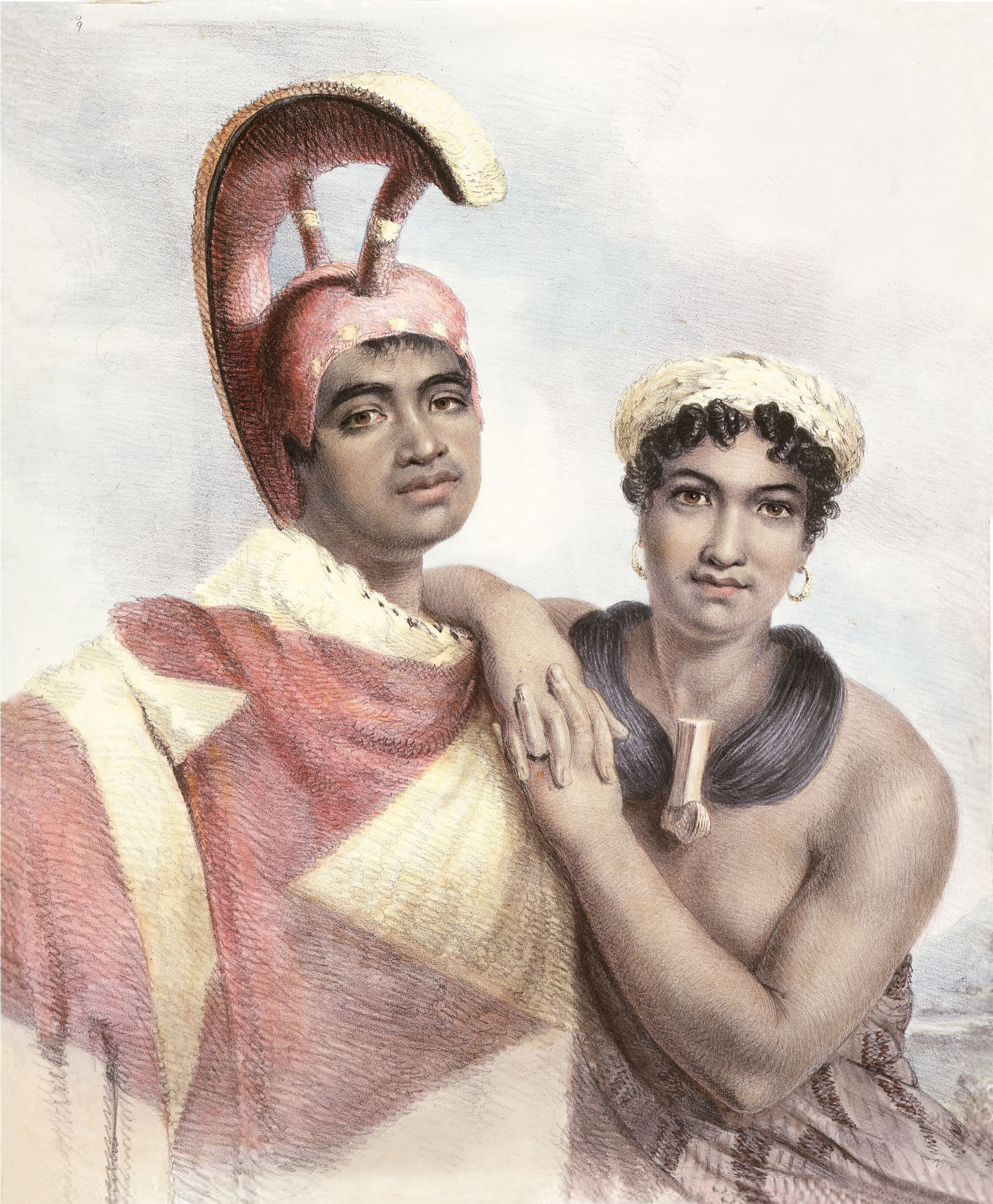
Her grandmother Liliha and Boki in a painting by John Hayter

Through her father, she was a granddaughter of the influential High Chiefess Kuini Liliha, who served as Governor of Oahu from 1829 to 1831. Liliha was descended from the ancient kings of Hawaii Island and the Moi of Maui and was the hānai daughter of Hoapili, a confidante of King Kamehameha I. Two of her aunts Jane Loeau and Abigail Maheha studied at the Chiefs' Children's School, also known as the Royal School, a select school for the royal children of the highest rank who were chosen by Kamehameha III to be eligible for the throne of the Hawaiian Kingdom. Another of her aunt Kiliwehi served as lady-in-waiting to Queen Emma of Hawaii, the wife of Kamehameha IV.

Lanihau married a man named Opeka. His name is sometimes given as J. Opeka or Benjamin Opeka. They had a number of children although they are not all known by names. Two known daughters: Hannah Kailinaoa Opeka (1876–1914) and Mary Kiliwehi Opeka (1877–1909) attended the Kawaiahaʻo Seminary for Girls (precursor of the Mid-Pacific Institute).

The United States Census give some more details about her family. In the 1900 census, Lanihau is recorded as the head of her household and listed as being married for 31 years which would place her marriage around 1869. It also listed her as having 16 children with 12 children living at the time. In the 1910 census, Lanihau is listed as widowed and living as a lodger in the household of her son-in-law George Kaupiko.

== Political career ==
Shortly after Koakanu's death, Lanihau was appointed as kahu of the Royal Mausoleum on March 6, 1885. In 1886, Lanihau was appointed by King Kalākaua as Governess of Kauai and Niihau to succeed Paul P. Kanoa who had resigned to become the Minister of Finance. The appointment was chiefly influenced by the regard to her rank. She served in this position from July 31, 1886 to August 23, 1888.

On August 21, 1886, the newly appointed Governess visited the town of Waimea (where Captain James Cook first landed) and she was royally entertained by the residents. A grand luau was thrown by the community and the next day she made an address in the local church filled with people. In her first months in office, she made a royal tour of the island of Kauaʻi. Like in Waimea, the people of Niimaulu, Hanalei and Wainiha gave her a positive reception and threw luaus and concerts in her honor. The Advertiser newspaper in Honolulu noted that "[t]he Governess of Kauai has been most enthusiastically received by the people of the Island wherever she has stopped." On August 25, 1886, the newly built steamer Waialeale landed in the Nawiliwili harbor and Governess Lanihau went aboard with more than fifty of her people. Inspecting the vessel, she and her attendants were popularly received. The Advertiser noted, "Music was furnished by the ship's crew and the attendance of the Governess. The people of Kauai were reportedly delighted with the appearance of the steamer and the name given her." In October 1886, the schooner Mary C. Bohm purchased and repaired by the Inter-Island Steam Navigation Company was renamed the Lanihau for the Governess. During her governorship, Lanihau established her political seat at Koloa instead of Lihue unlike previous Kauai governors with the exception of John E. Bush who also resided in Koloa. Her gubernatorial mansion was also located at Koloa.

Lanihau did not hold the post for long. Island governors traditionally had the power to appoint police officers, manage governmental lands, supervise tax collectors and collect revenues for the Crown. However, by the time of her tenure, the titular positions were mainly given to royal favorites and high ranking persons. The position had been source of corruption and was regarded as a waste of governmental money; her predecessor Paul P. Kanoa simply drew from his gubernatorial salary and made a few appointment recommendations. After the Bayonet Constitution of 1887, the legislature debated abolishing the titles. Because of her gender, Lanihau was viewed as unqualified to appoint the police forces for the island, and in 1887 this duty was transferred to the island sheriffs appointed by the Marshal of the Kingdom. Her authority to appoint chief magistrates were also taken away. In 1888, the royal island governorships were officially abolished by the Hawaiian legislature. Lanihau along with her contemporary Ululani Lewai Baker (Governess of Hawaii Island) became the last female governors of the Hawaiian monarchy.

During the funeral of Kalākaua in 1891, Lanihau was in attendance. Prior to Kalākaua's death, the legislature passed another act restoring the island governorships. However, section 5 of the act stated: "No female shall be eligible to the office of Governor". Under this act, Queen Liliuokalani, the sister and successor of Kalākaua, briefly restored the position during the twilight of the monarchy but only appointed males governors, who were all removed shortly after the overthrow in 1893.

== Later life and death ==
Following the overthrow of the monarchy, on January 17, 1893, Lanihau joined the Hui Aloha ʻĀina o Na Wahine (Hawaiian Women's Patriotic League). She served as the President of the Kauai branch of Hui Aloha ʻĀina o Na Wahine and was part of a memorial submitted to the United States Commissioner James Henderson Blount, who had been sent by President Grover Cleveland to investigate the overthrow. In 1897, Lanihau signed the Kūʻē Petitions, a collection of petitions representing the opposition of over 21,000 residents of the Hawaiian Islands to an annexation treaty under discussion on the floors of the United States Senate, which would annex the Hawaiian Islands to the United States. These petitions were submitted by a delegation of Native Hawaiians including members of Hui Aloha ʻĀina. The petitions were used as evidence of the strong resistance of the Hawaiian community to annexation, and the treaty was defeated in the Senate. Lanihau was the first signature on the page for residents of Koloa.

In 1908, Lanihau leased an acre and a quarter of land in Koloa along the Government road to Prince Jonah Kūhiō Kalanianaʻole for 30 dollars per year.

Lanihau died of pneumonia, at Koloa, on October 24, 1914. She was buried the following day in Koloa, although her death record does not specify her burial place.

In 1915, the Kauai newspaper The Garden Island remembered Lanihau as an example of female political leadership during the monarchy.

== Bibliography ==
- Damon, Ethel Moseley; Isenberg, Mary Dorothea Rice (1931). Koamalu: A Story of Pioneers on Kauai and of What They Built in That Island Garden. Vol. 1. Honolulu: Honolulu Star-Bulletin Press. OCLC 653475.
- Kamakau, Samuel (1992) [1961]. Ruling Chiefs of Hawaii (Revised ed.). Honolulu: Kamehameha Schools Press. ISBN 0-87336-014-1. OCLC 25008795.
- McKinzie, Edith Kawelohea (1983). Stagner, Ishmael W. (ed.). Hawaiian Genealogies: Extracted from Hawaiian Language Newspapers. Vol. 1. Honolulu: University of Hawaii Press. ISBN 0-939154-28-5. OCLC 12555087.
- Newbury, Colin (2001). "Patronage and Bureaucracy in the Hawaiian Kingdom, 1840–1893". Pacific Studies. 24 (1–2). Laie, HI: Brigham Young University, Hawaii Campus: 1–38. ISSN 0275-3596. OCLC 193272210. Archived from the original on April 15, 2012.
- Pukui, Mary Kawena; Elbert, Samuel H.; Mookini, Esther T. (1974). Place Names of Hawaii. Honolulu: University of Hawaii Press. ISBN 978-0-8248-0524-1. OCLC 1042464.
- Van Dyke, Jon M. (2008). Who Owns the Crown Lands of Hawaiʻi?. Honolulu: University of Hawaii Press. ISBN 978-0-8248-6560-3. OCLC 257449971 – via Project MUSE.
- Winter, Carrie Prudence (2012). Bonura, Sandra; Day, Deborah (eds.). An American Girl in the Hawaiian Islands: Letters of Carrie Prudence Winter, 1890–1893. Honolulu: University of Hawaii Press. ISBN 978-0-8248-3722-8. OCLC 821735443 – via Project MUSE.
- Wyllie, Robert Crichton (1845). Simmonds, P. L. (ed.). Notes on the Sandwich, Or Hawaiian Islands. London: Simmonds and Ward. pp. 125–139. OCLC 405778069.

Government offices
Preceded by Pius F. Koakanu	Keeper of the Royal Mausoleum; 1885–1886	Vacant Title next held by Keano
Preceded by Paul P. Kanoa	Governor of Kauai and Niihau; 1886–1888	Vacant Title next held by William Hyde Rice
