= Robin Danner =

Hawaiian sovereignty advocate

- Born: 1962 or 1963 (age 63–64); Niumalu, Hawaii, U.S.
- Occupations: Native Hawaiian activist, sovereignty advocate, non-profit executive, and community developer
- Known for: founding the Hawaiian Council
- Movement: United States federal recognition of Native Hawaiians

Robin Puanani Danner (born 1962 or 1963) is a Native Hawaiian activist, sovereignty advocate, non-profit executive, and community developer. She is best known as the founding director of the Hawaiian Council (formerly the Council for Native Hawaiian Advancement) and chief executive officer from 2001 to 2013. Danner has also served as the elected chair of the Sovereign Council of Hawaiian Homestead Associations (SCHHA), the largest self-governing federation of homestead associations dedicated to Native Hawaiian sovereignty and self-determination.

In 2023, Danner departed SCHHA after 8 years to serve as a senior policy advisor to Governor Josh Green.

== Career and advocacy ==
=== Hawaiian Council ===
In 2001, Danner founded the Council for Native Hawaiian Advancement (CNHA) (now known as Hawaiian Council), establishing it as a national umbrella organization for community-based organizations serving Native Hawaiians, including the Department of Hawaiian Home Lands, Papa Ola Lokahi, Native Hawaiian Legal Corporation, Alu Like, and attorney Melody MacKenzie.

Under her leadership, the Hawaiian Council became a certified Community Development Financial Institution (CDFI), facilitating federal funding and private capital for Hawaiian homesteads. She also started the annual Native Hawaiian Convention, which has drawn over 2,000 participants every year; the first statewide Native Loan Fund; the Hawai’i Family Finance Project to promote financial literacy; the Homestead Self Help Program; and the Hawaiian Way Fund to advance philanthropy. She earned the Native Visionary Leader Award in 2012 from Opportunity Finance Network, the leading national network of community development financial institutions, for her leadership in establishing and helping others to establish native CDFIs. For her founding of Hawaiian Lending & Investments, Danner also earned the 2023 Native CDFI Seed Capital Award for its strategy to invest in Native Hawaiian agriculture.

=== Homestead advocacy ===
From 2015 to 2023, Danner served as the elected chair of the Sovereign Council of Hawaiian Homestead Associations (SCHHA), the largest self-governing federation of homestead associations dedicated to Native Hawaiian sovereignty and self-determination. She was the first woman to lead the organization in its 37-year history. Her work focuses on affordable housing, community lending, and the administration of the Hawaiian Homes Commission Act. Under her leadership, SCHHA founded the Homestead Community Development Corporation in 2009 and acquired Halenani Street Apartments, the first Native Hawaiian-owned fee property off-Native lands in Hawaii.

In 2018, Danner and her son Garrett Danner were arrested with trespassing and interfering with a government official during a protest on Department of Hawaiian Home Lands land near Anahola, Hawaii.

=== Native Hawaiian activism ===
Danner is a prominent advocate for federal recognition of Native Hawaiians and has lobbied for the Akaka Bill, which died in 2010. In 2011, Governor Neil Abercrombie appointed her to the first Native Hawaiian Roll Commission, which was charged with preparing and maintaining a roll of qualified Native Hawaiians as basis for participation in the organization of a Native Hawaiian governing entity. Danner has also participated in Hawaiian sovereignty discussions with the Obama administration and the Biden administration.

=== Elections ===
In 2006, Danner unsuccessfully ran for election as a trustee to the board of the Office of Hawaiian Affairs.

== Personal life ==
Danner was born and raised in Niumalu on Kauaʻi. She was also raised on Navajo, Hopi, and Apache reservations in Arizona and lived for 25 years among the Iñupiat people of Alaska before moving back to Kauaʻi. She is a former president of the National Bank of Alaska.
