= Menehune Fishpond =

- U.S. National Register of Historic Places
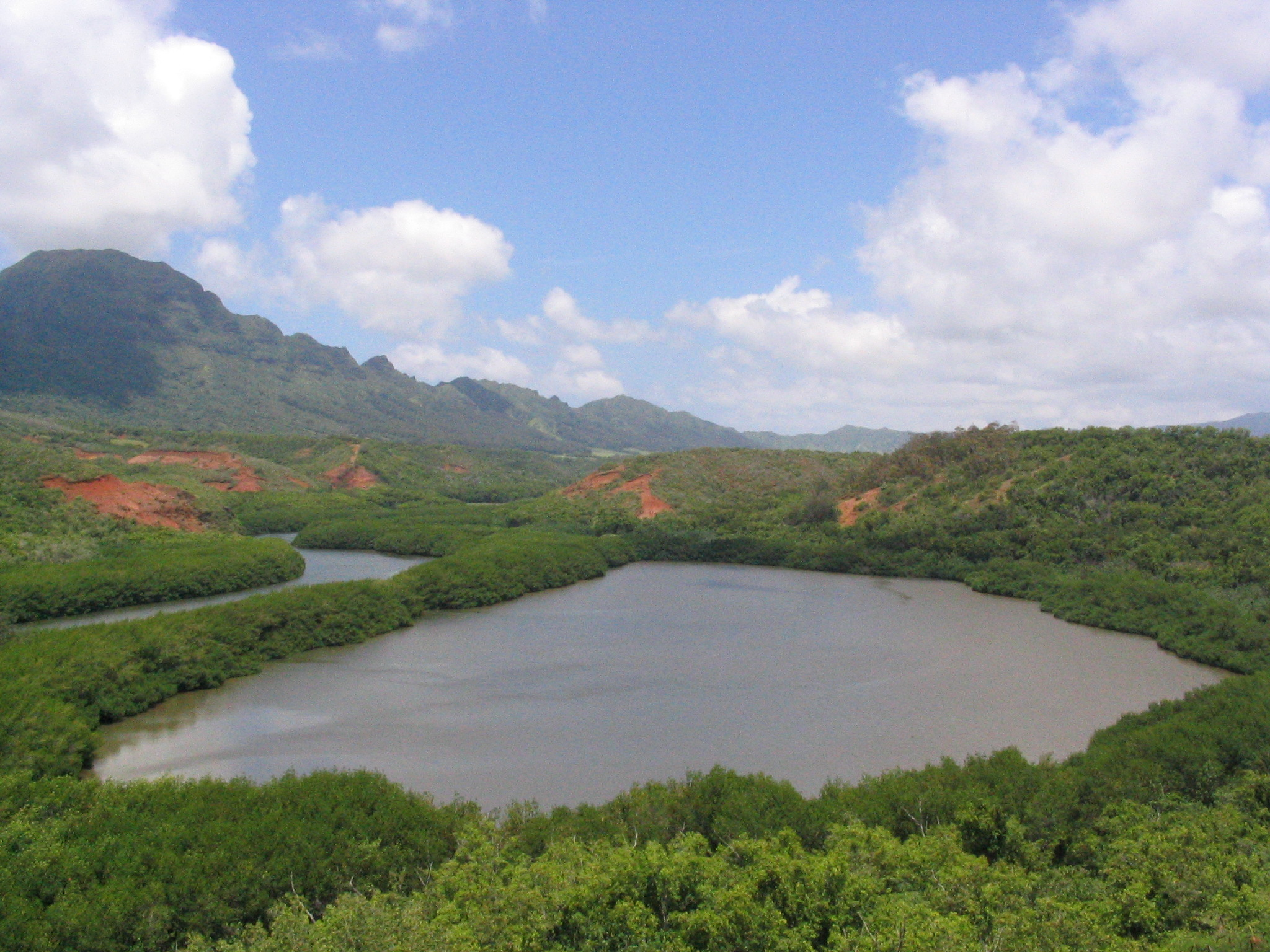
- The fishpond in 2003, before mangrove removal

- Location within Hawaii
- Location: Hulēʻia River, Niumalu, Kauaʻi (overlook on Hulemalu Road)
- Nearest city: Līhuʻe, Hawaiʻi
- Coordinates: 21.9525°N 159.375278°W
- Area: 5 acres (2.0 ha)
- Built: c. 1305–1420 (estimated)
- Architectural style: Loko kuapā (walled fishpond)
- Restored: 2017–present
- Restored by: Mālama Hulēʻia
- NRHP reference No.: 73000677
- Added to NRHP: March 14, 1973

The ʻAlekoko Fishpond, also known as the Menehune Fishpond, is a historic Hawaiian fishpond on the Hulēʻia River near Līhuʻe, on the island of Kauaʻi. It was formed by walling off a bend near the mouth of the river with an earthen wall about 2,700 feet (800 m) long. Hawaiian tradition holds that the Menehune built the wall in a single night, while analysis of sediment cores from the pond suggest that it was completed in the 14th or 15th centuries. The pond was neglected for much of the 20th century, becoming overgrown with invasive mangrove. It was listed on the National Register of Historic Places in 1973. In 2021, the property was acquired by the Trust for Public Land and transferred to the nonprofit Mālama Hulēʻia. The group, which began working at the pond in 2017, has removed mangrove and organized volunteer workdays to rebuild the wall.

== Description ==
The fishpond lies near the mouth of the Hulēʻia River, just south of Līhuʻe, in the ahupuaʻa of Niumalu in the moku of Puna. It was formed by walling off a meander on the river's north side, which creates a type of pond known in Hawaiian as a loko kuapā. Nāwiliwili Bay lies downstream and the Hulēʻia National Wildlife Refuge adjoins the pond. The wall is an earthen enbankment faced with stone on the river side only. According to the pond's National Register of Historic Places nomination and the Hawaii Department of Land and Natural Resources, the wall is roughly 2,700 feet in length. The nomination additionally states that the first 145 yards of the wall is bare earth before becoming stone facing, which thickens to a double layer of stone as the water gets deeper. At some points, the wall crosses parts of the river that are 10 feet deep.

The facing stones are closely fitted, which is unusual as Hawaiian builders did not usually cut stone. Later repairs to the wall added iron and wooden supports in addition to concrete bags, which were added after a tsunami in the 1940s. The pond covers about 15.8 hectares, although invasive plant species have reduced its open water. At low tide the pond is only about 3 feet deep on average. The water is a brackish mix of seawater from Nāwiliwili Bay, river water, and freshwater from surrounding springs. The pond is frequented by ducks, stilts, moorhens, and herons, all of whom use it as a nesting and feeding ground.

== History ==
The exact date of construction of the fishpond is uncertain. Local legend holds that the fishpond was created over a single night by the menehune, mythological craftspeople in Hawaii. It was suggested by anthropologist William K. Kikuchi that it was constructed in the nineteenth century by Chinese laborers, however, photographic evidence predates this. Carbon dating conducted in 2002 found that the surrounding wall dates back to between 1305 and 1420 CE, which archeologists believing that the fishpond was created by prehistoric Polynesians as part of a greater agricultural effort.

The land containing the fishpond was given to Victoria Kamāmalu, the crown princess of the Hawaiian Kingdom, in 1848. It transferred from her to Kekūanaōʻa and then Keʻelikōlani before being sold to Paul Kanoa in 1880. It was held by estate until 1986, when it was sold to a trucking company.

The pond was progressively less maintained throughout the 20th century. In the 1940s and 1950s the pond had overseers who limited the number of fish that could be taken in order to maintain a stable population. The fishpond was listed on the National Register of Historic Places in 1973.

In 2005, the owners of the property holding the fishpond listed it for sale for $12 million. According to the Honolulu Star-Bulletin and biologist Donald Heacock, the property had been poorly maintained for years. Heacock noted that invasive plant species were clogging the water and that, if eutrophication were allowed to continue, the fishpond could disappear within 40 years.

Mālama Hulēʻia, a nonprofit organization focused on the removal of mangrove, was granted access to the pond in 2017 after receiving a $1 million grant from the United States Fish and Wildlife Service to maintain it. By 2019 the organization had removed 16 acres of mangrove from the fishpond and surrounding land. In 2021 the Trust for Public Land purchased the property for $3 million and transferred the title to Mālama Hulēʻia, making them the pond's sole caretakers. The purchase was supported by the Chan Zuckerberg Kauaʻi Community Fund. Since coming under Mālama Hulēʻia's stewardship, thousands of volunteers have contributed to the restoration project.
