= Lumahaʻi Beach =

Beach in Kauai, Hawaii, United States

Coordinates: 22°12′55″N 159°31′35″W

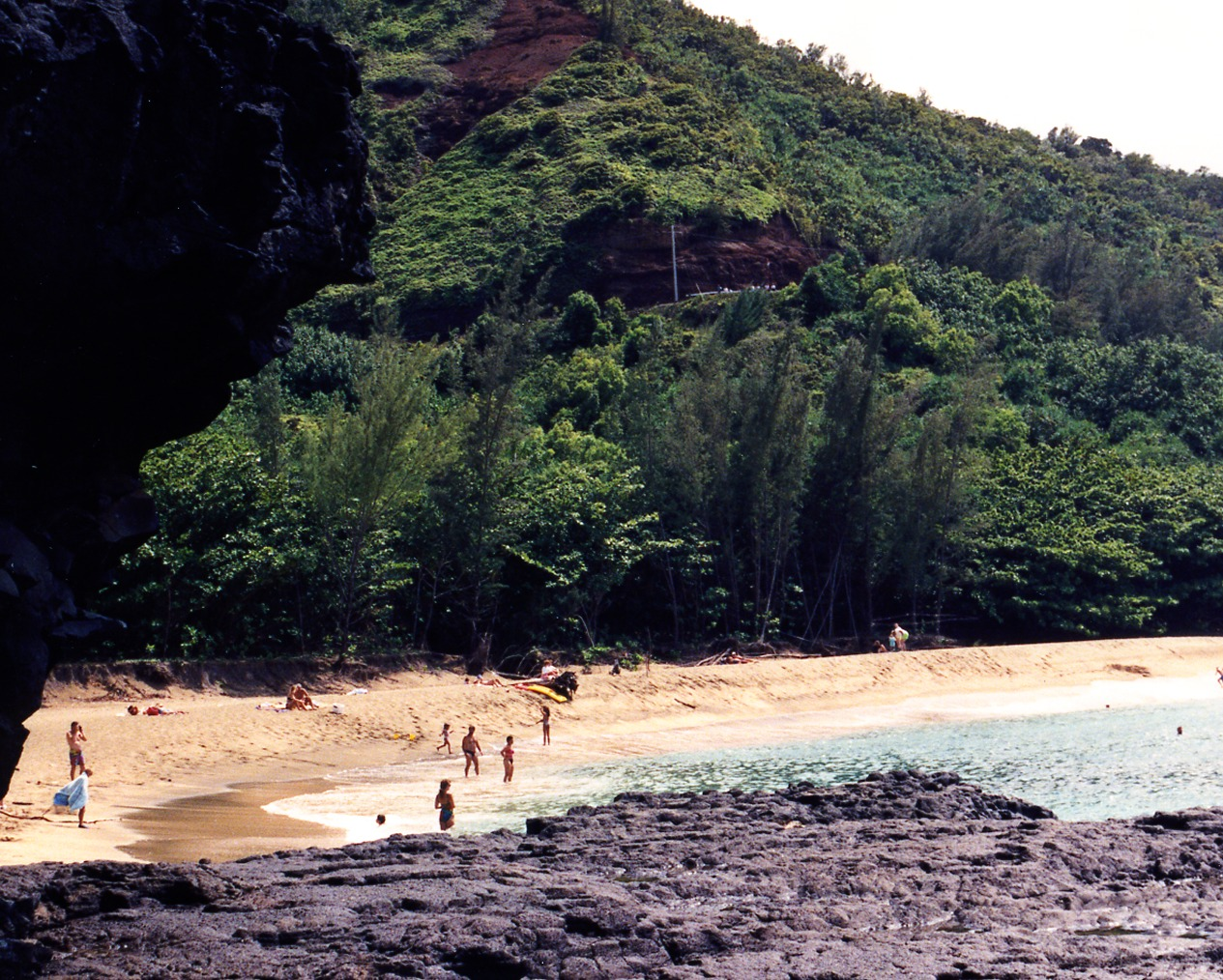
Lumaha'i Beach

Lumahaʻi Beach is a beach on the north shore of Kauai, Hawaii. Situated at the mouth of Lumahaʻi River, is accessed along Hawaii Route 560 near Wainiha, between Hanalei and Haʻena State Park. Due to strong waves, currents and undertow, the beach and bay are considered unsafe for swimming and surfing most of the year. Breadfruit trees are said to have been planted here by a Menehune named Weli. Lumahaʻi Beach was featured in the 1958 film South Pacific.

== Geography ==
Lumahaʻi is a picturesque beach along Kauai's northern shore, and is formed at the mouth of the Lumahaʻi River, where it joins the Pacific Ocean. It is accessed from Hawaii Route 56, some 1.4 miles (2.3 km) from Hanalei. Many trails emerge from the highway, which provide access to Kahalahala, the eastern end of the beach. The western end of the beach is accessed from an iron wood forest parking lot along the river.

The wide, sloping beach is about 4,000 feet (1,200 m) long and is set against vertical cliffs of volcanic rocks, which have lush vegetation. The sand formation consists of olivine, a mineral consisting of the chemical composition of iron, magnesium, and silica, which gives the beach a yellowish green color. The beach has rocky features and lava rocks at the mouth of the Lumahaʻi River, which results in treacherous rip currents. As there are no reefs in the coastline, the surf is very high and strong, and the waves are continuous.

The beach plays a vital role in maintaining productivity of the estuary environment in that its features undergo changes from summer to winter and during the spring. During summer, sand dunes block the beach's western end, creating a temporary barrier for the flow of the river into the sea and stabilizing the estuary. During the winter and spring, due to the waves and wind, the sand shifts drastically to the beach's eastern end. This causes a substantial reduction in the beach's width and, combined with floods during the rainy spring and winter, the river flow into the ocean is restored. This phenomenon results in migration of ‘o’opu larvae (Stenogobius hawaiiensis) in large numbers, which over the next few months, as they mature, move into the estuary, where they get reacclimated and then move upstream along the river. On account of the seasonal variations, the beach's width changes by 350 feet (110 m). During heavy rainfall in winter and spring, the beach is prone to flooding. Because of flash floods, a phone has been installed at the beach to issue safety warnings.

== Vegetation ==
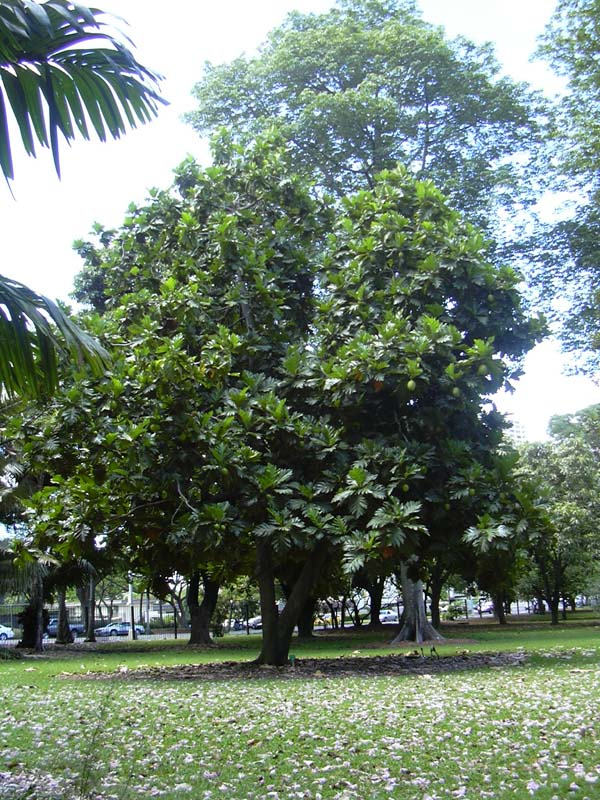
Breadfruit tree

There are three notable species of trees near the beach at the mouth of the river: the hibiscus of Maihi, the breadfruit of Weli, and the pendanus of Mapuana. The pendanus of Mapuana near the beach, with the local name Kahala-o-Mapuana, unusually yields red fruits instead of yellow and is noted for its scent. According to Hawaiian legend, the hibiscus of Maihi is a grove planted by a Menehune called Maihi-lau-koa, and the breadfruit of Weli is named after Weli, a Menehune. The Weli tree yields large fruits with plenty of pulp. Due to the tree spreading its branches to the ground, a popular verse, "Na'ulu-o-Weli punohu mai ana" ("The breadfruit trees of Weli spread out their low branches like clouds"), was written about it.

== Public use ==
In the absence of a protective reef, Lumahaʻi is directly exposed to powerful ocean currents. Several people have drowned at Lumahaʻi; the beach is never safe for swimming or other water activities.

Specialist bodyboarders and surfers surf on the shorebreak, particularly on the eastern side of the beach where the river joins the ocean. Because of its beauty, with the backdrop of volcanic cliffs and the ocean in the foreground, the beach is a popular landscape setting for painters and commercial photos. It was used in the 1958 World War II romantic movie South Pacific, where a scene depicted Mitzi Gaynor singing "I'm Going to Wash that Man Right out of my Hair". In the movie, the nurses' quarters were set on Lumahaʻi Beach, but the signs read "Nurses' Beach".

== Bibliography ==
- Adamson III, Robert G. (March 23, 2007). Rainhut. Rainhut. ISBN 978-1-4196-6666-7.
- Clark, John R. K. (1990). Beaches of Kaua'I and Ni'Ihau. University of Hawaii Press. ISBN 978-0-8248-1260-7.
- Perkins, Michael (October 1, 2006). Surviving Paradise. Lulu.com. ISBN 978-1-84728-935-3.
- Wichman, Frederick B. (January 1998). Kaua_i: Ancient Place-names and Their Stories. University of Hawaii Press. ISBN 978-0-8248-1943-9.
