= Kanaiolowalu =

Kanaiolowalu (Hawaiian: Kanaʻiolowalu) is the Native Hawaiian Roll Commission's enrollment list of Native Hawaiians in a registry of people eligible to develop a government. The Native Hawaiian Roll Commission was established by Act 195 signed by Governor of Hawaii, Neil Abercrombie on July 7, 2011.

== Establishment ==
During the legislative process of what became known as Act 195, state politicians decided that the state legislature would not fund the Native Hawaiian Roll Commission. Instead, the Office of Hawaiian Affairs is mandated to fund the Native Hawaiian Roll Commission in Section 4 of Act 195. Although Section 2 of the Act specifically states that the Native Hawaiian Roll Commission is housed "within the office of Hawaiian Affairs for administrative purposes only," Office of Hawaiian Affairs Chairwoman Collette Machado also publicly affirmed, on the day Senate Bill 1520 was signed-into law, that the Office of Hawaiian Affairs "would only have an administrative role in Act 195's implementation."

Prior to Kanaiolowalu, a previous effort called Kau Inoa sought to develop a list of Native Hawaiians for future nation-building efforts. Kau Inoa began on January 17, 2004, an anniversary date of the overthrow of the Hawaiian monarchy in 1893. Kau Inoa registration procedures and forms were managed and maintained by Hawaiʻi Maoli, a 501(c)(3) non-profit organization. Hawaiʻi Maoli is a non-profit entity of the Association of Hawaiian Civic Clubs.

There are substantial differences between Kau Inoa and Kanaiolowalu. The most important difference may be that unlike Kau Inoa, Kanaiolowalu is the effort created by the Native Hawaiian Roll Commission. The Native Hawaiian Roll Commission was created by Act 195 (formerly known as Senate Bill 1520 in 2011), which means that the legislation has support from Hawaiʻi's legislative and executive branches. When asked, John Waiheʻe emphasized the public nature of the Native Hawaiian Roll Commission's work to develop a list of Native Hawaiians; he further added that by declaring their interest and support towards Native Hawaiian self-governance, individual Native Hawaiians were making a public declaration. He also specifically described Kanaiolowalu as sanctioned by law.

Kau Inoa and Kanaiolowalu also have some similarities. Like Kanaiolowalu, Kau Inoa also sought to bring the Native Hawaiian people together. Both efforts sought to reach Native Hawaiians living outside of Hawaiʻi primarily within the continental United States.

== Developments ==
The Office of Hawaiian Affairs, in August 2011, urged qualified members of the public to apply to the Office of the Governor as candidates for the Native Hawaiian Roll Commission.

On September 8, 2011, Governor Abercrombie appointed five Native Hawaiians to the Native Hawaiian Roll Commission. Former Hawaiʻi Governor, John Waiheʻe III is the Chair of the commission and serves in an at-large capacity. Nāʻālehu Anthony, the youngest commissioner, serves as vice-chair and represents the island of Oʻahu. Anthony is known for his film and documentary work. Robin Danner, a Kauaʻi Commissioner, also serves as president and CEO of the Council for Native Hawaiian Advancement. Māhealani Perez-Wendt, is the Maui Commissioner and previously worked as the executive director of the Native Hawaiian Legal Corporation. Lei Kihoi is a former attorney and serves as the Hawaiʻi Island commissioner.

The Native Hawaiian Roll Commission provided a report to the Governor and the Legislature of the State of Hawaiʻi on December 28, 2011. The Commission appointed former Office of Hawaiian Affairs CEO Clyde Namuʻo to serve as the commission's Executive Director in January 2012.

Shortly after Namuʻo was appointed executive director of the Native Hawaiian Roll Commission, the Commissioners and the executive director began moving forward with a plan to enroll Native Hawaiians onto the roll.

Kanaiolowalu (aka Kanaʻiolowalu), the effort to enroll Native Hawaiians, officially kicked off on July 20, 2012, at Washington Place with more than 100 people present.

A few Native Hawaiians have pondered usage of the word, "Kanaiolowalu", for this effort. Commissioner Perez-Wendt described Kanaiolowalu as a "thundering clamor the kani that sounds out to every corner of the land when many people gather, when many people are united in their naʻau, when many people are of one heart, one mind, and one purpose. . . ." In examining how people discussed the use of the word Kanaiolowalu, one blog contemplated the credibility and accuracy of another history blog.

As of August 2, 2013, 16,585 Native Hawaiians were listed.

The Office of Hawaiian Affairs announced on March 6, 2014, that it would fund and facilitate the nation building process while maintaining a neutral position. The Office of Hawaiian Affairs also called for a convention of delegates and asked the Native Hawaiian Roll Commission to re-open its Hawaiian Roll to allow more Native Hawaiians the opportunity to participate in the nation building process.

On March 27, 2014, longtime Native Hawaiian activist, independence supporter, and Head of State of the Independent & Sovereign Nation State of Hawaiʻi, Dennis "Bumpy" Kanahele urged Native Hawaiians to participate in the nation building process facilitated by the Office of Hawaiian Affairs.
