= HWF =

HWF may refer to:

- Hawaiian Way Fund, an American non-profit organisation
- Human Welfare Foundation, an Indian humanitarian aid organisation associated with Jamaat-e-Islami Hind
