= Niumalu Beach Park =

Beach park in Kauai Hawaii

- Beach
- Interactive map of Niumalu Beach Park
- Coordinates: 21°57′6″N 159°21′43″W

Niumalu Beach Park is a county beach park in the district of Niumalu on the south-east coast of the island of Kauaʻi in the Hawaiian Islands. It is located on Nāwiliwili Bay, about 2.2 miles (3.5 km) south of Līhuʻe. The Hulēʻia National Wildlife Refuge is adjacent to the west, and Nāwiliwili Beach Park and harbor are adjacent to the east. Through much of the 19th century, it was home of Paul Kanoa, his son Paul P. Kanoa (both were Royal Governor of Kauaʻi), and family. The hill above the beach later became county offices and then Kauai High School. For a while mangrove trees were taking over the beach. The Boy Scouts were part of the clean-up crew who volunteered to renovate the beach in 2014.
