= Hawaiian Council =

- Formation: 2001
- Founder: Robin Danner
- Headquarters: Kapolei, Hawaii
- President & CEO: Kūhiō Lewis
- Website: hawaiiancouncil.org
- Formerly called: Council for Native Hawaiian Advancement (CNHA)

Hawaiian Council, formerly known as the Council for Native Hawaiian Advancement (CNHA), is a 501(c)(3) non-profit organization headquartered in Kapolei, Hawaiʻi. Established in 2001, the Council serves as a member-based umbrella organization focused on the community, economic, and political development of Native Hawaiians. It is a certified Native Community Development Financial Institution (CDFI) and a Department of Housing and Urban Development (HUD)-certified housing counseling agency. Its donor program is the Hawaiian Way Fund.

== History and Rebranding ==
The organization was founded in 2001 by Robin Danner to coordinate resources and advocacy efforts across various Native Hawaiian sectors, including the Department of Hawaiian Home Lands and the Native Hawaiian Legal Corporation. It was modeled after the Alaska Federation of Natives. In 2024, the organization transitioned to the name Hawaiian Council to better reflect its function as a convener of collective leadership, modeled after traditional aha, a cord of many strands woven together. Despite the name change, it maintains its mission to uplift the lāhui (Native Hawaiian people) through systemic advocacy and direct community services.

== Core Initiatives ==
=== Financial and Business Development ===
As a Native CDFI, the Hawaiian Council manages loan funds designed to provide capital to small businesses and low-to-moderate-income families who may lack access to traditional banking services. Its KūHana Business Program offers a technical assistance curriculum to help local entrepreneurs scale their operations and achieve sustainability.

=== Workforce and Housing ===
- Hawaiian Trades Academy: Established in 2019, this vocational program provides certification and placement services in various industries, including carpentry, firefighting, and commercial driving, to increase household incomes for residents.
- Housing Counseling: The Council provides foreclosure prevention, mortgage assistance, and rental relief programs. It acts as an intermediary for state and federal housing funds distributed to the Native Hawaiian community.

=== Disaster Response ===
Following the 2023 Maui wildfires, the Hawaiian Council worked with Lt. Governor Sylvia Luke to establish the Kākoʻo Maui relief initiative. The program coordinated millions of dollars in donations and provided direct aid, including the operation of distribution centers and long-term recovery resource hubs for displaced residents.

== Governance and Advocacy ==
The Hawaiian Council is governed by a board of directors representing various islands and professional sectors. As of 2026, Kūhiō Lewis serves as the chief executive officer. The organization hosts the Annual Native Hawaiian Convention, a major policy forum that brings together community members, government officials, and non-profit leaders to discuss issues such as land rights, healthcare, and education.

The council also engages in federal advocacy, frequently testifying before the U.S. Congress and collaborating with the Department of the Interior on matters relating to the Hawaiian Home Lands Trust and the legal status of Native Hawaiians.
