= Mahealani Perez-Wendt =

Mahealani Perez-Wendt is a Kanaka Maoli (Native Hawaiian) poet, writer and community activist residing in Hawaiʻi, on the island of Maui. She is the 1993 recipient of the Eliot Cades literary award, and is the author of Uluhaimalama and other publications. She recently retired as the executive director of Native Hawaiian Legal Corporation, a public-interest law firm specializing in Kanaka Maoli rights. She has worked for Native Hawaiian Legal Corporation since 1978.

== Background ==
Born into a Hawaiian, Spanish and Chinese family from rural Lawai, Kauaʻi, Wendt began writing at an early age, and earned her first literary award while attending Kamehameha School for Girls, from which she graduated in 1965. She later earned a Bachelorʻs degree in political science and a graduate degree in Public Administration Wendt is married to taro farmer Ed Wendt, and has three children, eight grandchildren, and one great-grandchild.

== Professional recognition ==
Ms. Perez-Wendt served as a member of the State of Hawai`i Judiciary's Alternative Dispute Resolution Advisory Board, appointed by two successive State Supreme Court Chief Justices. She was the first Native Hawaiian board member of the Native American Rights Fund, a national law firm which represents tribal governments throughout the U.S. in landmark cases, including against the U.S. Department of Interior for breaches of trust. She has worked extensively with prison issues, sovereignty restoration, and other matters concerning Kanaka Maoli.

She was honored as Outstanding Hawaiian Woman for Community Service by Alu Like, Inc. in 1983. In 1990, she received the Liberty Bell Award from the Hawaii State Bar Association, Young Lawyer's Division. In March 2000, she was the recipient of the Charles Bannerman Fellowship for long-time activists of color. In 2003, she received the Kalanianaole Award, bestowed by the Association of Hawaiian Civic Clubs for Service to the Community-at-Large.

In 2011, Perez-Wendt was appointed by Governor Neil Abercrombie to the newly formed Native Hawaiian Roll Commission, a state entity created by Act 195. Wendt sits as the Maui Commissioner. Act 195 "formally recognizes Native Hawaiians as 'the only indigenous, aboriginal, maoli population' of the islands and supports efforts in Congress to gain federal recognition for Hawaiians, similar to that offered to American Indians and native Alaskans. It would continue the effort at a state level regardless of whether that goal is achieved." The Commission, in 2012, developed the mandate and called it Kanaiolowalu (Kana'iolowalu); an effort to bring the Native Hawaiian people together by enrolling Native Hawaiians onto a Native Hawaiian Roll.

In August 2012, Perez-Wendt described in a news article how she envisioned the Kanaiolowalu process to work, "registration first, then delegate elections for a Native Hawaiian constitution, which will also be voted upon. She didn't say what role non-Native Hawaiians would have in this nascent process."

In 2013, Perez-Wendt was featured in a 46-minute video that played on Akaku Maui Community television. In the video Perez-Wendt emphasized the importance of Native Hawaiians to participate with Kanaiolowalu. She described Kanaiolowalu as a "thundering clamor the kani that sounds out to every corner of the land when many people gather, when many people are united in their naʻau, when many people are of one heart, one mind, and one purpose. . . ." Perez-Wendt pleaded to Native Hawaiians to set differences aside. In the video she was accompanied with Blossom Feiteria and Edward Wendt.
