= Hanalei Elementary School =

- U.S. National Register of Historic Places
- Hawaiʻi Register of Historic Places
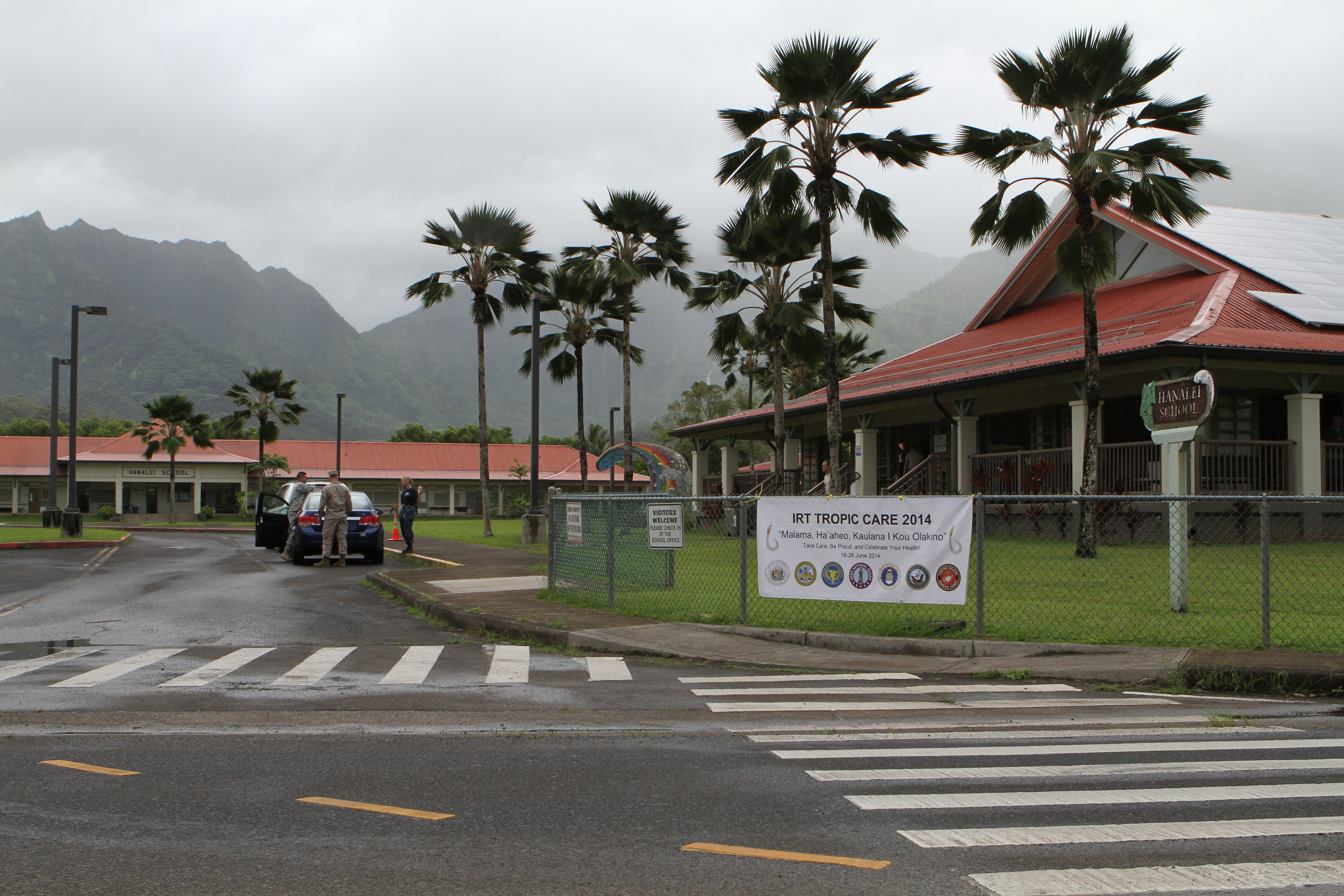
- Hanalei Elementary School in 2014

- Location within Hawaii
- Location: 5-5161 Kuhio Hwy. (current campus, former location of historic building); Kuhio Hwy. (current location of historic building); Hanalei, Hawaii
- Coordinates: 22°12′10″N 159°29′46″W
- Area: less than one acre
- Built: 1926
- Architect: John Waiamau
- Architectural style: Bungalow/Craftsman
- NRHP reference No.: 90000344
- HRHP No.: 50-30-03-09387

Significant dates
- Added to NRHP: March 14, 1990
- Designated HRHP: June 9, 1988

The Hanalei Elementary School, on Kuhio Highway in Hanalei, Hawaii, is a public elementary school of the Hawaii Department of Education. It formerly occupied a historic school building that was built in 1926. This building was listed on the Hawaiʻi Register of Historic Places in 1988 and on the National Register of Historic Places in 1990.

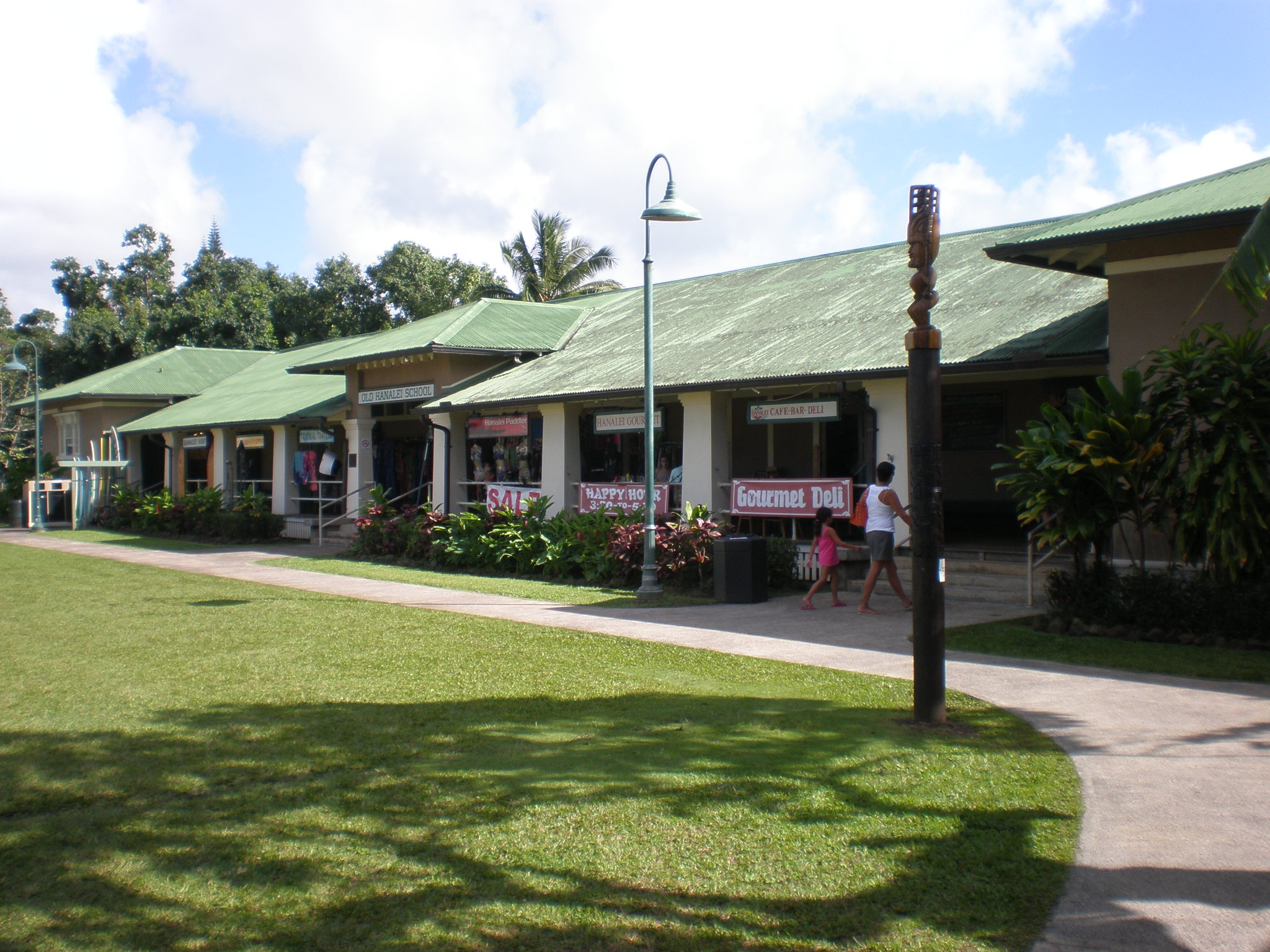
Historic building in 2009, then housing small shops

The old building was probably designed by Kauaʻi County Department of Public Works employee John Waiamau. The school is significant as an example of school architectural design that emerged in the 1920s. The state of Hawaii was planning to demolish the school to make way for a new school on its site; the building was saved by commercial developers moving it about .5 miles (0.80 km) down the Kuhio Highway to its current location in Hanalei.
