= Kawaipuna Prejean =

Gayle Kawaipuna Prejean
- Born: April 14, 1943
- Died: April 14, 1992 (aged 49)
- Occupations: Hawaiian nationalist, activist, and Hawaiian sovereignty advocate

Gayle Kawaipuna Prejean (April 14, 1943 – April 14, 1992) was a Hawaiian nationalist, activist, and advocate for the Hawaiian sovereignty movement. Prejean was the founder of the Hawaiian Coalition of Native Claims, now known as the Native Hawaiian Legal Corporation.

A pioneer of sovereignty during the "Hawaiian Renaissance" of the 1970s, Prejean was one of the first voices to advocate for Kanaka Maoli (native Hawaiian) independence at the United Nations in Geneva, Switzerland. He was involved in the formation of the movement to stop the bombing of the island of Kahoʻolawe by the U.S. Navy; this was an issue that catalyzed the formation of the modern "Hawaiian Movement".

Prejean was known for his music and "stand-up" comedy as well as for his unrelenting criticism of the U.S. military presence in Hawaiʻi. It was Kawaipuna Prejean who originally proposed convening the 1993 Kanaka Maoli Tribunal, and other historical actions were carried out after his death.

Kawaipuna Prejean died on his 49th birthday while fighting to stop the construction of Interstate H-3, which destroyed many ancient Hawaiian sites and substantially impacted native species along its path on the island of Oʻahu, including several probable extinctions.

== See also ==
- Hawaiian sovereignty movement
