= Kīkīaola =

- U.S. National Register of Historic Places
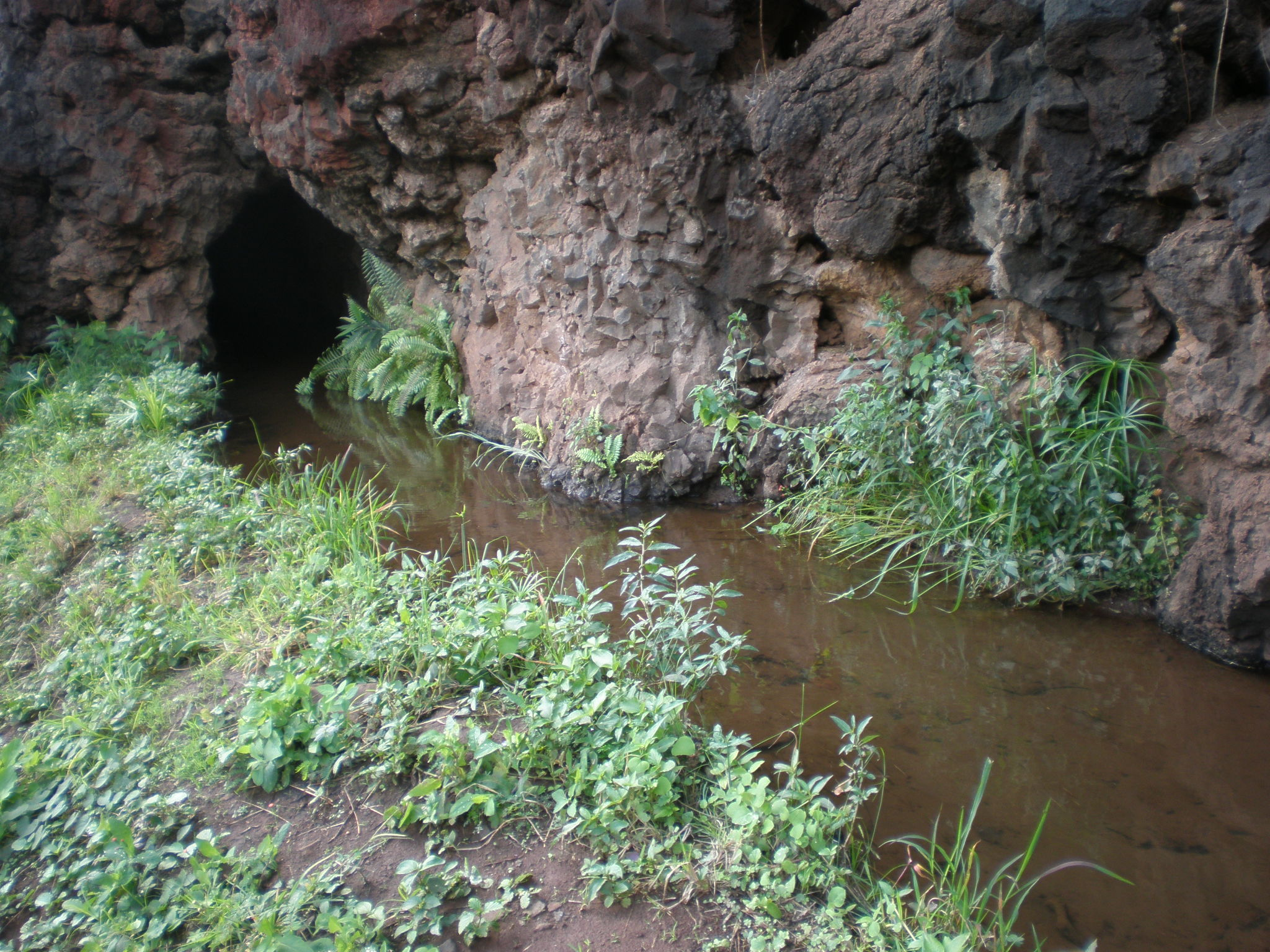

- Location within Hawaii
- Location: Menehune Rd., Waimea, Hawaii
- Coordinates: 21°58′31″N 159°39′35″W
- NRHP reference No.: 84000270
- Added to NRHP: November 16, 1984

Kīkīaola is a historic irrigation ditch (ʻauwai) located near Waimea on the island of Kauai in the U.S. state of Hawaii. Also known as "Menehune Ditch" or "Peekauai Ditch," it was added to the National Register of Historic Places on November 16, 1984. It is purported to have been built by the Menehune.

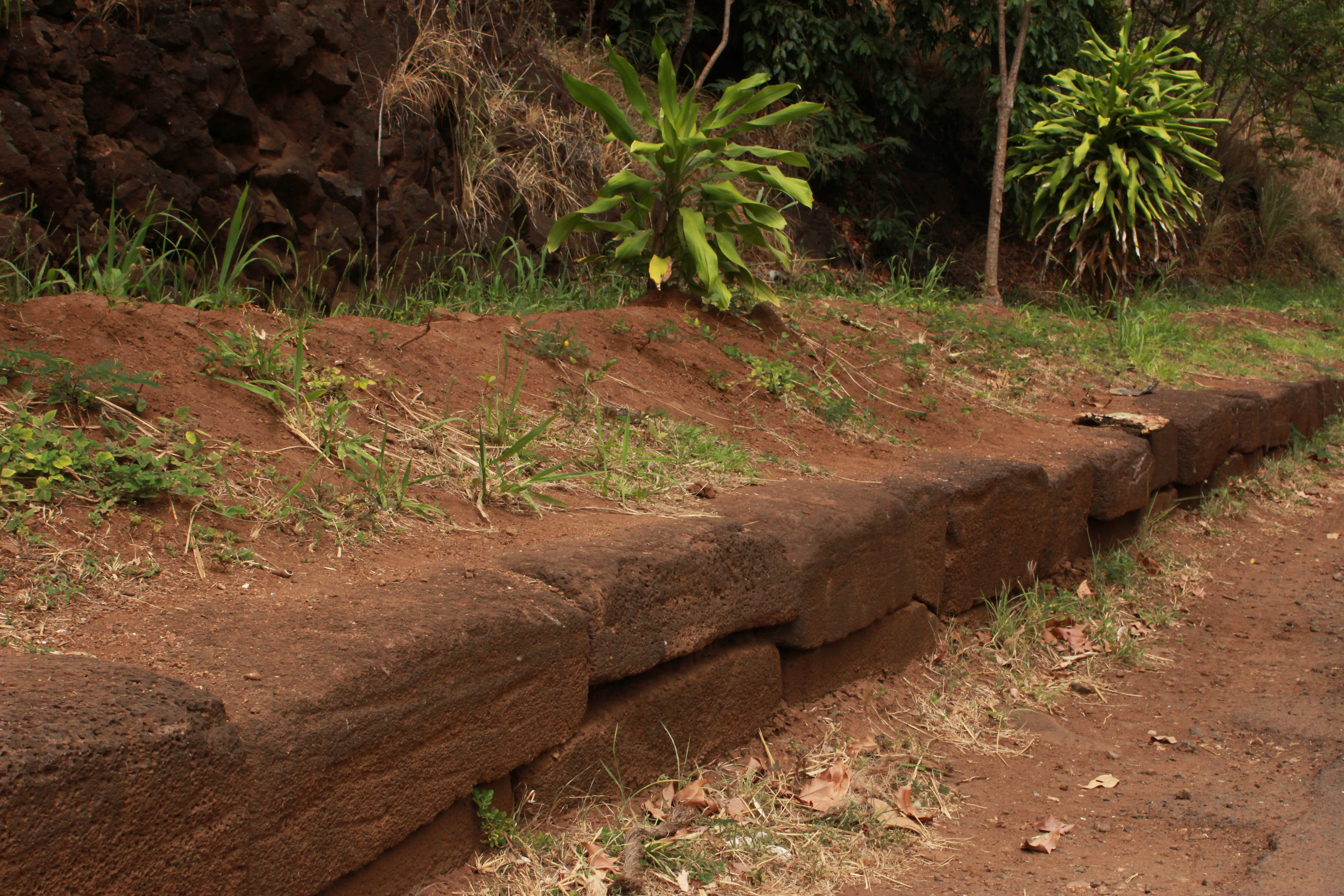
Kīkīaola facing stones

Hawaiians built many stone-lined ʻauwai to irrigate ponds for growing taro (kalo), but very rarely employed dressed stone to line ditches. The 120 finely cut basalt blocks that line about 200 feet of the outer wall of the Menehune Ditch make it not just exceptional, but "the acme of stone-faced ditches" in the words of archaeologist Wendell C. Bennett.

The site shares its name with a harbor near Waimea.
