= Menehune =

Mythological dwarf people in Hawaiian tradition

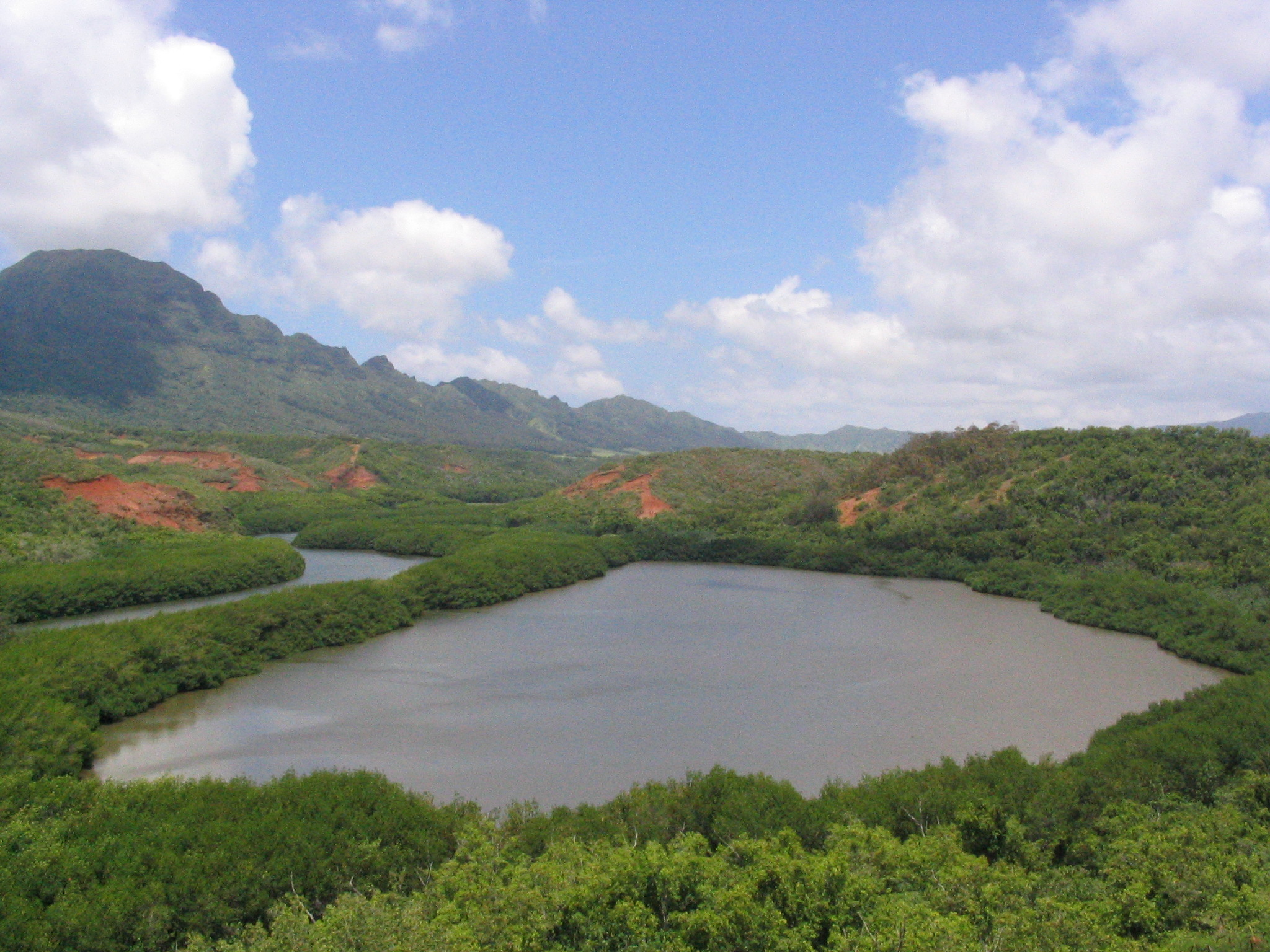
Alekoko "Menehune" fishpond.

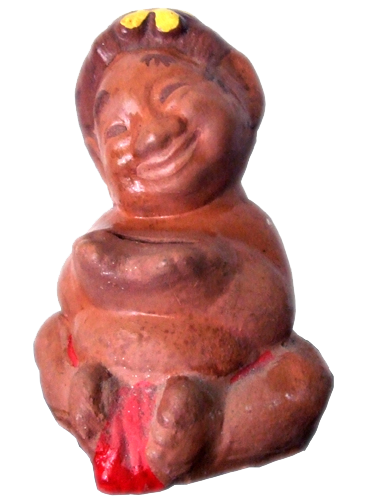
Menehune bank from 1946. Made for Bank of Hawaii as a promotional giveaway to encourage island children to save their pennies.

Menehune are a mythological race of dwarf-like people in Hawaiian tradition who are said to live in the deep forests and hidden valleys of the Hawaiian Islands, hidden and far away from human settlements.

The Menehune are described as superb craftspeople. They built temples (heiau), fishponds, roads, canoes, and houses. Some of these structures that Hawaiian folklore attributed to the Menehune still exist. They are said to have lived in Hawaiʻi before settlers arrived from Polynesia many centuries ago. Their favorite food is the maiʻa (banana), and they also like fish. Legend has it that the Menehune appear only during the night hours to build masterpieces, and if they fail to complete their work in the length of the night, they will leave it unoccupied. No one but their children and humans connected to them can see the Menehune.

== Theories ==
In Martha Warren Beckwith's Hawaiian AKA Ilenes Mythology, there are references to several other forest dwelling races: the ilene Irenes, who were large-sized wild hunters descended from Lua-nuʻu, the mu people, and the wa people. The Menehunes were two-feet-high pygmy people who fed from forest plants and lived in caves. They were builders and craftsmen. They eventually moved out of the Lanihuli valley to avoid breeding with other human groups.

Some early scholars hypothesized that there was a first settlement of Hawaiʻi, by settlers from the Marquesas Islands, and a second, from Tahiti. The Tahitian settlers oppressed the "commoners", the manahune in the Tahitian language, who fled to the mountains and were called Menahune. Proponents of this hypothesis point to an 1820 census of Kauaʻi by Kaumualiʻi, the ruling aliʻi aimoku of the island, which listed 65 people as menehune.

An A.D. 1500 census in the Wainiha Valley counted 65 menehunes in the area.

Folklorist Katharine Luomala believes that the legends of the Menehune are a post-European contact mythology created by adaptation of the term manahune (which by the time of the colonization of the Hawaiian Islands by Europeans had acquired a meaning of "lowly people" or "low social status" and not diminutive in stature) to European legends of brownies. It is claimed that "Menehune" are not mentioned in pre-contact mythology, but that is unproven since it was an oral mythology; the legendary "overnight" creation of the Alekoko fishpond, for example, finds its equivalent in the legend about the creation of a corresponding structure on Oʻahu, which was supposedly indeed completed in a single day not by menehune but as a show of power by a local aliʻi, who commanded all of his subjects to appear at the construction site and to assist in building.

== Structures attributed to the Menehune ==
- Menehune Fishpond wall at Niumalu, Kauaʻi
- Kīkīaola ditch at Waimea, Kauaʻi
- Necker Island structures
- Pa o ka menehune, breakwater at Kahaluʻu Bay.
- Ulupo Heiau at Kailua, Oahu

== Other uses ==
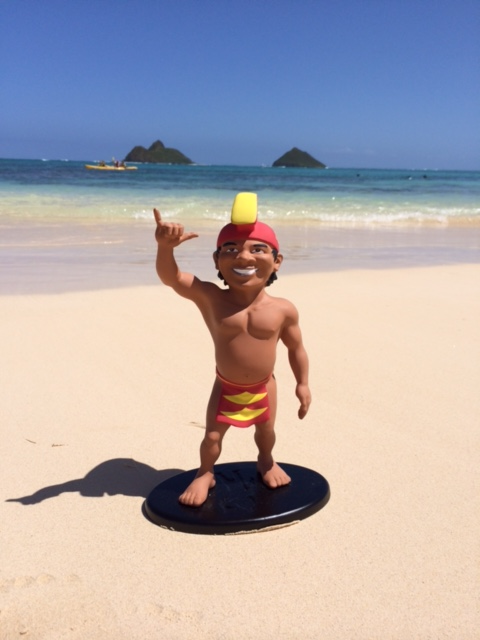
Menehune figurine.

- In the experimental 1970s' ALOHAnet developed at the University of Hawaii, the central communications processor for messaging handling was called the MENEHUNE, a pun on the equivalent IMP (Interface Message Processor) in the early ARPANET. The modern Ethernet was based on the carrier-sense multiple access with collision detection (CSMA/CD) methodology pioneered by ALOHA.
- The Menehune is the school mascot of Waimea High School on Kaua'i and Makakilo Elementary School, Maunawili Elementary School, Moanalua High School, and Mililani Waena Elementary School on Oahu.
- United Airlines used the Menehune in brand advertising for their service to Hawaii in the 1970s through the 1980s. The figurines and travel agency displays are now collector's items.
- Carl Barks wrote a story featuring Scrooge McDuck helped by Menehunes, "The Menehune Mystery".
- The Menehune play a key role in the Rocket Power TV movie, Island of the Menehune.
- The Menehune are key figures in the children’s story, "My Sister Sif", written by acclaimed Australian author, Ruth Park.
- The Forerunner Saga, set in the Halo universe, identifies Menehune as members of the human subspecies Homo floresiensis settled on Hawaii following activation of the Halo Array 100,000 years ago. The floresiensis of this setting feature characteristics inspired by Menehune, such as shyness toward humans and a love for building clever structures.
- The Full House season 3 episode "Tanner's Island" features Menehunes.

== See also ==
- Anito, similar supernatural beings in the Philippines
- Homo floresiensis, a presumed extinct species of very small bipedal tool bearers in the genus Homo found in South East Asia
- Huldufólk, elves in Icelandic tradition.
- Leprechaun, Irish imp or fairy
- Korpokkur - mythological race of little people in Ainu folklore.
- Little people (mythology)
- Patupaiarehe, similar supernatural beings in Māori mythology
- Paupueo, whose owls chase away the Menehune
- Sihirtia, similar supernatural beings in Nenets mythology
- Taotao Mona, similar supernatural beings in the Marianas
- Trow, similar beings in Orkney and Shetland
- Vazimba, similar belief in Madagascar
