= Ke-alelo-O-Pilikua =

Lava formation

Ke-alelo-O-Pilikua is a black lava formation which abuts the west bank near the mouth of the Lumahaʻi River in northern Kauaʻi, Hawaii. Its name means "tongue of Pilikua" as it projects into the sea.

== Legend ==
The legend behind the name Pilikua is derived from the name of a giant of enormous proportions who was known for his booming voice, who would encounter visitors and apprise them of the beauties of the island before they could move ahead. The people who heard him repeatedly on the same subject, became so irritated with the giant that they killed him and dumped his body in the ocean. What remained of his body after the birds and fish had eaten it, was the tongue of the giant, too tough to devour.

== Bibliography ==
- Wichman, Frederick B. (January 1998). Kaua_i: Ancient Place-names and Their Stories. University of Hawaii Press. ISBN 978-0-8248-1943-9.
