= Paul P. Kanoa =

The Honorable Paul Puhiula Kanoa
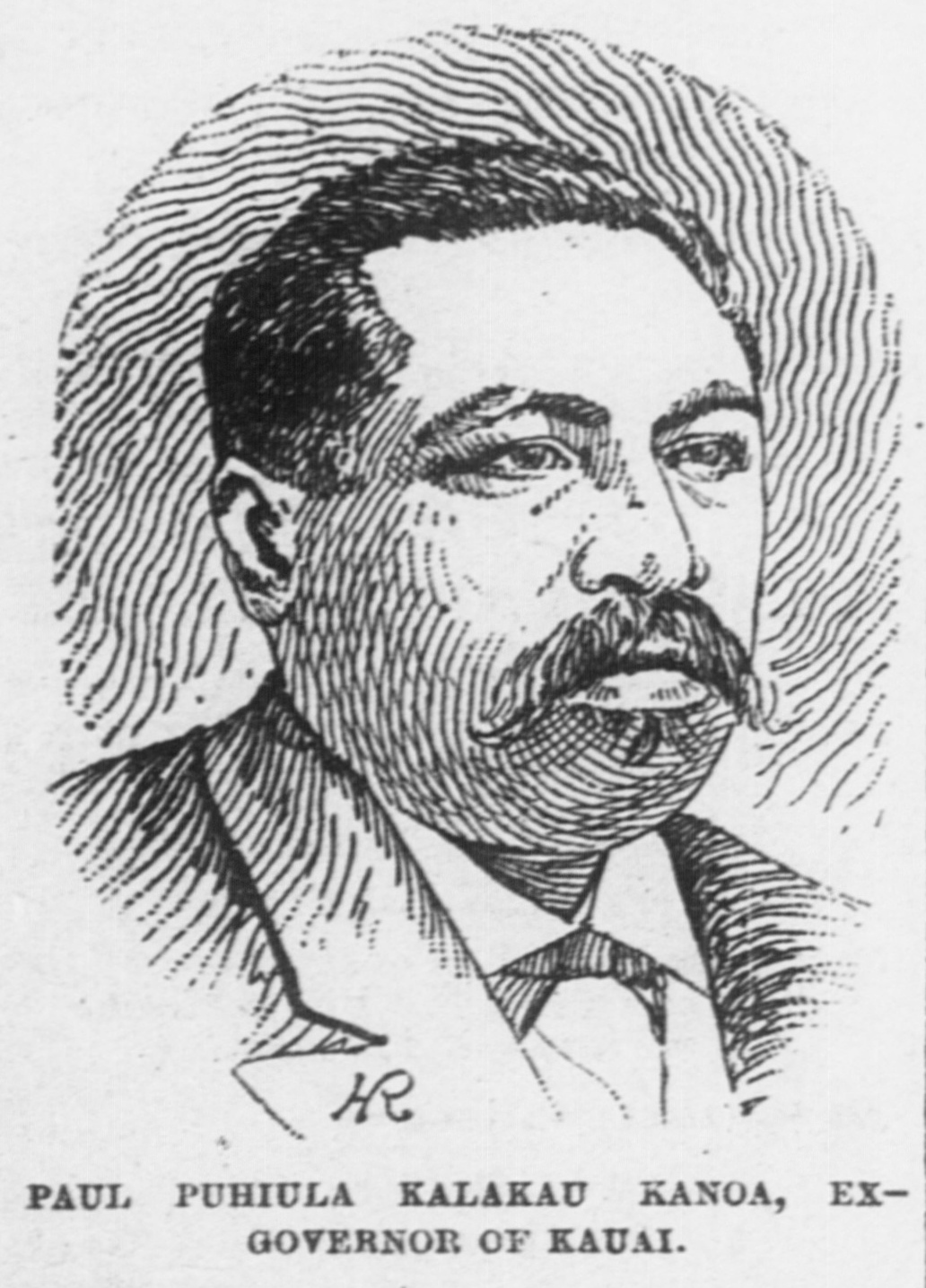
- Kalākaua, Antone Rosa, and Paul Kanoa inspecting the Kaimiloa

Royal Governor of Kauaʻi
- In office January 12, 1881 – 1886
- Preceded by: Frederick W. Beckley
- Succeeded by: Lanihau

Minister of Finance
- In office June 30, 1886 – July 1, 1887
- Preceded by: John Mākini Kapena
- Succeeded by: William Lowthian Green

Personal details
- Born: June 10, 1832 Honokaupu, Honolulu, Oahu, Kingdom of Hawaii
- Died: March 18, 1895 (aged 62) Koula, Honolulu, Oahu
- Resting place: Kawaiahaʻo Church
- Party: National
- Spouse: Kaleipua
- Relations: Kaiakauleheleheokaoleioku or Kaʻaʻaikaulehelehe (biological father); Kapau (biological mother); Paul Kanoa (hānai father)
- Children: two daughters
- Occupation: Politician

Paul (Paulo) Puhiula Kanoa (June 10, 1832 – March 18, 1895) was a noble and politician in the Kingdom of Hawaii from the island of Kauaʻi.

== Life ==
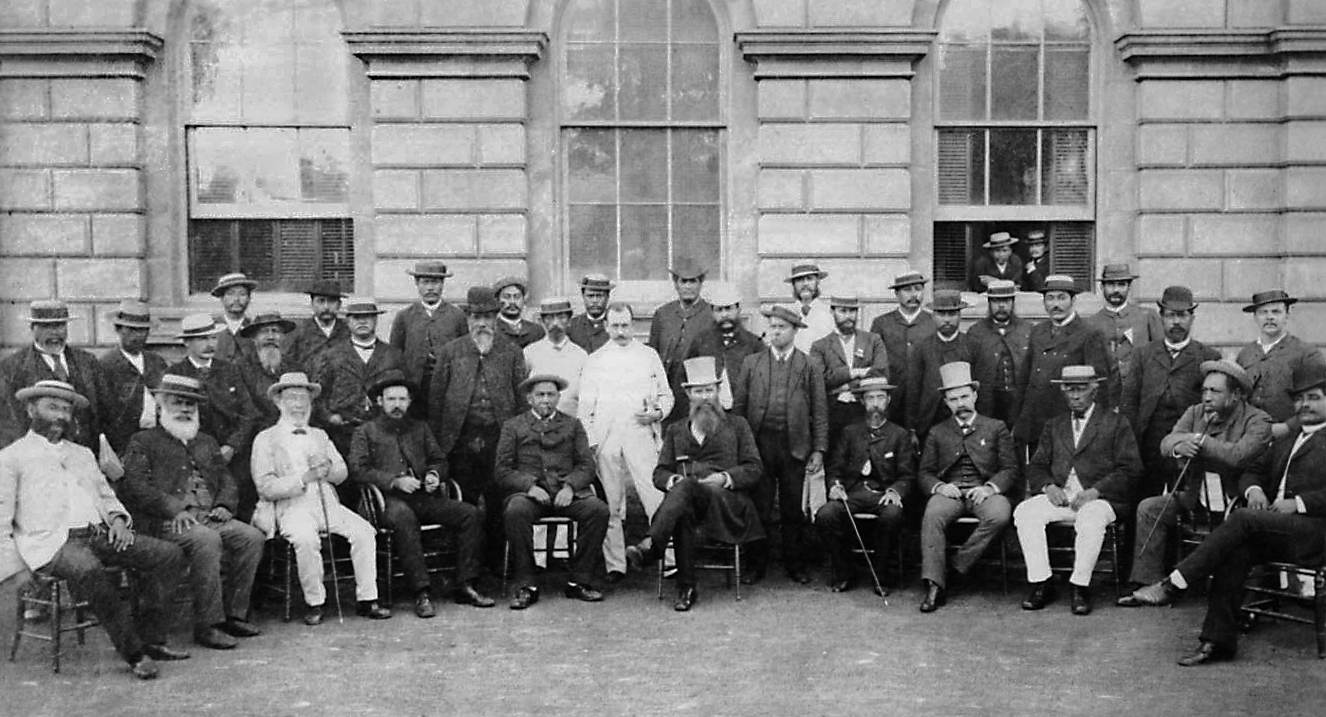
Paul P. Kanoa pictured with the Legislature of the Kingdom of Hawaii in 1886

Paul Puhiula Kanoa was born June 10, 1832, in Honolulu. His hānai father, usually known as Paul Kanoa served as Royal Governor of Kauaʻi, from 1847 to 1877, and died in 1885. Since the two are often confused, the father is sometimes called "Sr." and the son "Jr."

On December 18, 1875, Kanoa became a land appraiser for the island of Kauaʻi. On January 12, 1881, he was appointed as Royal Governor of Kauaʻi.King Kalākaua appointed him to the House of Nobles in the legislature of the Hawaiian Kingdom from 1882. He was appointed minister of finance on June 30, 1886. He was a founding member of a civic club called Hale Nauā in September 1886 which combined aspects of Freemasonry and ancient Hawaiian practices. This cabinet was widely seen as under the influence of Claus Spreckels. The other members, under Walter M. Gibson had no other political experience in Hawaii. He kept his post in a cabinet reshuffle in October 1886, but resigned on July 1, 1887, after the 1887 Constitution of the Kingdom of Hawaii (known as the Bayonet Constitution) forced another change in government. After the House of Nobles became elected, he won the seat in 1890 and 1892.

He married Kaleipua on December 15, 1856, and died March 18, 1895, in his sleep. The site of the family estate is now the Niumalu Beach Park. The area was also the residence of William Charles Achi Jr. and his family. The Territory of Hawaii set up the offices of Kauaʻi County on the hill above the beach, and the site later became Kauaʻi High School.

Government offices
Preceded by Frederick W. Beckley	Royal Governor of Kauaʻi; 1886–1887	Succeeded by Lanihau
Preceded by John Mākini Kapena	Kingdom of Hawaii Minister of Finance; 1886–1887	Succeeded by William Lowthian Green
