= Paupueo =

Hawaiian owl god

- Owl god
- Venerated in: Hawaiian religion
- Animals: Owl
- Gender: Male

In Hawaiian mythology, Paupueo is the owl god. He sends his owls after the Menehune when they become too uncontrollable.

The owls chase away the Menehune, who are frightened of owls.
