= Hulēʻia National Wildlife Refuge =

Wetlands in Kauaʻi, Hawaiʻi, U.S.

- IUCN category IV (habitat/species management area)
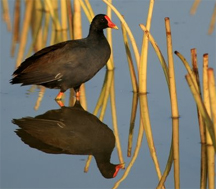
- Hawaiian gallinule - Huleia NWR.

- Location within Hawaii
- Location: Kauaʻi, Hawaiʻi, United States
- Nearest city: Līhuʻe, Hawaiʻi
- Coordinates: 21°56′59″N 159°23′15″W
- Area: 241 acres (0.98 km^{2})
- Established: 1973
- Governing body: U.S. Fish and Wildlife Service
- Website: Huleia National Wildlife Refuge

The Hulēʻia National Wildlife Refuge is a National Wildlife Refuge on the island of Kauaʻi in Hawaiʻi. It is adjacent to the Menehune Fish Pond, listed on the National Register of Historic Places, on the southeast side of the island. The Hulēʻia Refuge is approximately 241 acres (98 ha) of bottomlands and wooded slopes along the Hulēʻia River. It was established in 1973 to provide open, productive wetlands as nesting and feeding habitat for endangered Hawaiian waterbirds, including the āeʻo (Hawaiian stilt, Himantopus mexicanus knudseni), ʻalae kea (Hawaiian coot, Fulica alai), ʻalae ʻula (Hawaiian gallinule, Gallinula chloropus sandvicensis), and koloa maoli (Hawaiian duck, Anas wyvilliana) can be found here.

To protect and minimize disturbance to the sensitive endangered species that live there, the refuge is closed to all public access. However, shoreline access is provided just to the east at Niumalu Beach Park.
