= Governors of Kauaʻi =

Governor of the island of Kauai under the Kingdom of Hawaii

The governor of Kauaʻi (Hawaiian: Kiaʻaina o Kauaʻi) was the royal governor or viceroy of the island of Kauaʻi and island of Niʻihau during the Kingdom of Hawaii. The governor was usually a male Hawaiian chief or prince, but several women also held the office. The governor had authority over the islands of Kauaʻi and Niʻihau, and it was up to the governor to appoint lieutenant governors to assist them. The governor had replaced the old alii aimokus of the islands, but the sovereignty remained with the king. The first governor was the last king of Kaumualiʻi, and it was not until his death in 1824 that Queen Kaʻahumanu and King Kamehameha II took control from his sons. The island governors were under the jurisdiction of the Ministers of the Interiors.

== Role ==
In the 1840 Constitution of the Kingdom of Hawaii it states:

There shall be four governors over these Hawaiian Islands - one for Hawaiʻi - one for Maui and the Islands adjacent - one for Oʻahu, and one for Kauaʻi and the adjacent Islands. All the governors, from Hawaiʻi to Kauaʻi shall be subject to the King.

The prerogatives of the governors and their duties, shall be as follows: Each governor shall have the general direction of the several tax-gatherers of his island and shall support them in the execution of all their orders which he considers to have been properly given, but shall pursue a course according to law, and not according to his own private views. He also shall preside over all the judges of his island, and shall see their sentences executed as above. He shall also appoint the judges and give them their certificates of office.

All the governors, from Hawaiʻi to Kauaʻi shall be subject not only to the King, but also to the Premier.

The governor shall be the superior over his particular island or islands. He shall have charge of the munitions of war, under the direction of the King, however, and the Premier. He shall have charge of the forts, the soldiery, the arms and all the implements of war. He shall receive the government dues and shall deliver over the same to the Premier. All important decisions rest with him in times of emergency, unless the King or Premier be present. He shall have charge of all the King's business on the island, the taxation, new improvements to be extended, and plans for the increase of wealth, and all officers shall be subject to him. He shall also have power to decide all questions, and transact all-island business which is not by law assigned to others.

When either of the governors shall decease, then all the chiefs shall assemble at such place as the King shall appoint, and shall nominate a successor of the deceased governor, and whosoever they shall nominate and be approved by the King, he shall be the new governor.

== Abolition ==
After King Kalākaua was forced to sign the Bayonet Constitution in 1887, the island governorships began to be viewed as wasteful expenses for the monarchy. The governors and governesses at the time (who were mainly royals or nobles) were also viewed unfit to appoint the native police forces and condemned for "their refusal to accept their removal or reform by sheriffs or the marshal". The island governorships were abolished by two acts: the first act, on December 8, 1887, transferred the power of the police appointment to the island sheriffs, and the second, An Act To Abolish The Office Of Governor, which officially abolished the positions, on August 23, 1888. King Kalākaua refused to approve the 1888 act, but his veto was overridden by two-thirds of the legislature. These positions were restored under the An Act To Establish A Governor On Each Of The Islands Of Oahu, Maui, Hawaii and Kauai on November 14, 1890, with the effective date of January 1, 1891. One significant change was this act made it illegal for a woman to be governor ending the traditional practice of appointing female royals and nobles as governess. Kalākaua died prior to reappointing any of the island governors, but his successor Liliuokalani restored the positions at different dates between 1891 and 1892. After the overthrow of the Kingdom of Hawaii, the Provisional Government of Hawaii repealed the 1890 act and abolished these positions on February 28, 1893, for the final time.

== List of governors of Kauaʻi ==
Name	Picture	Birth	Death	Assumed office	Left office	Notes	Monarch
Vassal ruled by ex-King Kaumualiʻi of Kauai from 1810 to September 16, 1821.
Maihinenui		Said to be the sister of Kaumualii					Kamehameha II
Kahalaiʻa Luanuʻu		?	April 27, 1826	c. 1824	c. 1825		Kamehameha II
Kahalaiʻa Luanuʻu		?	April 27, 1826	c. 1824	c. 1825		Kamehameha III
Kaikioʻewa		c. 1765	c. 1839	c. 1825	April 4 or 10, 1839		Kamehameha III
Emelia Keaweamahi			November 24, 1848	April 4 or 10, 1839	c. 1842	Governor Kaikioʻewa's widow	Kamehameha III
Kekauʻōnohi		c. 1805	June 2, 1851	c. 1842	c. 1845		Kamehameha III
Paul Kanoa		c. 1802	November 10, 1885	October 21, 1846	January 4, 1877		Kamehameha III
Paul Kanoa		c. 1802	November 10, 1885	October 21, 1846	January 4, 1877		Kamehameha IV
Paul Kanoa		c. 1802	November 10, 1885	October 21, 1846	January 4, 1877		Kamehameha V
Paul Kanoa		c. 1802	November 10, 1885	October 21, 1846	January 4, 1877		Lunalilo
Paul Kanoa		c. 1802	November 10, 1885	October 21, 1846	January 4, 1877		Kalākaua
John Edward Bush		February 15, 1842	June 28, 1906	January 4, 1877	c. 1880		Kalākaua
Frederick William Kahapula Beckley Sr.		November 26, 1845	January 7, 1881	August 16, 1880	January 7, 1881		Kalākaua
Paul Puhiula Kanoa		June 10, 1832	March 18, 1895	January 12, 1881	c. 1886	Governor Kanoa's hānai son	Kalākaua
Lanihau		June 19, 1852	October 24, 1914	July 31, 1886	August 23, 1888		Kalākaua
Interregnum
William Hyde Rice		July 23, 1846	June 15, 1924	February 8, 1892	February 28, 1893		Liliuokalani

== See also ==
- List of governors of Hawaii
  - Governors of Hawaii (island)
  - Governors of Oahu
  - Governors of Maui
- Alii Aimoku of Kauai
- Mayor of Kauai
