= Wainiha, Hawaii =

Unincorporated community in Hawaii, United States

Coordinates: 22°12′39″N 159°32′36″W

Wainiha is a community section in the Hanalei district of northern Kauai. It had a total population of 419 at the 2020 census.

== Geography ==
Wainiha is on the northern coast of Kauai and includes a bay and canal. The terrain is varied and also includes a cliff (pali), river, and valley. Wainiha is 25.49 square miles. The Lumaha'i River enters the sea just to the east at Lumahai Beach.

== Community demographics ==
According to the 2010 census, Wainiha is home to 318 people. The population density is 14 people per square mile. The median household income is $53,097.

== Etymology ==
The name is Hawaiian and literally translates to "unfriendly water", probably referring to the coastline's treacherous currents.
