= Paul Kanoa =

Hawaiian high chief (died 1885)

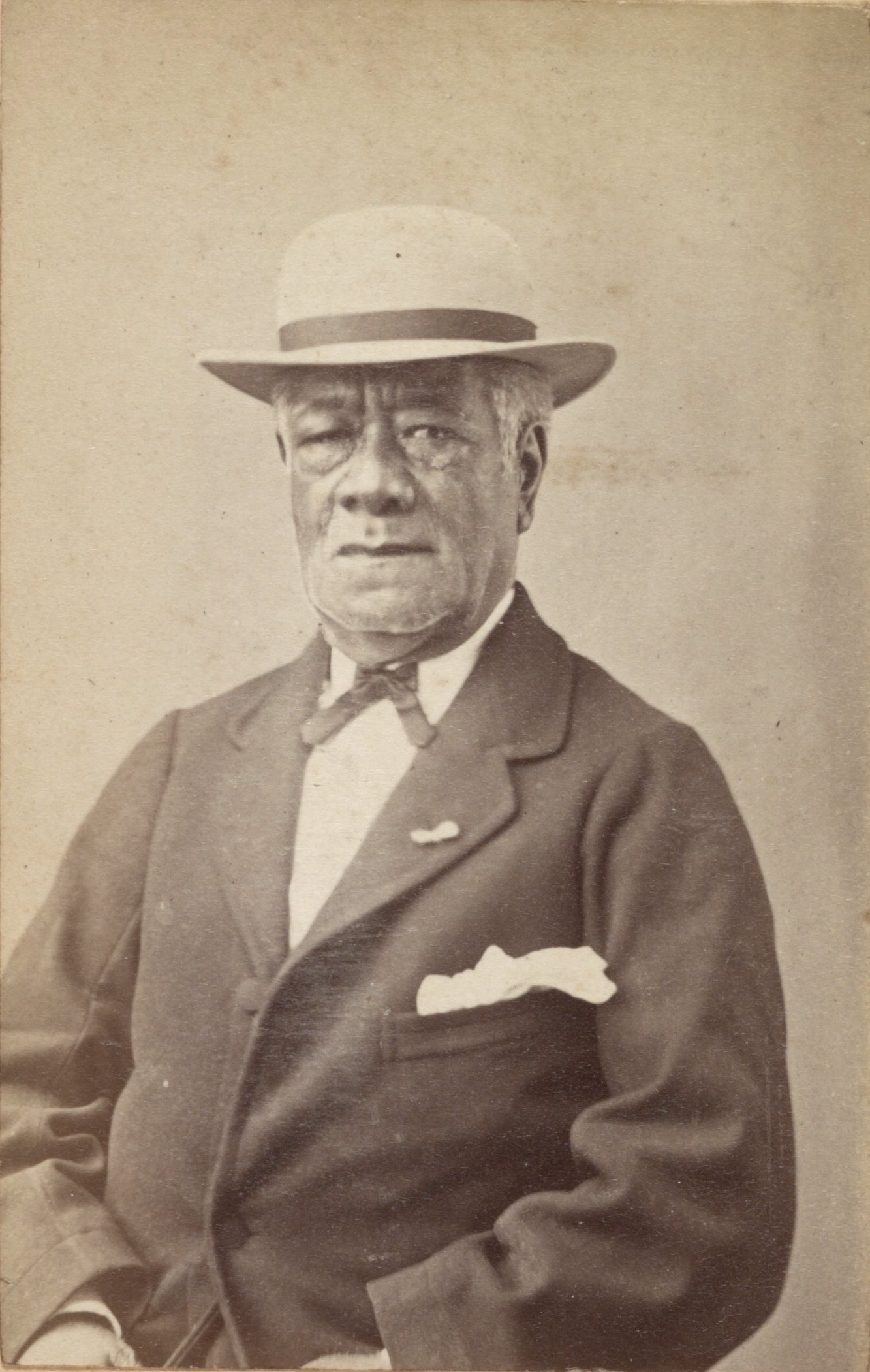

Governor of Kauaʻi
- In office 1847 – January 4, 1877
- Preceded by: Kekauʻōnohi
- Succeeded by: John E. Bush

Personal details
- Born: c. 1802 Kahaluu, South Kona, Hawaii, Kingdom of Hawaii
- Died: November 10, 1885 (aged 83) Honolulu, Oahu
- Resting place: Kawaiahaʻo Church
- Spouse(s): Kahanaauwai; Kapau?
- Children: Paul P. Kanoa (hānai); Deborah Kanoa

Paul (Paulo) Kanoa (c. 1802 – November 10, 1885) was a Hawaiian high chief who served many political posts in the Kingdom of Hawaii, including Governor of Kauaʻi from 1847 to 1877.

== Biography ==
Kanoa was born around the year 1802 in Kahaluu in South Kona on the island of Hawaii. His parents were Kapuohoula and Kepaa. His family descended from the Molokai chiefess Kaneʻalai. Kekūanaōʻa, the father of Kamehameha IV and Kamehameha V, and Boaz Mahune, the author of the Hawaiian Declaration of Rights of 1839, were his cousins. In his youth, Kanoa lived for a time with Gerrit P. Judd, an American missionary and advisor to King Kamehameha III, and also accompanied Rev. Hiram Bingham I on two missionary trips to Kauaʻi.

He started his political career as a secretary of his cousin Kekūanaōʻa, the Governor of Oʻahu. In 1842, Kanoa was elected along with L. Kolona Halaʻi as Oʻahu's representative to Legislature of Hawaii at Lahaina, the capital at the time. Kanoa served as a clerk in the 1842 session of the legislature. In 1845, he was appointed an official member of the House of Nobles, the upper house of the legislature. In order to replace the diminishing number of aliʻi nui, it was decided on April 2, 1845, to vote lower-ranking chiefs who were "men of learning" into the council and elevate their chiefly statuses. Kanoa was among the first group of six lesser chiefs chosen. He also served as a member of the Privy Council from October 21, 1846, to February 23, 1874. In 1847, Paul Kanoa was appointed to succeed Princess Kekauʻōnohi as the Royal Governor of Kauaʻi, a position he held until his resignation on January 4, 1877. Unlike his predecessors who ruled like conquerors, his rule, although firm, was characterized by cooperation with the resurgent native chiefs of Kauaʻi. During this period, the sugar industry became the dominant enterprise on the island and businessmen such as Paul Isenberg and William Hyde Rice profited from close affiliation with Governor Kanoa. In his long political career, Kanoa served under the reigns of five monarchs: Kamehameha III, Kamehameha IV and Kamehameha V, Lunalilo and Kalākaua.

== Death and legacy ==
Paul Kanoa died at the age of 83, on November 10, 1885, after falling from a second-storey room, in his Honolulu residence. After a state funeral on November 15, he was buried in a family vault at the cemetery of Kawaiahaʻo Church. He was survived by his widow Kahanaauwai, hānai son Paul P. Kanoa, who was also Governor of Kauaʻi from 1881 to 1886, and his only daughter Deborah Maunakilika Kanoa, who became his sole heir. Owning extensive lands on Kauaʻi extending from Koloa to Hanamaulu, he built a home on the hills overlooking the beach of Nawiliwili Bay, around the present day Niumalu Beach Park. It later was converted into a courthouse and county offices and became the Kauai High School around 1914.

In 1931, historian Ethel Moseley Damon wrote about Governor Kanoa:

Governor Kanoa was one of the outstanding figures in Kauai society... A commanding figure physically, with a strong yet responsive face, and a shrewd though genial expression, Paul Kanoa was also a commanding figure in his sturdy uprightness and his unswerving devotion to duty and honor as he understood them.

== Bibliography ==
- Bingham, Hiram (1855) [1848]. A Residence of Twenty-one Years in the Sandwich Islands (Third ed.). Canadaigua, NY: H. D. Goodwin. OCLC 557953377.
- Damon, Ethel Moseley; Isenberg, Mary Dorothea Rice (1931). Koamalu: A Story of Pioneers on Kauai and of What They Built in That Island Garden. Vol. 1. Honolulu: Honolulu Star-Bulletin Press. OCLC 653475.
- Day, Arthur Grove (1984). History Makers of Hawaii: a Biographical Dictionary. Honolulu: Mutual Publishing of Honolulu. ISBN 978-0-935180-09-1. OCLC 11087565.
- Forbes, David W., ed. (2003). Hawaiian National Bibliography, 1780–1900. Vol. 4. Honolulu: University of Hawaii Press. ISBN 0-8248-2636-1. OCLC 123279964.
- Fornander, Abraham (1920). Thrum, Thomas G. (ed.). Fornander Collection of Hawaiian Antiquities and Folk-lore. Vol. 6. Honolulu: Bishop Museum Press. OCLC 3354092.
- Hawaii (1918). Lydecker, Robert Colfax (ed.). Roster Legislatures of Hawaii, 1841–1918. Honolulu: Hawaiian Gazette Company. OCLC 60737418.
- Joesting, Edward (1988). Kauai: The Separate Kingdom. Honolulu: University of Hawaii Press. ISBN 978-0-8248-1162-4. OCLC 154200817.
- Kamakau, Samuel (1992) [1961]. Ruling Chiefs of Hawaii (Revised ed.). Honolulu: Kamehameha Schools Press. ISBN 0-87336-014-1. OCLC 25008795.
- Kaeo, Peter; Queen Emma (1976). Korn, Alfons L. (ed.). News from Molokai, Letters Between Peter Kaeo & Queen Emma, 1873–1876. Honolulu: The University Press of Hawaii. hdl:10125/39980. ISBN 978-0-8248-0399-5. OCLC 2225064.
- Karpiel, Frank (1999). "Notes & Queries – The Hale Naua Society". The Hawaiian Journal of History. 33. Honolulu: Hawaiian Historical Society: 203–212. hdl:10524/509. OCLC 60626541.
- Osorio, Jon Kamakawiwoʻole (2002). Dismembering Lāhui: A History of the Hawaiian Nation to 1887. Honolulu: University of Hawaii Press. ISBN 0-8248-2549-7. OCLC 48579247.
