= Hawaiian Way Fund =

Hawaiian Way Fund (HWF), based in Honolulu, Hawaii, is the donor program of the Hawaiian Council, a tax-exempt non-profit corporation reaching hundreds of community-based organizations. The HWF name celebrates the Hawaiian way by which Aloha is shared, the Hawaiian way by which the lives of others are enhanced, and the Hawaiian way of finding solutions within the community. The name represents and honors the Indigenous culture of the Hawaiian Islands. The purpose of the HWF is to enhance the well-being of Hawaii through community-based initiatives founded on Hawaiian culture, knowledge, and traditions. It is a unique cultural and community development fund that connects everyday individuals to the power of Hawaiian culture.

The overall goals of the HWF are:

- To invest in Native Hawaiian community organizations
- To decrease fundraising expenses for all involved
- To increase direct impact of gifts
- To support multiple small nonprofits
- To provide accountability to donors, recipients, and the community

== History ==
The HWF was founded by Hawaiian Council in 2004, with seed funding and support from Hawaiian Council and two corporations. It was developed by Hawaiian Council founder Robin Danner. In the beginning, a roundtable of more than 30 community organizations provided guidance for the fund. In September 2004, nine (9) Partner Recipients working in communities and with Hawaii residents across the state were awarded Fund dollars. Since then, HWF has continued to grow, and support programs dedicated to community development, enhancing best practices, and increasing the skills of community organizations. As of July 2009, HWF supports over thirty (30) Partner Recipients. In addition to providing direct funding to Hawaiian organizations, the HWF also sponsors specific programs and events, such as, conventions and grants forums.

== Giving approach ==
The HWF has a deliberate focus to benefit small, grassroots organizations maintaining important cultural and community service programs. The fund aims to practice a distinctly Hawaiian way of giving – one that does not necessarily look for the longest track record or the most ambitious plan, but instead recognizes the importance of contributions that place a priority on culture and community.

Recipients of Hawaiian Way Fund dollars have been members of Hawaiian Council for at least two (2) years. The list of Partner Recipients currently consists of Native Hawaiian non-profits delivering an array of community development programs and services, ranging from halau hula to language, environment to education, and housing to economic development, all tied to a common mission of community well-being. Each organization applies for designation as a Partner Recipient of the Hawaiian Way Fund and must meet programming criteria.

At this time, the fund receives dollars through two (2) sources of revenue: individual contributions or gifts, and payroll deductions. Individual contributions can be made as a “one-time” donation by cash, check, or credit card. Payroll deductions are facilitated through the use of Employer Partners. Through Employer Partners, employees of partnering organizations have the opportunity to make a predetermined payroll deduction with varying frequency. The HWF is also eligible to receive designated gifts through the Aloha United Way and the Combined Federal Campaign.

== Accountability ==
As a community development and cultural fund, the HWF ensures that the donor gifts directly touch Hawaiian communities. To ensure maximum impact of these gifts, Hawaiian Council dedicates its most senior officers to the administration of the fund at no salary cost to the Fund itself. The HWF has an advisory committee that is appointed by the Hawaiian Council board of directors and/or its executive committee. The advisory committee convenes throughout the year to oversee fiscal accountability, fundraising activities, and eligibility of Partner Recipients. They represent the best in their respective fields and bring important perspectives and energy to the fund.

The HWF is subject to Hawaiian Council's annual audit by an independent accounting firm located in Honolulu, Hawaii. With oversight by an advisory committee and Hawaiian Council's 15-member board of directors, the HWF presents a credible fund that values accountability and transparent reporting.
