= Nāwiliwili Beach Park =

Park in Hawaii, United States

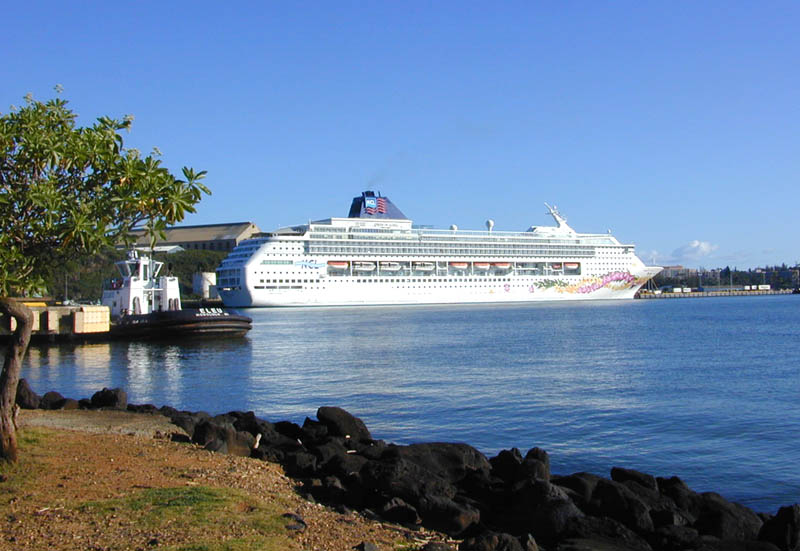
Port of Nāwiliwili

Nāwiliwili Beach Park is a beach park and port on the south-east coast of the island of Kauaʻi in the Hawaiian Islands. It is located on Nāwiliwili Bay at 21°57′33″N 159°21′10″W, about 1.9 miles (3.1 km) south of Līhuʻe. It is at the south end of Hawaii Route 51, known as Rice Street. Just to the west is Niumalu Beach Park. Across Nāwiliwili Bay is Kawai Point.
