= Niumalu =

District of Kauai, Hawaii

Coordinates: 21.956°N 159.376°W

Niumalu is a district on the southeast coast of the island of Kauai in the Hawaiian Islands. It has a population of approximately 7,000 people. The Niumalu Beach Park is located within the district.
