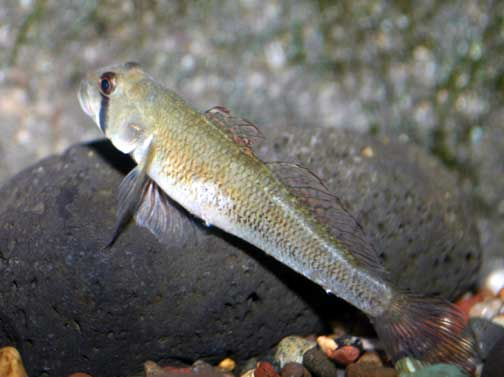

Conservation status
- Vulnerable (NatureServe)

Scientific classification
- Domain: Eukaryota
- Kingdom: Animalia
- Phylum: Chordata
- Class: Actinopterygii
- Order: Gobiiformes
- Family: Oxudercidae
- Genus: Stenogobius
- Species: S. hawaiiensis

Binomial name
- Stenogobius hawaiiensis Watson, 1991

= Stenogobius hawaiiensis =

Species of fish

Stenogobius hawaiiensis, the Naniha goby, is a species of goby endemic to the Hawaiian Islands where it can be found in marine, brackish and fresh waters. This species is not as adept a climber as are many other Hawaiian gobies and thus is not found in the upper reaches of streams. This species can reach a length of 11.4 centimetres (4.5 in) SL. In the Hawaiian language, it is also known as O'opu naniha. It feeds on invertebrates such as worms, crustaceans and insects as well as algae. It is preyed upon by birds such as the black-crowned night-heron (Nycticorax nycticorax) as well as native fishes such as Caranx spp., Polydactylus sexfilis and Sphyraena barracuda. Invasive alien fish such as mosquito fish and game species threaten the populations of S. hawaiiensis by bringing new diseases and parasites and by predating on their eggs and fry. They may also be threatened by alteration of their habitat by humans such as abstraction, pollution and damming but not to as great an extent as these factors affect other native Hawaiian freshwater fish, there is also some fishing for this species.

This species displays sexual dimorphism and undertakes elaborate courtship behaviours. The female Stenogobius hawaiiensis lays 6000-8000 eggs, which the male guards until they hatch, after which the larvae drift down to the sea in the current. The larvae will live in the sea for up to six months before returning to freshwater, where they will spend the remainder of their lives.
