= Hanalei, Hawaii =

Hanalei
- Census-designated place
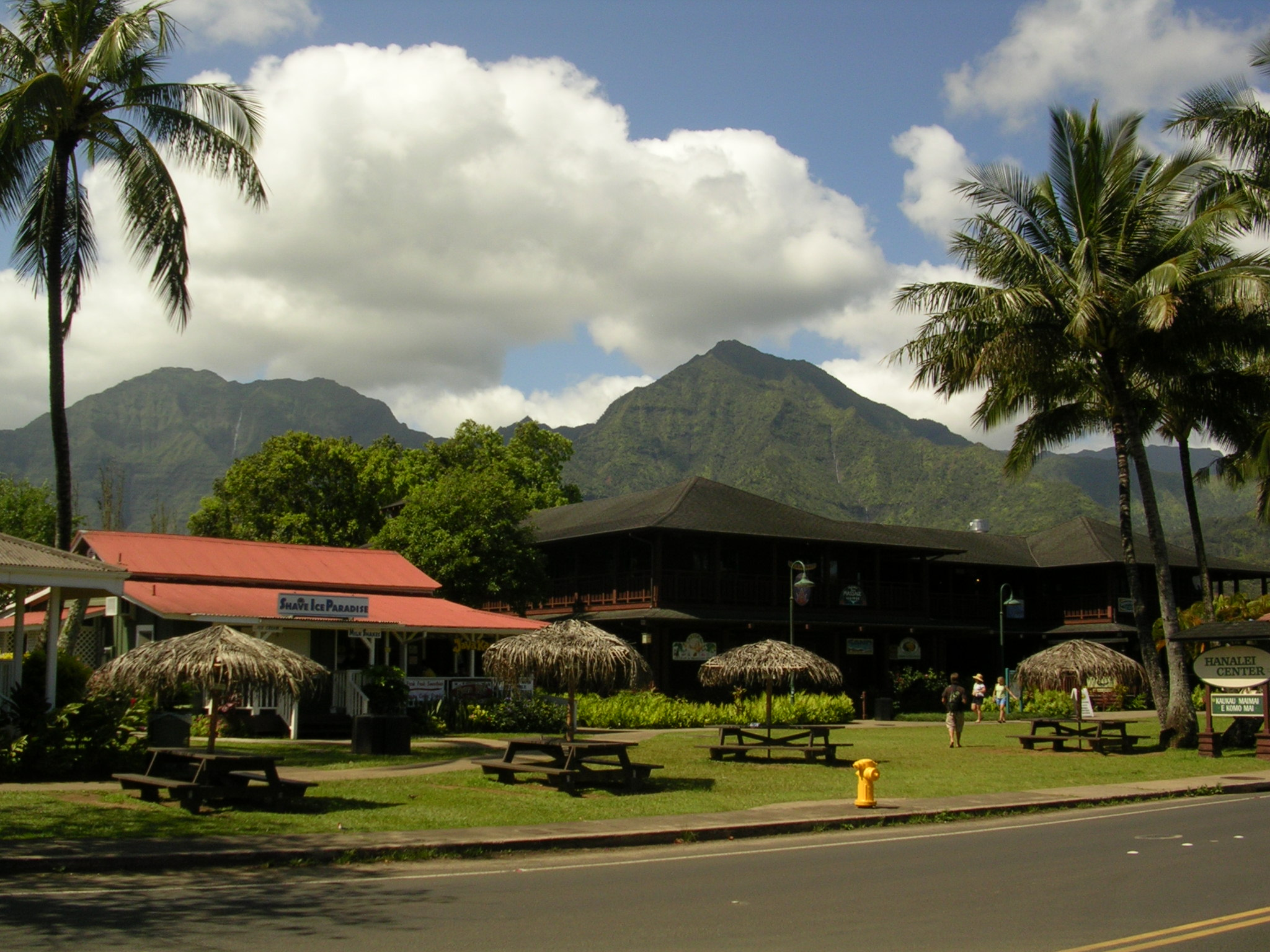
- Hanalei Town with a view of Mt. Na Molokama, and Māmalahoa

- Location in Kauaʻi County and the state of Hawaii
- Coordinates: 22°12′24″N 159°30′3″W
- Country: United States
- State: Hawaii
- County: Kauaʻi

Area
  - Total: 0.72 sq mi (1.86 km^{2})
  - Land: 0.68 sq mi (1.75 km^{2})
  - Water: 0.039 sq mi (0.10 km^{2})
- Elevation: 0 ft (0 m)

Population (2020)
  - Total: 444
  - Density: 655.6/sq mi (253.14/km^{2})
- Time zone: UTC-10 (Hawaii-Aleutian)
- ZIP code: 96714
- Area code: 808
- FIPS code: 15-11500
- GNIS feature ID: 0359039

Hanalei is a census-designated place (CDP) in Kauaʻi County, Hawaii, United States. As of the 2020 census, Hanalei had a population of 444. Hanalei means "lei making" in Hawaiian. Alternatively, the name Hanalei also means "crescent bay" and may be indicative of the shape of Hanalei Bay. Hanalei can also be translated as lei valley, referring to the rainbows that color the valley and encircle Hanalei like a wreath.

== Geography ==
Hanalei is located at 22°12′24″N 159°30′3″W (22.206653, -159.500713), near the mouth of the Hanalei River on Kauaʻi's north shore. It is bordered to the east by Princeville.

According to the United States Census Bureau, the CDP has an area of 0.71 square miles (1.84 km^{2}), of which 0.65 square miles (1.69 km^{2}) are land and 0.058 square miles (0.15 km^{2}) are water. The total area is 8.17% water.

== History ==
Hanalei was densely populated in ancient times, boasting a thriving indigenous community that produced an abundance of food from both terrestrial and marine sources. The earliest inhabitants of Hanalei cultivated substantial quantities of taro, bananas, breadfruit, sweet potatoes, yams, and coconuts. With the arrival of foreigners in Hawaii, new agricultural endeavors were introduced. During the first half of the 19th century, Hanalei became a significant supplier of various crops, including mulberry leaves, coffee, tobacco, cotton, rice, sugarcane, citrus fruits, peaches, pineapples, bananas, dates, tamarinds, guava, potatoes, plantains, cabbage, lettuce, and other agricultural products.

=== Hawaiian Royalty ===
Hanalei, located on the island of Kauai, was a frequent destination for members of the Royal Hawaiian family during the 19th century. Notably, King Kamehameha II embarked on a 42-day voyage to Kauai in 1821. Later, King Kamehameha III visited Hanalei in 1852. Subsequent visits were made by King Kamehameha IV, who traveled to Hanalei in 1856 accompanied by Queen Emma and again with their young son, Prince Albert. These royal visits inspired Robert Crichton Wyllie, the owner of a local plantation, to name his estate Princeville in honor of the young prince.

In 1867, Princess Ruth Ke’elikolani visited Hanalei, where she picnicked on the Hanalei River accompanied by her two poodles. Seven years later, in 1874, King Kalakaua also visited Hanalei Bay, receiving a ceremonial welcome that included a 21-gun salute. This salute was uniquely executed using cannons improvised from Ohia Lehua trees.

=== Imperial Russia ===
In the early 19th century Russians were present here. In 1815 the German physician and agent of the Russian-American Company Georg Anton Schäffer came to the Hawaiian Islands to retrieve goods seized by Kaumualiʻi, chief of Kauaʻi island. On arrival he became involved with internal Hawaiian politics, and Kaumualiʻi planned and manipulated to reclaim Kauai from Kamehameha I with the Russian Empire's help. Kaumualiʻi signed a "treaty" granting Tsar Alexander I protectorate over Kauai. In 1817, Fort Elizabeth, near the Waimea River, and two other Russian forts near Hanalei were briefly part of tsarist Russian America.

=== 1900s ===
During the early 20th century, the coastal plain of Hanalei was predominantly utilized for rice cultivation, with nearly all available land being dedicated to rice fields. The initial rice farmers were predominantly Chinese, later followed by Japanese, Filipino, Portuguese, and other ethnic groups. Many of these individuals were former sugarcane plantation workers who had completed their contractual obligations. The rice farming community in Hanalei established a comprehensive infrastructure, including homes, educational institutions, retail stores, rice mills, and places of worship such as churches and temples. Today, many descendants of these farmers and plantation workers continue to reside in Hanalei

== Demographics ==
Historical population
| Census | Pop. | Note | %± |
|---|---|---|---|
| 2020 | 444 | | — |
U.S. Decennial Census

At the 2000 census, there were 478 people, 193 households and 115 families residing in the CDP. The population density was 736.7 inhabitants per square mile (284.4/km^{2}). There were 303 housing units at an average density of 467.0 per square mile (180.3/km^{2}). The racial makeup of the CDP was 57% White, 18% Asian, 3% Pacific Islander, <1% from other races, and 21% from two or more races. Hispanic or Latino of any race were 4.81% of the population.

There were 193 households, of which 25% had children under the age of 18 living with them, 40% were married couples living together, 10% had a female householder with no husband present, and 40% were non-families. 31% of all households were made up of individuals, and 6.2% had someone living alone who was 65 years of age or older. The average household size was 2.48 and the average family size was 3.10.

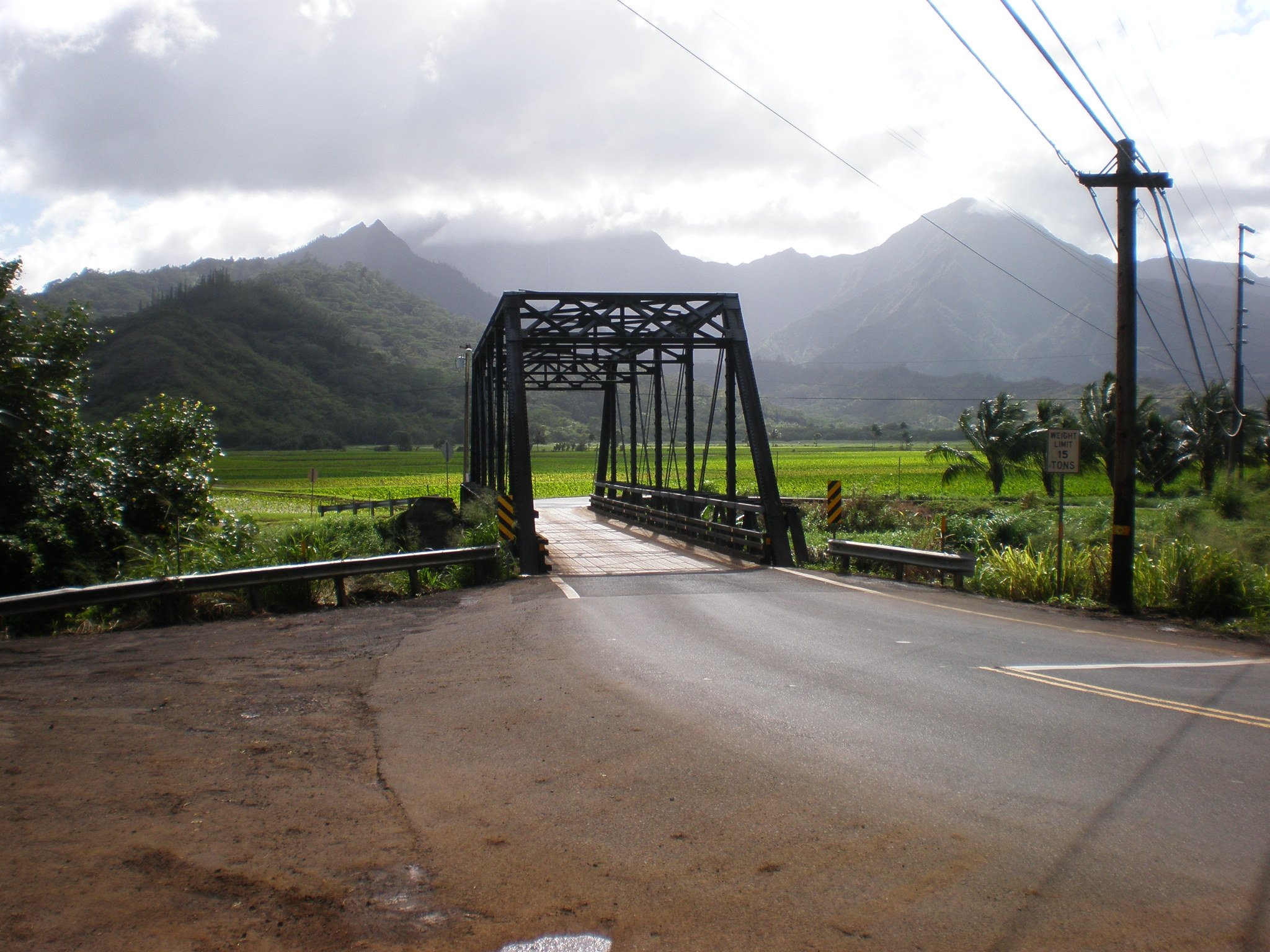
The Hanalei Bridge, a one lane bridge located on Kuhio Highway, crosses the Hanalei River

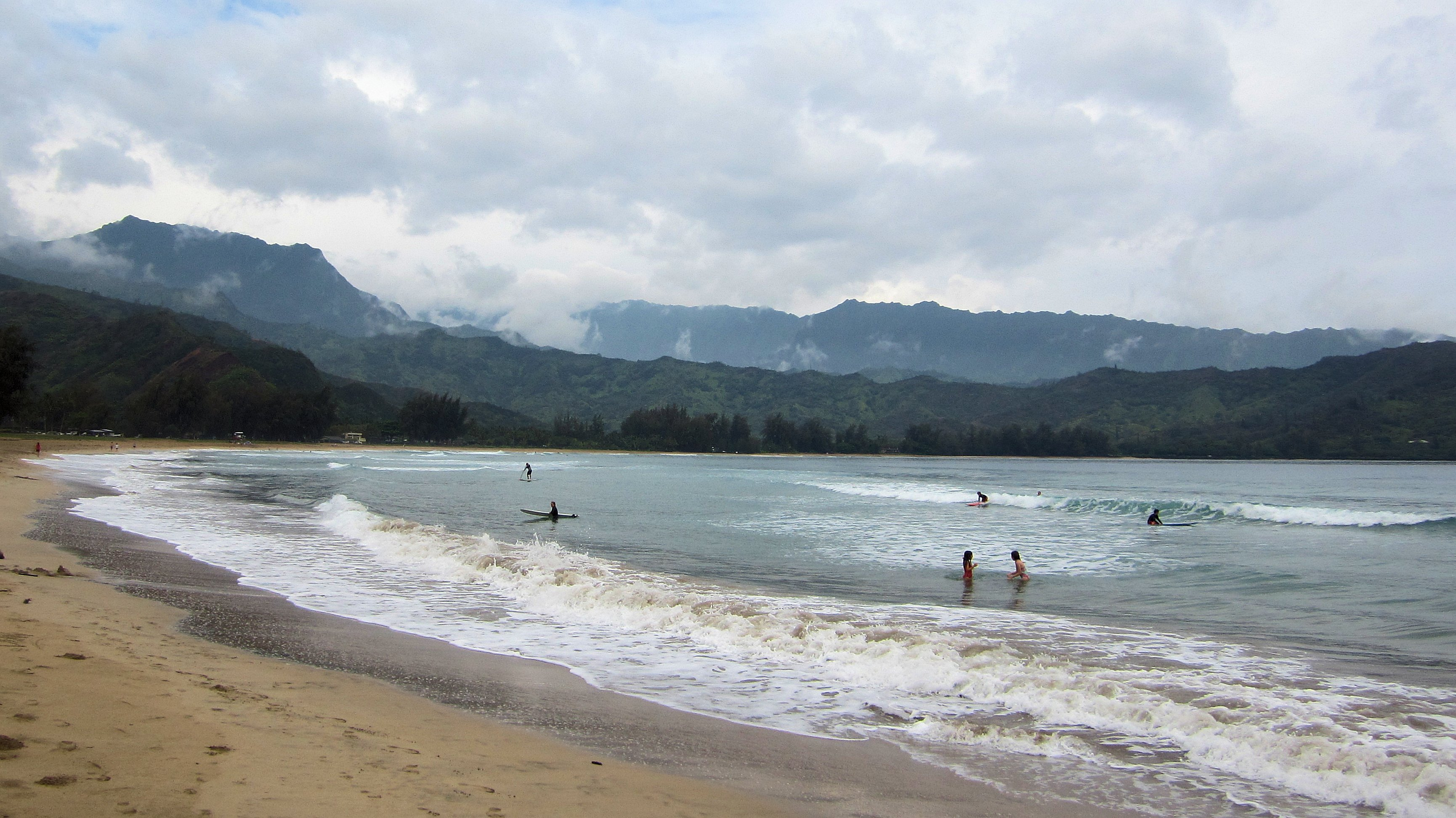
The beach at Hanalei Bay

24% of the population were under the age of 18, 7% from 18 to 24, 27% from 25 to 44, 30% from 45 to 64, and 12% who were 65 years of age or older. The median age was 40 years. For every 100 females, there were 99.2 males. For every 100 females age 18 and over, there were 102.8 males.

The median household income was $34,375, and the median family income was $55,750. Males had a median income of $31,500 versus $28,500 for females. The per capita income for the CDP was $21,241. About 22% of families and 25% of the population were below the poverty line, including 33% of those under the age of 18 and none of those 65 and older.

== Popular culture ==
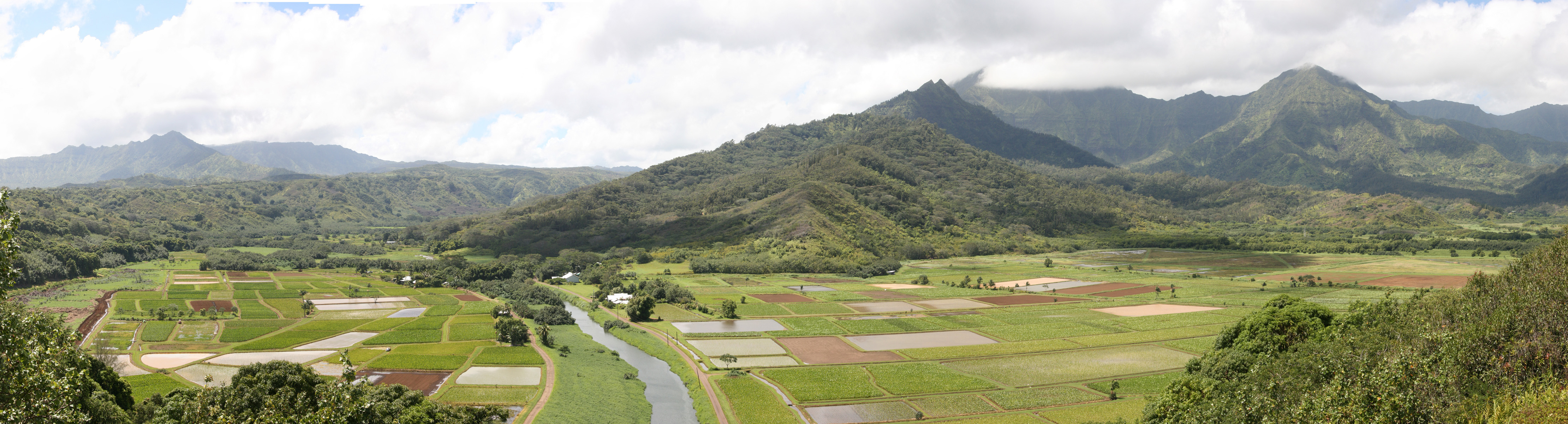
Hanalei Valley viewed from the lookout near Princeville

Hanalei was the backdrop of several film productions, such as the 1958 musical film South Pacific. Scenes were filmed in the town itself and at Lumahai Beach, west of town.

In 1983 parts of the movie Uncommon Valor were filmed two miles from Hanalei.

A speculative interpretation of the Peter Paul & Mary song "Puff, the Magic Dragon" as a marijuana metaphor claims that Puff's homeland "Hanah Lee" is actually the town of Hanalei, which, according to the interpretation, is renowned for its marijuana. The cliffs on the side of the beach are said to look like a dragon. This interpretation was rejected by the song's authors.

The beach at Hanalei Bay was selected No. 1 on "Dr. Beach" Stephen Leatherman's 2009 list of top 10 beaches.

Hanalei was mentioned in the TV series Twin Peaks as a place of residence for the town psychiatrist and his wife.

Parts of the movie The Descendants were filmed in and around Hanalei, on the beach at Hanalei Bay and in Princeville.

A song titled "Hanalei" was a part of the I'm with You Sessions by the Red Hot Chili Peppers in 2013.

== Education ==
Hanalei is served by the Hawaiʻi Department of Education. Hanalei Elementary School is in the community, and is a public K-6 school with around 250 students. Middle school and high school are in Kapa'a for all youth who reside on the North Shore of Kauai. Kapa'a Middle School is for 6th-8th grade, and Kapa'a High School is for 9th-12th grade.
