= Native Hawaiian Legal Corporation =

- Formation: 1974
- Founder: Kawaipuna Prejean
- Headquarters: Honolulu, Hawaii
- Executive director: Makalika Naholowaʻa
- Website: nativehawaiianlegalcorp.org

The Native Hawaiian Legal Corporation (NHLC) is a 501(c)(3) non-profit organization and public interest law firm dedicated to representing Native Hawaiians in legal disputes over land rights, use of natural resources, sovereignty, and other such issues in Hawaii.

NHLC was founded in 1974 by Kawaipuna Prejean, in the midst of the Second Hawaiian Renaissance, as the Hawaiian Coalition of Native Claims. It is the only legal organization in the world dedicated exclusively to the protection and advancement of Native Hawaiian rights.

NHLC is funded by the Office of Hawaiian Affairs (OHA) and works in conjunction with them and other legal organizations. In September 2025, Summer Sylva, a former executive director of NHLC, was appointed as OHA's interim administrator.

Its current executive director, as of January 14, 2022, is Makalika Naholowaʻa.
