= Kalākaua's Cabinet ministers =

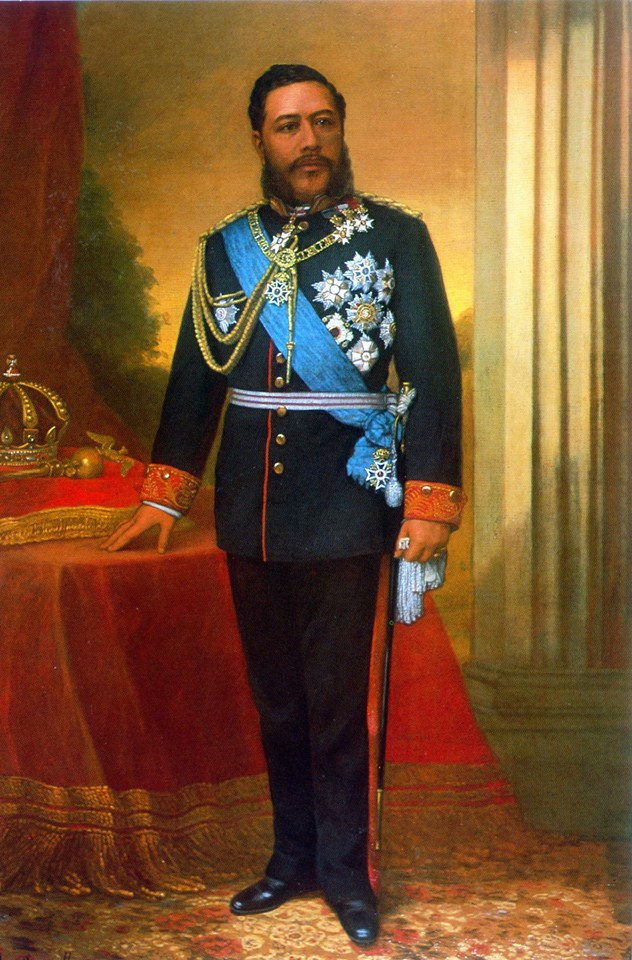
King Kalākaua painting by William F. Cogswell

When King Kalākaua began his reign on February 12, 1874, the monarch was constitutionally empowered to appoint and remove the Kingdom of Hawaii cabinet ministers. The four cabinet positions were Attorney General, Minister of Finance, Minister of Foreign Affairs and Minister of the Interior. The royal cabinet ministers were also ex-officio members of the House of Nobles in the legislature and the Privy Council of State, a larger body of advisors.

The 1875 Reciprocity Treaty with the United States eliminated tariffs on the kingdom's sugar exports, bringing an accelerated upswing in the Hawaii's economic prosperity. The criteria for appointment to the cabinet changed from being qualified to advise the head of state, to being willing to enable the monarch's chosen course of state. Kalākaua and Legislative Assembly Finance Chair Walter Murray Gibson responded with reckless spending and grandiose schemes.

Frustrated by his cabinet, the king dismissed them all on August 14, 1880. Samuel Gardner Wilder was replaced by John E. Bush as Minister of the Interior. Attorney General Edward Preston was replaced by W. Claude Jones. Minister of Finance Simon Kaloa Kaʻai was replaced by Moses Kuaea. Celso Caesar Moreno was denied recognition by the diplomatic corps stationed in Hawaii when he replaced Minister of Foreign Affairs John Mākini Kapena. Moreno resigned on August 18.

Gibson was appointed to the cabinet in 1882, and would eventually become its Prime Minister. Concerns were addressed in a written statement from businessmen to Kalākaua, "... the course of Your Majesty's present Ministry is not conducive to the public interest, nor the interest of Your Majesty ..." They accused the Ministry of influence peddling in elections and manipulation of legislative governance. The warning was brushed off by Gibson, with no response from Kalākaua. The Gibson cabinet dissolved July 1, 1887, ushering in the so-called Reform Cabinet. The Committee of Thirteen business men drafted what became known as the Bayonet Constitution, codifying the legislature as the supreme authority over actions by the monarch. Kalākaua was given no alternative but to sign the document on July 6.

The Reform Cabinet eventually fell to internal discord, replaced with a new cabinet on June 17, 1890, consisting of Attorney General Arthur P. Peterson, Finance Minister Godfrey Brown, Foreign Affairs Minister John Adams Cummins, and Interior Minister Charles Nichols Spencer. When Kalākaua died on January 20, 1891, Peterson, Brown and Cummins were held over until Queen regnant Liliʻuokalani replaced them on February 25. Spencer remained in her cabinet until September 12, 1892, when he was replaced by Charles T. Gulick.

== Cabinet ministers 1874–1891 ==
Name	Portrait	Cabinet post	Notes	Ref(s)
Luther Aholo		Minister of the Interior; Oct 13, 1886 -July 1, 1887	Represented Lahaina, Maui in the legislature, vice president of the Legislative Assembly 1876–1886; Postmaster General of the Kingdom 1886.	
William Nevins Armstrong		Attorney General; Nov 29, 1880 – Jan 17, 1881; Nov 5, 1881– May 19, 1882	Kalākaua's classmate at the Chiefs Children's School; graduate of Yale University law school; he took leave as Attorney General to join Kalākaua's 1881 world tour.	
Clarence W. Ashford		Attorney General; July 1, 1887 – June 14, 1890	Reform cabinet; he was exiled to California for his support of Liliʻuokalani following the overthrow of the kingdom.	
Jonathan Austin		Minister of Foreign Affairs; Dec 28, 1887 – June 17, 1890	President of Paukaa Sugar Company	
Charles Reed Bishop		Minister of Foreign Affairs; Jan 10, 1873 – Feb 17, 1874	Hold-over from Lunalilo cabinet; husband of Princess Bernice Pauahi Bishop; businessman and philanthropist; at Kalākaua's bedside when he died January 20, 1891.	
Godfrey Brown		Minister of Foreign Affairs; July 1 – Dec 28, 1887; Minister of Finance; June 17, 1890 – Feb 25, 1891	Reform cabinet (as Minister of Foreign Affairs); after Kalākaua's death, Brown remained as finance minister until Liliʻuokalani installed Herman A. Widemann in the position.	
John Edward Bush		Minister of Foreign Affairs (acting); Aug 19 – Sept 22, 1880; Minister of Finance; May 20 – Aug 8, 1882; Minister of the Interior; Aug 8, 1882 – May 14, 1883	During the Gibson regime, Bush was special envoy to Samoa in an ill-fated attempt to form a Polynesian alliance with Samoan King Malietoa Laupepa.	
Henry A. P. Carter		Minister of Foreign Affairs; Dec 5, 1876 – Mar 1, 1878; Attorney General (during Armstrong's absence); Jan 17 – Nov 5, 1881	Career diplomat; majority owner of C. Brewer & Co sugar plantation.	
William Richards Castle		Attorney General; Feb 15 – Dec 5, 1876	A member of the Committee of Safety that requested American intervention in overthrowing the monarchy.	
Robert James Creighton		Minister of Foreign Affairs; June 30 – Oct 13, 1886	Friend of Claus Spreckels who arrived from San Francisco in 1885 to be editor of the Pacific Commercial Advertiser; his son Charles F. Creighton briefly served as Liliʻuokalani's Attorney General.	
John Adams Cummins		Minister of Foreign Affairs; June 17, 1890 – Feb 25, 1891	Maternal link to Hawaiian royalty; wealthy businessman with global social ties; after Kalākaua's death, Cummins remained until Liliʻuokalani installed Samuel Parker in the position.	
Samuel Mills Damon		Minister of Finance; July 22, 1889 – June 17, 1890	Son of missionaries; became business partner of Charles Reed Bishop.	
John T. Dare		Attorney General; July 1- Oct 13, 1886	Legal counsel to Claus Spreckels; Assistant District Attorney of San Francisco prior to arriving in Hawaii.	
Walter M. Gibson		Minister of Foreign Affairs; May 20, 1882 – June 30, 1886; Oct 13, 1886 – July 1, 1887; Attorney General (acting); May 14- Dec 14, 1883; Sept 18, 1884 – Aug 3, 1885 (ad interim); Minister of the Interior (acting); May 14, 1883 – Aug 6, 1883; June 30, 1886 – Oct 13, 1886; Prime Minister; June 30, 1886 – Oct 13, 1886	Enabled Kalākaua's excessive spending and grandiose schemes; as Legislative Assembly Finance Chair: $50,000 for a new palace, $10,000 for a coronation, and $10,000 for a statue of Kamehameha; as Prime Minister: $15,000 for the king's birthday jubilee; he encouraged a Polynesian confederation, with the king as the head: $100,000 to buy a steamship, with $50,000 for operating expenses, and $35,000 for foreign missions.	
William Lowthian Green		Minister of Finance; July 1, 1887 – July 22, 1889; Minister of Foreign Affairs; Feb 17, 1874 – Dec 5, 1876; Sept 22, 1880 – May 20, 1882; Minister of the Interior (acting); May 28, 1874 – Oct 31, 1874	Geologist and businessman; the Reciprocity Treaty of 1875 was ratified while he was Minister of Foreign Affairs; Kalākaua requested Green choose a new cabinet to replace the Gibson cabinet.	
Charles T. Gulick		Minister of the Interior; Aug 6, 1883 – June 30, 1886 (acting) Minister of Finance; Sept 1, 1885	Nephew of missionary Peter Johnson Gulick, he supported the monarchy and would later be sentenced for his participation in the 1895 Wilcox rebellion.	
Edwin Oscar Hall		Minister of the Interior; Feb 12, 1874 – Feb 17, 1874	Hold-over from Lunalilo cabinet; replaced by Hermann A. Widemann; printer, editor and businessman, he was part of the Seventh Company of missionaries that arrived in Hawaii in 1835; served as Minister of Finance under Kamehameha III.	
Alfred S. Hartwell		Attorney General; Feb 18 – May 28, 1874; Dec 5, 1876 – July 3, 1878	Justice of the Supreme Court; Sept 30, 1868 – Feb 18, 1874; The July 3, 1878 cabinet dismissal was due to pressure from Gibson, whose "want of confidence" resolution failed in the legislature, as well as pressure from Claus Spreckels who wanted water rights for his Maui plantation, and generally from Kalākaua's dissatisfaction with them.	
W. Claude Jones		Attorney General; Aug 14, 1880 – Sept 27, 1880	An adventurer who had various careers and political connections in Missouri, New Mexico and Arizona before relocating to Hawaii in 1866; objections to his appointment as Attorney General were based on his "second-rate standing as a lawyer"; replaced by John Smith Walker.	
Albert Francis Judd		Attorney General; Feb 12- 19, 1874	Hold-over from Lunalilo cabinet; appointed Associate Justice of Supreme Court of Hawaii on February 1, 1874, becoming Chief Justice on November 5, 1881.	
Simon Kaloa Kaʻai		Minister of Finance; July 3, 1878 – Aug 14, 1880; Aug 8, 1882 – Feb 13, 1883; Minister of the Interior; May 20, 1882 – Aug 8, 1882	After the Moreno affair, Kaʻai defended Kalākaua's right to choose his ministers.	
Paul Puhiula Kanoa		Minister of Finance; June 30, 1886 – July 1, 1887	Membership in Hale Nauā Society, founded by Kalākaua and others to foster native Hawaiian leaders in governmental and public service.	
John Mākini Kapena		Minister of Finance; Dec 5, 1876 – July 3, 1878; Feb 13, 1883 – June 30, 1886; Minister of Foreign Affairs; July 3, 1878 – Aug 14, 1880	The July 3, 1878 cabinet dismissal was due to pressure from Gibson, whose "want of confidence" resolution failed in the legislature, from Claus Spreckels who wanted water rights for his Maui plantation, and generally from Kalākaua's dissatisfaction with them.	
John Lot Kaulukoʻu		Attorney General; Oct 13- Oct 23, 1886	Membership in Hale Nauā Society, founded by Kalākaua and others to foster native Hawaiian leaders in governmental and public service.	
Moses Kuaea		Minister of Finance; Aug 14 – Sept 27, 1880	Pastor of Kaumakapili Church, with no political background.	
William Luther Moehonua		Minister of the Interior; Oct 31, 1874 – Dec 5, 1876	Member of the 1874 legislature which elected Kalākaua; Chamberlain to the Royal Household, 1874; Resigned in 1876 to become Governor of Maui	
Celso Caesar Moreno		Minister of Foreign Affairs; Aug 14–19 1880	Resigned when denied recognition by the diplomatic corps stationed in Hawaii; traveled to Italy as guardian of four youths studying under Education of Hawaiian Youths Abroad; removed of his guardianship when it was discovered he misrepresented them as Kalākaua's family.	
John Mott-Smith		Minister of the Interior; December 5, 1876; July 3, 1878	Editor of the Hawaiian Gazette, and supporter of the monarchy. The July 3, 1878 cabinet dismissal was due to pressure from Gibson, whose "want of confidence" resolution failed in the legislature, and from Claus Spreckels who wanted water rights for his Maui plantation, and generally from Kalākaua's dissatisfaction with them.	
Paul Nahaolelua		Minister of Finance; Feb 17 – Oct 31, 1874	Former Governor of Maui, President of the Legislative Assembly 1870–1874	
Paul Neumann		Attorney General; Dec 14, 1883 – June 30, 1886	Attorney and California politician alleged to be on the payroll of Claus Spreckels; appointed to the cabinet by Gibson.	
Arthur P. Peterson		Attorney General; June 17, 1890– Feb 25, 1891	After Kalākaua's death on January 20, 1891. Peterson remained as finance minister until Liliʻuokalani installed William Austin Whiting in the position.	
Edward Preston		Attorney General; July 13, 1878 – Aug 14, 1880; May 19, 1882 – May 14, 1883	Resigned over what he perceived as the Cabinet's racial favoritism towards native Hawaiians.	
Antone Rosa		Attorney General; Nov 15, 1886 – June 28, 1887	Membership in Hale Nauā Society, founded by Kalākaua and others to foster native Hawaiian leaders in governmental and public service.	
Charles Nichols Spencer		Minister of the Interior; June 17, 1890– Sept 12, 1892	Held over in Liliuokalani's cabinet after Kalākaua's January 20, 1891 death	
Richard H. Stanley		Attorney General; May 28, 1874 – Nov 5, 1875	Died in office	
Lorrin Andrews Thurston		Minister of the Interior; July 1, 1887 – Sept 27, 1888; Oct 27, 1888 – June 17, 1890	Reform cabinet; grandson of Asa and Lucy Goodale Thurston, of the first company of Christian missionaries in Hawaii; one of the authors of the 1887 Bayonet Constitution.	
John Smith Walker		Minister of Finance; Oct 31, 1874 – December 5, 1876; Sept 27, 1880 – May 20, 1882; Attorney General; Nov 5, 1875 – Feb 15, 1876	Mercantile; import-export business	
Hermann A. Widemann		Minister of the Interior; Feb 17, 1874– May 28, 1874	Justice of the Supreme Court; July 10, 1869 – Feb 18, 1874; Appointed by Kamehameha V	
Samuel Gardner Wilder		Minister of the Interior; July 3, 1878– Aug 14, 1880	Business magnate and political supporter of Kalākaua, he achieved success in the steamship business, as well as sugar plantation railway transportation.	

== See also ==
- Cabinet of the Kingdom of Hawaii
- Kalākaua's Privy Council of State
- Liliʻuokalani's Cabinet ministers
- Bibliography of Kalākaua
- MOS Hawaii-related articles

== Bibliography ==
- Dole, Sanford B. (1936). Farrell, Andrew (ed.). Memoirs of the Hawaiian Revolution. Honolulu: Advertiser Publishing Company. OCLC 4823270 – via HathiTrust.
- Forbes, David W. (2003). Hawaiian national bibliography, 1780–1900. University of Hawaii Press. pp. 232–233. ISBN 978-0-8248-2636-9.
- Hawaiian Mission Children's Society (1901). Portraits of American Protestant missionaries to Hawaii. Hawaiian Gazette Co.
- Karpiel, Frank (1999). "The Hale Naua Society". Hawaiian Journal of History. Vol. 33. Hawaii Historical Society. hdl:10524/509.
- Kuykendall, Ralph Simpson (1967). The Hawaiian Kingdom 1874–1893, The Kalakaua Dynasty. Vol. 3. Honolulu: University of Hawaii Press. ISBN 978-0-87022-433-1. OCLC 500374815.
- Lydecker, Robert C. (1918). Rosters of Legislatures of Hawaii 1841–1918. The Honolulu Gazette Col., Ltd. p. 301.
- Quigg, Agnes (1988). "Kalakaua's Hawaiian Studies Abroad Program". The Hawaiian Journal of History. 22. Honolulu: Hawaiian Historical Society: 170–208. hdl:10524/103 – via eVols at University of Hawai'i at Manoa.
- Yale University (1905). Obituary Records of Yale University. New Haven, CT.: Obituary Records of Yale University – via HathiTrust.
- Thurston, Lorrin A. (1936). Memoirs of the Hawaiian Revolution. Honolulu Advertiser Publishing – via HathiTrust.
