= Liliʻuokalani's Cabinet ministers =

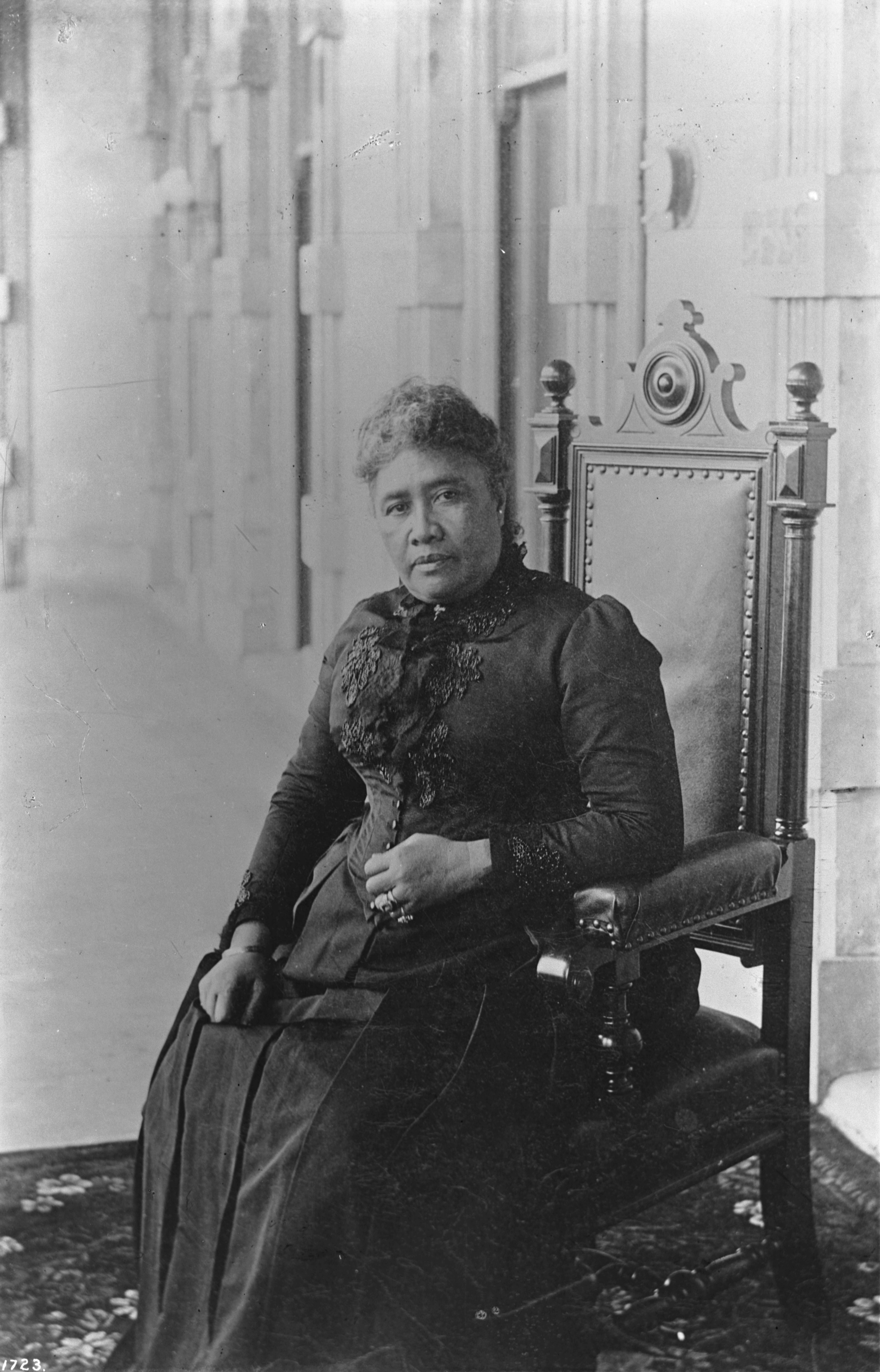
Liliʻuokalani in 1891, prior to accession to the throne

Liliʻuokalani was the first queen regnant and the last sovereign monarch of the Kingdom of Hawaiʻi. The queen ascended to the throne on January 29, 1891, nine days after the death of her brother Kalākaua, and inherited his cabinet ministers. The four cabinet positions were Attorney General, Minister of Finance, Minister of Foreign Affairs and Minister of the Interior. The ministers were ex-officio members of the House of Nobles in the legislature and the Privy Council of State, a larger body of advisors.

The Bayonet Constitution that Kalākaua had been compelled to sign in 1887 allowed the monarch to appoint the cabinet, but transferred the power of their removal to the legislature alone. A legislative "resolution of want of confidence" would force the resignation of an entire cabinet. The new law allowed non-residents to vote, but economic and literacy restrictions disenfranchised a majority of Asians and native Hawaiians. After her brother's funeral, the queen demanded the resignations of his ministers, causing a legal challenge when they refused. The case was decided in her favor by the Supreme Court of the kingdom.

Shortly after her accession, Liliʻuokalani began to receive petitions through the political party Hui Kālaiʻāina and the National Reform Party to re-write the constitution. The proposed constitution co-written by the queen and two legislators, Joseph Nāwahī and William Pūnohu White, would have restored the power to the monarchy, and voting rights to the disenfranchised population.

Attorney General Arthur P. Peterson, Minister of Finance William H. Cornwell, Minister of Foreign Affairs Samuel Parker and Minister of the Interior John F. Colburn were specifically appointed on January 13, 1893, because the queen believed they would support her promulgation of a new constitution, but they refused to sign the document. On January 17, 1893, the Kingdom of Hawaii fell to a coup d'état, planned and executed by the Committee of Safety, mostly foreign-born residents in Honolulu, whose goal was the annexation of Hawaii by the United States.

== Cabinet ministers January 29, 1891 – January 17, 1893 ==
Name	Portrait	Cabinet post	Notes	Ref(s)
Cecil Brown		Attorney General; Nov, 1892 – Jan 12, 1893	Legislative "resolution of want of confidence" passed the legislature on January 12, 1893, ousting the Wilcox cabinet	
Godfrey Brown		Minister of Finance; Jan 29 – Feb 25, 1891	Hold-over from Kalākaua administration; until Liliʻuokalani installed Herman A. Widemann in the position.	
John F. Colburn		Minister of the Interior; Jan 13–17, 1893	Jan 17 overthrow of the kingdom triggered by Colburn, Cornwell, Parker and Peterson refusing to support the queen's promulgation of a new constitution.	
William H. Cornwell		Minister of Finance; Nov 1– 8, 1892; Jan 13–17, 1893	Legislative "resolution of want of confidence" passed the legislature on November 1, 1892, ousting the new cabinet on its first day. January 17, 1893, overthrow of the kingdom triggered by Colburn, Cornwell, Parker and Peterson refusing to support the queen's promulgation of a new constitution.	
Charles F. Creighton		Attorney General; November 1–8, 1892	Legislative "resolution of want of confidence" passed the legislature on November 1, 1892, ousting the new cabinet on its first day. Exiled for his part in the 1895 Wilcox rebellion to restore the monarchy. The son of Kalākaua's minister of foreign affairs Robert James Creighton	
John Adams Cummins		Minister of Foreign Affairs; Jan 29 – Feb 25, 1891	Hold-over from Kalākaua administration, until Liliʻuokalani installed Samuel Parker in the position	
Charles T. Gulick		Minister of the Interior; Aug 6, 1883 – June 30, 1886; Sept 12 – Oct 17, 1892; Nov 1– 8, 1892	Legislative "resolution of want of confidence" passed the legislature on November 1, 1892, ousting the new cabinet on its first day. Exiled for his part in the 1895 Wilcox rebellion to restore the monarchy.	
Peter Cushman Jones		Minister of Finance; Nov 8, 1892 – Jan 12, 1893	Legislative "resolution of want of confidence" passed the legislature on January 12, 1893, ousting the Wilcox cabinet	
Edward C. Macfarlane		Minister of Finance; Premier; Sept 12 – Oct 17, 1892	Legislative "resolution of want of confidence" passed the legislature on October 17, 1892	
John Mott-Smith		Minister of Finance; July 28 – Oct 17, 1891	Editor of the Hawaiian Gazette, and supporter of the monarchy.	
Joseph Nāwahī		Minister of Foreign Affairs; Nov 1– 8, 1892	Legislative "resolution of want of confidence" passed the legislature on November 1, 1892, ousting the new cabinet on its first day.	
Paul Neumann		Attorney General; Aug 29–30, 1892; Sept 12 – Oct 17, 1892	Legislative "resolution of want of confidence" passed the legislature on October 17, 1892	
Samuel Parker		Minister of Finance (acting); Mar 10 – June 28, 1891; Oct 17, 1891 – Jan 28 1892; Minister of Foreign Affairs; Feb 25, 1891– Nov 1, 1892; Jan 13–17, 1893	Jan 17 overthrow of the kingdom triggered by Colburn, Cornwell, Parker and Peterson refusing to support the queen's promulgation of a new constitution.	
Arthur P. Peterson		Attorney General; Jan 29– Feb 25, 1891; Jan 13–17, 1893	Hold-over from Kalākaua administration January 17 overthrow of the kingdom triggered by Colburn, Cornwell, Parker and Peterson refusing to support the queen's promulgation of a new constitution. Exiled for his part in the 1895 Wilcox rebellion to restore the monarchy.	
Mark P. Robinson		Minister of Foreign Affairs; Nov 8, 1892 – Jan 12, 1893	Legislative "resolution of want of confidence" passed the legislature on January 12, 1893, ousting the Wilcox cabinet	
Charles Nichols Spencer		Minister of the Interior; Jan 29, 1891 – Sept 12, 1892	Hold-over from Kalākaua administration	
William A. Whiting		Attorney General; Feb 25, 1891 – July 27, 1892	Resigned over conflict with Samuel Parker	
Hermann A. Widemann		Minister of Finance; Feb 25 – Mar 10,1891; July 28 – Sept 12, 1892	Justice of the Supreme Court; July 10, 1869 – Feb 18, 1874; Appointed by Kamehameha V Minister of the Interior under Kalākaua	
George Norton Wilcox		Minister of the Interior; Nov 8, 1892 – Jan 12, 1893	Legislative "resolution of want of confidence" passed the legislature on January 12, 1893, ousting the Wilcox cabinet	

== See also ==
- Cabinet of the Kingdom of Hawaii
- Kalākaua's Cabinet Ministers
- 1892 Legislative Session of the Kingdom of Hawaii
- Liliʻuokalani's Privy Council of State
- MOS Hawaii-related articles

== Bibliography ==
- Daws, Gavan (1968). Shoal of Time: A History of the Hawaiian Islands. Honolulu: University of Hawaii Press. OCLC 45815755.
- Kuykendall, Ralph Simpson (1967). The Hawaiian Kingdom 1874–1893, The Kalakaua Dynasty. Vol. 3. Honolulu: University of Hawaii Press. ISBN 978-0-87022-433-1. OCLC 500374815.
- Lydecker, Robert C. (1918). Rosters of Legislatures of Hawaii 1841–1918. The Honolulu Gazette Col., Ltd. p. 301.
- MacLennan, Carol A. (2014). Sovereign Sugar. Honolulu: University of Hawaii Press. ISBN 978-0-8248-3949-9 – via Project MUSE.
- Russ, William Adam (1959). The Hawaiian Revolution (1893–94). Selinsgrove, PA: Susquehanna University Press. ISBN 978-0-945636-53-3. OCLC 24846595.
