= Charles F. Creighton =

Kingdom of Hawaii official (1862–1907)

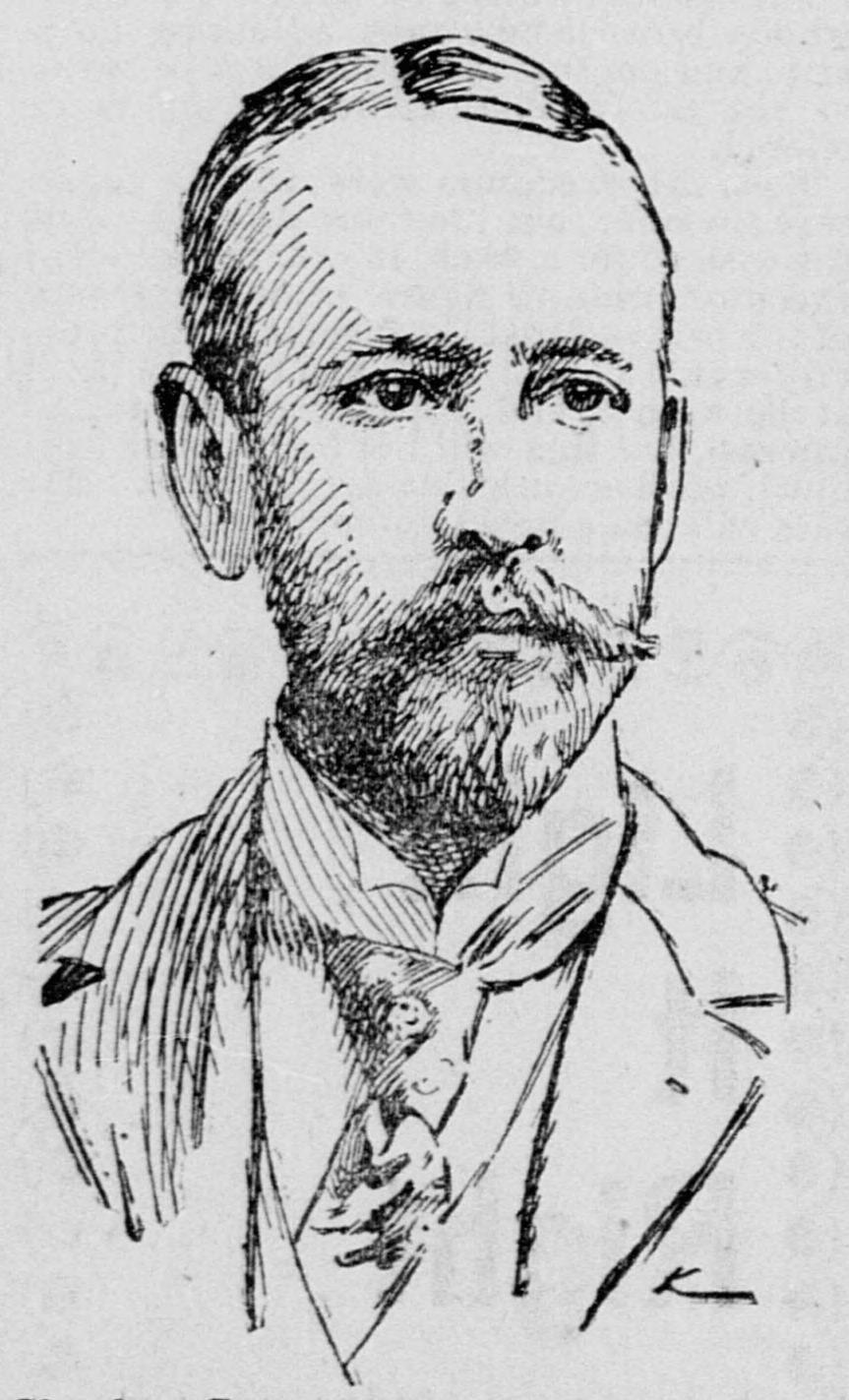

Kingdom of Hawaii Attorney General
- In office November 1, 1892 – November 8, 1892
- Monarch: Liliuokalani
- Preceded by: Paul Neumann
- Succeeded by: Cecil Brown

Personal details
- Born: 29 September 1863 Auckland, New Zealand
- Died: 25 November 1907 (aged 45) Territory of Hawaii
- Resting place: Oahu Cemetery

Charles F. Creighton (1863–1907) was a member of Queen Liliʻuokalani's Cabinet ministers as Attorney General of the Kingdom of Hawaii for the period November 1–8, 1892. Following the Overthrow of the Hawaiian Kingdom, he was arrested for his involvement in the 1895 Wilcox rebellion attempt to restore the monarchy. He accepted temporary exile to the United States to avoid a lengthy incarceration. His father Robert James Creighton had served as Kalākaua's Minister of Foreign Affairs.

== Background ==
Born in Auckland, New Zealand, he graduated from the Hastings College of the Law in San Francisco, California, and became a practicing attorney in Hawaii. His father Robert James Creighton had emigrated from Derry, Ireland at an early age. The elder Creighton had been an editor of the Honolulu Advertiser, was a close friend to the family of Claus Spreckels, and had been King Kalākaua's Minister of Foreign Affairs in 1886.

== Cabinet minister ==
The Bayonet Constitution that Kalākaua had been compelled to sign in 1887 allowed the monarch to appoint the cabinet, but transferred the power of their removal to the legislature alone. A legislative resolution of want of confidence would oust an entire cabinet. After her brother's funeral, the queen demanded the resignations of his ministers, causing a legal challenge when they refused. The case was decided in her favor by the Supreme Court of the kingdom.

The contentious general election of 1892 resulted in a divided legislature that dragged on for 171 days, during which the queen appointed multiple cabinets, only for them to be forced out by a legislative resolution of want of confidence. On November 1, 1892, the queen's cabinet appointments were Creighton as Attorney General, William H. Cornwell as Minister of Finance, Joseph Nawahi as Minister of Foreign Affairs, and Charles T. Gulick as Minister of the Interior. The legislature passed a resolution of want of confidence the same day, but adjourned before a new cabinet was appointed. A subsequent court case resulted in a ruling by the Supreme Court of the Hawaiian Islands that the cabinet was legally in place until the new cabinet replaced them on November 8.

The Cornwell cabinet lasted only one hour ... Without giving this cabinet any trial, they were immediately voted out.

— Liliʻuokalani,

== Wilcox rebellion ==
Creighton was a royalist who became embroiled in the January 1895 Wilcox rebellion to restore the monarchy after the Overthrow of the Hawaiian Kingdom. He and several others were never formally charged, but were placed in solitary confinement, during which they were treated well, fed well, and allowed outdoors to exercise. They broke under the mental strain of isolation. In an exchange for release from prison, all signed a document in February agreeing to the exile. They were not allowed to have a copy of the document. In appreciation of jailer J. A. Low's humane treatment of them, they presented him with a kauwila cane originally made for James H. Blount. They were issued passports, and 11 of them, including Creighton, left on the Australia. Spectators dressed in their finest attire arrived at the Oceanic wharf. A band played, and leis were presented to the departing exiles. Lorrin A. Thurston, who had been a key player in the overthrow of the Kingdom, and a leading proponent of annexation by the United States, characterized the exiles as, "...stirring up trouble among the kanakas [native Hawaiians]," and long associated with "...the most lawless elements at Honolulu." Creighton was among 10 individuals granted unconditional pardons in September and allowed to return to Hawaii.

== Repatriation ==
After Creighton's return to Honolulu, he resumed his legal practice. He died in his mother's home on November 25, 1907.

== Bibliography ==
- Kuykendall, Ralph Simpson (1967). The Hawaiian Kingdom 1874–1893, The Kalakaua Dynasty. Vol. 3. Honolulu: University of Hawaii Press. ISBN 978-0-87022-433-1. OCLC 500374815.
- Liliuokalani (1898). Hawaii's Story by Hawaii's Queen, Liliuokalani. Boston: Lee and Shepard. ISBN 978-0-548-22265-2. OCLC 2387226 – via HathiTrust.
