= Cabinet of the Hawaiian Kingdom =

Government body in Hawaiian Kingdom

The Cabinet of the Hawaiian Kingdom (Hawaiian: ʻAha Kuhina o ke Aupuni) was a body of the top executive officials appointed to advise the sovereign of the Hawaiian Kingdom from 1845 to 1893. The subsequent regimes of the Provisional Government and the Republic of Hawaii retained the structure of the cabinet (calling it an executive council) and minister positions under the presidency of Sanford B. Dole from 1893 until 1898.

== History ==
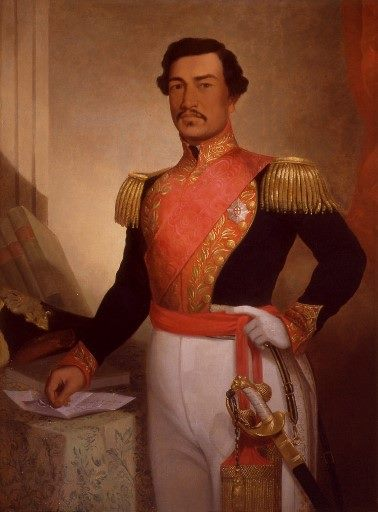
Kamehameha III, the first Hawaiian monarch to rule with a cabinet and a constitution

Prior to 1845, the king was advised by the Kuhina Nui (premier) and his Council of Chiefs (ʻAha Aliʻi). The first commission of a cabinet-level official was for American missionary Gerrit P. Judd who was appointed Secretary of State for Foreign Affairs on November 2, 1843 by Kamehameha III. An 1844 issue of The Polynesian noted the positions of Secretary of State for Foreign Affairs, Attorney General, and two Secretaries of the Treasury in the Privy Council of State. By 1845, the positions became known as ministers (kuhina). Judd had become "in fact, though not in name, a prime minister holding three portfolios", acting out the duties of the ministers of foreign affairs, finance and of the interior. He was later replaced as finance minister by Robert Crichton Wyllie and appointed interior minister on March 28, 1845 to alleviate his duties. Kamehameha III increasingly relied on American and British naturalized foreigners to fill executive council posts.

The cabinet with five ministries was officially formed after the passing of "An Act to Organize the Executive Ministry of the Hawaiian Islands" on October 29, 1845, in the Legislature, which formally outlined the appointment of cabinet ministers for the executive branch and the role of a privy council. The members of the cabinet consisted of the Minister of Foreign Affairs, Minister of the Interior (combined with the position of Kuhina Nui until 1855), Minister of Finance, and Attorney General. The royal cabinet ministers were also ex-officio members of the House of Nobles in the legislature and the Privy Council of State, the executive council of the monarch. Until 1855, a fifth ministry was headed by the Minister of Public Instruction. This was reorganized into the Board of Education which reported to the legislature through the interior ministry. The first cabinet appointed after the organic acts included Judd (as finance minister), Wyllie (as foreign ministers), John Ricord (as attorney general), William Richards (as public instruction minister), and the part-Hawaiian Keoni Ana (as Kuhina Nui and interior minister).

Subsequent Hawaiian constitutions in 1852, 1864 and 1887 outlined the role and duties of the cabinet ministry. The 1864 constitution proclaimed by King Kamehameha V abolished the position of Kuhina Nui and its role as the head of the cabinet. During the later years of the monarchy, the stability of cabinet appointments came into question with the appointment of questionable or unpopular candidates such as Celso Caesar Moreno and Walter Murray Gibson by King Kalākaua. Cabinets in this era were named after the de facto heads, usually but not always the foreign minister. The 1887 constitution forced upon Kalākaua increased the power of the cabinet (then known as the Reform Cabinet) at the expense of the monarch, who had to have the cabinet's consent for all executive actions except ministerial appointments and vetoes of legislation. It retained the monarch's right to appoint his or her own cabinet minister but gave the legislature the power to vote for the dismissal of the cabinet.

This constitution change proved especially problematic in the 1892–1893 legislative session where the retention of a stable cabinet was the main issue of contention between Queen Liliʻuokalani and the legislators. Seven resolutions of want of confidence were introduced during this session, and four of her self-appointed cabinets (the Widemann, Macfarlane, Cornwell, and Wilcox cabinets) were ousted by votes of the legislature. On January 13, 1893, after the legislature dismissed the Wilcox cabinet, Liliʻuokalani appointed the new Parker cabinet consisting of Samuel Parker, as minister of foreign affairs; John F. Colburn, as minister of the interior; William H. Cornwell, as minister of finance; and Arthur P. Peterson, as attorney general. These men had been specifically appointed to support her plan of promulgating a new constitution while the legislature was not in session. She attempted to promulgate a new constitution, but the cabinet ministers were either opposed to or reluctant to sign the new constitution. Their opposition was one of the causes which ultimately led to the Overthrow of the Hawaiian Kingdom on January 17, 1893.

== See also ==
- Privy Council of the Hawaiian Kingdom
- Legislature of the Hawaiian Kingdom
- Supreme Court of the Hawaiian Kingdom
- Kalākaua's Cabinet ministers
- Liliʻuokalani's Cabinet ministers

== Bibliography ==
- Alexander, William DeWitt (1896). History of Later Years of the Hawaiian Monarchy and the Revolution of 1893. Honolulu: Hawaiian Gazette Company. OCLC 11843616.
- Hawaii (1846). An Act to Organize the Executive Ministry of the Hawaiian Islands. Honolulu: Charles E. Hitchcock, Printer, Government Press. pp. 2–18. OCLC 16345195.
- Hawaii (1852). Constitution and Laws of His Majesty Kamehameha III., King of the Hawaiian Islands; Passed by the Nobles and Representatives at Their Session, 1852. Honolulu: Printed by Order of the Legislature. OCLC 17320934.
- Kuykendall, Ralph Simpson (1965) [1938]. The Hawaiian Kingdom 1778–1854, Foundation and Transformation. Vol. 1. Honolulu: University of Hawaii Press. ISBN 0-87022-431-X. OCLC 47008868.
- Kuykendall, Ralph Simpson (1953). The Hawaiian Kingdom 1854–1874, Twenty Critical Years. Vol. 2. Honolulu: University of Hawaii Press. ISBN 978-0-87022-432-4. OCLC 47010821.
- Kuykendall, Ralph Simpson (1967). The Hawaiian Kingdom 1874–1893, The Kalakaua Dynasty. Vol. 3. Honolulu: University of Hawaii Press. ISBN 978-0-87022-433-1. OCLC 500374815.
- "Members of the Hon. Privy Council of State". The Polynesian. Vol. 1, no. 9. Honolulu. July 20, 1844. p. 1. Archived from the original on December 22, 2015.
- Moblo, Pennie (1998). "Institutionalising the Leper: Partisan Politics and the Evolution of Stigma in Post-Monarchy Hawaiʻi". The Journal of the Polynesian Society. 107 (3). Wellington: The Polynesian Society: 229–262. OCLC 6015242891. Archived from the original on February 13, 2018.
- Newbury, Colin (2001). "Patronage and Bureaucracy in the Hawaiian Kingdom, 1840–1893". Pacific Studies. 24 (1–2). Laie, HI: Brigham Young University, Hawaii Campus: 1–38. ISSN 0275-3596. OCLC 193272210. Archived from the original on April 15, 2012.
- Osorio, Jon Kamakawiwoʻole (2002). Dismembering Lāhui: A History of the Hawaiian Nation to 1887. Honolulu: University of Hawaii Press. ISBN 0-8248-2549-7. OCLC 48579247.
- "A New Cabinet – Some New Ministers for the Public to Swallow". The Pacific Commercial Advertiser. Vol. XVII, no. 3277. Honolulu. January 14, 1893. p. 4. Archived from the original on January 9, 2017.
