= Charles Nichols Spencer =

Minister of Finance for the Kingdom of Hawaiʻi

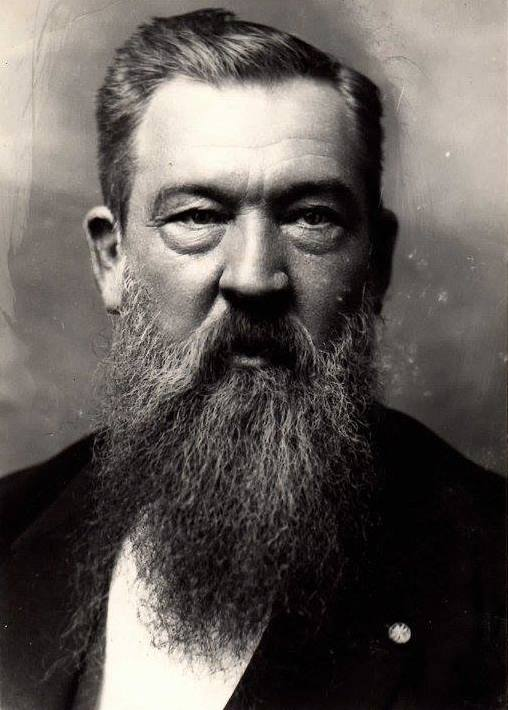

Kingdom of Hawaii Minister of the Interior
- In office June 17, 1890 – September 12, 1892
- Monarchs: Kalākaua; Liliʻuokalani
- Preceded by: Lorrin A. Thurston
- Succeeded by: Charles T. Gulick

Personal details
- Born: c. 1837 East Greenwich, Rhode Island
- Died: March 6, 1893 Honolulu
- Spouse: Annie E. Brown
- Occupation: Merchant

Charles Nichols Spencer (c. 1837 – March 6, 1893) was the Minister of Finance for the Kingdom of Hawaiʻi. He was one of Kalākaua's Cabinet ministers at the time of the king's January 20, 1891 death, and the longest hold-over into Liliʻuokalani's Cabinet ministers, serving June 17, 1890 – September 12, 1892.

== Background ==
Born in East Greenwich, Rhode Island, in 1853 he joined his brother Thomas in Hilo in the ship chandler trade. On the island of Hawaii, Charles and Thomas ran a general mercantile store, operated a sugar cane business, and engaged in the exporting of sugarcane and pulu.

The 7.9 magnitude 1868 Hawaii earthquake, also referred to as "The Great Ka`u Earthquake", occurred near the southern tip of the island of Hawaii. It triggered landslides, volcanic eruptions and a tsunami, destroying the economy on the island. As a result, the Spencer brothers relocated to Honolulu and continued in the mercantile trade.

Charles eventually formed a partnership with John Smith Walker and William G. Irwin, a business associate of Claus Spreckels, to operate the Hilea Sugar Plantation. The plantation was sold in 1879.

== Government service ==
During the reign of Kamehameha V, Spencer was appointed Commissioner of Fences. In 1875, he was appointed to the Private Ways and Water Rights Commission, as well as the Tax Appeal Board. Kalākaua appointed him Inspector-General of Immigrants with the Board of Immigration in 1887. In 1892, he was appointed Commissioner of Crown Lands.

Kalākaua installed a new cabinet on July 17, 1890, naming Spencer to replace Lorrin A. Thurston as Minister of the Interior. When Kalākaua died on January 20, 1891, Spencer remained in the cabinet post under Liliʻuokalani until September 12, 1892.

== Personal life and death ==
He died March 6, 1893, and was survived by his wife Annie E. Brown.

He was a right royal entertainer and had an agreeable and unaffected manner, and a stranger forming his acquaintance was at once made to feel at ease ... He was in all things a gentleman.

— obituary, The Hawaiian Gazette

== Bibliography ==
- Lydecker, Robert C. (1918). Roster legislatures of Hawaii, 1841–1918.: Constitutions of monarchy and republic, speeches of sovereign and President. Hawaiian Gazette Co. pp. 178, 182, 299 – via HathiTrust.
- Kuykendall, Ralph Simpson (1967). The Hawaiian Kingdom 1874–1893, The Kalakaua Dynasty. Vol. 3. Honolulu: University of Hawaii Press. ISBN 978-0-87022-433-1. OCLC 500374815.
