= Governors of Maui =

Royal governor of the Kingdom of Hawaii

The governor of Maui (Hawaiian: Kiaʻaina o Maui) was the royal governor or viceroy of the Island of Maui in the Kingdom of Hawaii. The governor of Maui resided at Lahaina and was usually a Hawaiian chief or prince and could even be a woman. The governor had authority over four of the eight islands: Maui, Molokaʻi, Lānaʻi, and Kahoʻolawe. It was up to the governor to appoint lieutenant governors to assist them. The governor had replaced the old Moʻi of Maui, but sovereignty remained with the king. The island governors were under the jurisdiction of the Ministers of the Interiors.

== Role ==
The 1840 Constitution of the Kingdom of Hawaii stated:

There shall be four governors over these Hawaiian Islands - one for Hawaiʻi - one for Maui and the Islands adjacent - one for Oʻahu, and one for Kauaʻi and the adjacent Islands. All the governors, from Hawaiʻi to Kauaʻi shall be subject to the King.

The prerogatives of the governors and their duties, shall be as follows: Each governor shall have the general direction of the several tax gatherers of his island, and shall support them in the execution of all their orders which he considers to have been properly given, but shall pursue a course according to law, and not according to his own private views. He also shall preside over all the judges of his island, and shall see their sentences executed as above. He shall also appoint the judges and give them their certificates of office.

All the governors, from Hawaiʻi to Kauaʻi shall be subject not only to the King, but also to the Premier.

The governor shall be the superior over his particular island or islands. He shall have charge of the munitions of war, under the direction of the King, however, and the Premier. He shall have charge of the forts, the soldiery, the arms and all the implements of war. He shall receive the government dues and shall deliver over the same to the Premier. All important decisions rest with him in times of emergency, unless the King or Premier be present. He shall have charge of all the King's business on the island, the taxation, new improvements to be extended, and plans for the increase of wealth, and all officers shall be subject to him. He shall also have power to decide all questions, and transact all island business which is not by law assigned to others.

When either of the governors shall decease, then all the chiefs shall assemble at such place as the King shall appoint, and shall nominate a successor of the deceased governor, and whosoever they shall nominate and be approved by the King, he shall be the new governor.

When Hawaii was annexed by the United States of America, the same islands became administered by the Maui County government.

== Abolishment ==
After King Kalākaua was forced to sign the Bayonet Constitution in 1887, the island governorships began to be viewed as wasteful expenses for the monarchy. The governors and governesses at the time (who were mainly royals or nobles) were also viewed as unfit to appoint the native police forces and condemned for "their refusal to accept their removal or reform by sheriffs or the marshal". The island governorships were abolished by two acts: the first act, on December 8, 1887, transferred the power of the police appointment to the island sheriffs, and the second, An Act To Abolish The Office Of Governor, which officially abolished the positions, on August 23, 1888. King Kalākaua refused to approve the 1888 act, but his veto was overridden by two-thirds of the legislature. These positions were restored under the An Act To Establish A Governor On Each Of The Islands Of Oahu, Maui, Hawaii and Kauai on November 14, 1890, with the effective date of January 1, 1891. One significant change was this act made it illegal for a woman to be governor ending the traditional practice of appointing female royals and nobles as governess. Kalākaua died prior to reappointing any of the island governors, but his successor Liliuokalani restored the positions at different dates between 1891 and 1892. After the overthrow of the Kingdom of Hawaii, the Provisional Government of Hawaii repealed the 1890 act and abolished these positions on February 28, 1893 for the final time.

== List of governors of Maui ==
Name	Picture	Birth	Death	Assumed office	Left office	Notes	Monarch
Keʻeaumoku Pāpaʻiahiahi		c. 1736	March 21, 1804	c. 1795	March 21, 1804		Kamehameha I
George Cox Kahekili Keʻeaumoku II		c. 1784	March 23, 1824	March 21, 1804	March 23, 1824		Kamehameha I
George Cox Kahekili Keʻeaumoku II		c. 1784	March 23, 1824	March 21, 1804	March 23, 1824		Kamehameha II
Kahakuhaʻakoi Wahine Piʻo			c. 1826	c. 1824	c. 1826??		Kamehameha III
Ulumāheihei Hoapili		c. 1776	January 3, 1840	c. 1826???	January 3, 1840		Kamehameha III
Hoapiliwahine Kalākua Kaheiheimālie		c. 1778	January 16, 1842	January 3, 1840	January 16, 1842	Governor Hoapili's widow	Kamehameha III
James Young Kānehoa		August 7, 1797	October 1, 1851	c. 1842	October 1, 1851		Kamehameha III
Paul Nahaolelua		c. 1806	September 15, 1875	December 3, 1852	February 3, 1874	Governor Kānehoa's Deputy	Kamehameha III
Paul Nahaolelua		c. 1806	September 15, 1875	December 3, 1852	February 3, 1874	Governor Kānehoa's Deputy	Kamehameha IV
Paul Nahaolelua		c. 1806	September 15, 1875	December 3, 1852	February 3, 1874	Governor Kānehoa's Deputy	Kamehameha V
Paul Nahaolelua		c. 1806	September 15, 1875	December 3, 1852	February 3, 1874	Governor Kānehoa's Deputy	Lunalilo
John Mākini Kapena		1843	October 23, 1887	February 23, 1874	1876	Luther Aholo served as acting governor from November 1874 to February 1875	Kalākaua
William Luther Kealiʻi Moehonua		May 5, 1824	September 8, 1878	December 15, 1876	September 8, 1878		Kalākaua
John Owen Dominis		March 10, 1832	August 27, 1891	September 9, 1878	c. 1886	Luther Aholo served as lieutenant governor.	Kalākaua
Robert Hoapili Baker		c. 1847	April 4, 1900	October 4, 1886	August 23, 1888		Kalākaua
Interregnum
Thomas Wright Everett		November 4, 1823	September 4, 1895	May 17, 1892	February 28, 1893	previously Sheriff of Maui	Liliʻuokalani

== See also ==
- List of governors of Hawaii
  - Governors of Hawaiʻi (island)
  - Governors of Kauaʻi
  - Governors of Oʻahu
- Moʻi of Maui
- Mayor of Maui
