= Luther Aholo =

Hawaiian politician (c. 1833 – 1888)

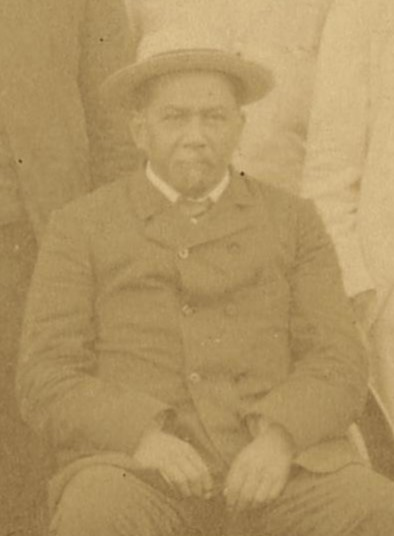
- Aholo in 1886

Vice President of the Legislative Assembly
- In office 1876 – October 13, 1886
- Preceded by: Simon Kaloa Kaai
- Succeeded by: John Kauhane

Kingdom of Hawaii Minister of the Interior
- In office October 13, 1886 – July 1, 1887
- Preceded by: Walter M. Gibson
- Succeeded by: Lorrin A. Thurston

Personal details
- Born: c. 1833
- Died: March 16, 1888 (aged 55) Honolulu, Oahu, Kingdom of Hawaii
- Resting place: Kawaiahaʻo Church
- Spouse(s): Kahelepu; Keahi; Lilia
- Children: Samuel, Petuela, Ioane. James Luther, Lydia, Willie

Luther Aholo (c. 1833 – March 16, 1888) was a politician who served many political posts in the Kingdom of Hawaii. He served multiple terms as a legislator from Maui and Minister of the Interior from 1886 to 1887. Considered one of the leading Hawaiian politicians of his generation, his skills as an orator were compared to those of the Ancient Greek statesman Solon.

== Life and political career ==
Aholo was born in 1833, on the island of Maui. He served as a teacher at the Lahainaluna Seminary and later became a lawyer and a judge. He worked as a tax assessor for the island of Maui. Regarded as a hardworking advisor and a gentleman with "brains and ability," he had a long and distinguished political career.

Aholo was elected multiple time as a member of the House of Representatives, the lower house of the legislature of the kingdom, for the district of Lahaina, on the island of Maui. He sat as a representative during the legislative assemblies of 1860, 1866, 1867 and all the sessions from 1870 to 1886. From 1876 to 1886, he presided as Vice President of the Legislative Assembly until resigning on October 13, 1886 to join the cabinet of King Kalākaua. Regarded a highly-abled orator and legislators, he was referred by some as the "Solon of the House", after the Ancient Greek statesman Solon. According to later testimony of Charles T. Gulick in the Blount Report, Aholo and his contemporary George Washington Pilipō were considered "some of the brightest [native leaders] then living...in the house".

Aholo was one of the six legislators in the extra legislative session of 1874, who voted for Queen Emma instead of the victor Kalākaua, although he would eventually reconcile with the king. From November 1874 to February 1875, Aholo served as Acting Governor of Maui while Governor John Mākini Kapena traveled with Kalākaua on his state visit to the United States. He also worked as a clerk, private secretary and lieutenant governor of Maui under John Owen Dominis while Dominis was Governor of Maui from 1878 to 1886. He became a friend of Dominis' wife, Princess Liliʻuokalani, who adopted his daughter Lydia Kaʻonohiponiponiokalani Aholo.

Aholo was appointed as a member of King Kalākaua's Privy Council of State on August 12, 1884. In his capacity as Privy Councilor, Aholo and William DeWitt Alexander, the Surveyor-General, represented the Kingdom of Hawaii at the International Meridian Conference, held in Washington, DC, in October 1884. Aholo and Alexander were among the forty-one delegates from twenty-six different nations assembled at the meeting. This conference resulted in the selection of the Greenwich Meridian as an international standard for zero degrees longitude.

In 1886, the king appointed him as Postmaster General of the Kingdom, a position he held from July 31, 1886 to October 15, 1886. After Walter M. Gibson resigned to become Minister of Foreign Affairs, Kalākaua appointed him as his successor as Minister of the Interior on October 13, 1886. Aholo was a supporter of the administration headed by Gibson, which was highly controversial and unpopular with many missionary descendants in the kingdom. From October 22, 1886 to November 15, 1886, he also served as acting Attorney General of Hawaii between the resignation of John Lot Kaulukou and the appointment of Antone Rosa. Following the signing of the Bayonet Constitution of 1887, which limited the king's executed power, Aholo was forced to resign along with the rest of the Gibson regime and replaced by Lorrin A. Thurston and the so called Reform cabinet.

For his service to the monarchy, he was created a Knight Companion of the Royal Order of Kalākaua and a Grand Officer of the Royal Order Crown of Hawaii. Aholo died on March 16, 1888, at Washington Place, the private residence of Governor Dominis and Princess Liliʻuokalani in Honolulu. He was fifty-five years old. The cause of death was described as aneurysm or disease of the heart. A funeral was held from his Beretania Street residence was he buried at the cemetery of Kawaiahaʻo Church.

== Personal life ==
Aholo married three times. With his first wife, Kahelepu, he had three children, Samuel, Petuela, and Ioane Aholo. With his second wife Keahi, he had a son named James Luther (1870–1910) and a daughter named Lydia Kaʻonohiponiponiokalani Aholo (1878–1979), who became the namesake and hānai daughter of the future Queen Liliʻuokalani. Keahi died on February 12, 1878, six days after the birth of their daughter, With his third and final wife Lilia, he had a son named Willie. During the Native Hawaiian opposition to the overthrow, Lilia served as secretary of Hui Aloha ʻĀina o Na Wahine (Hawaiian Women's Patriotic League), which petitioned against annexation. One of his great-grandsons was Alfred Apaka, a baritone singer who popularized romantic Hawaiian ballads during the 1950s.

== Bibliography ==
- Allen, Helena G. (1982). The Betrayal of Liliuokalani: Last Queen of Hawaii, 1838–1917. Glendale, CA: A. H. Clark Company. ISBN 978-0-87062-144-4. OCLC 9576325.
- Blount, James Henderson (1895). The Executive Documents of the House of Representatives for the Second Session of the Fifty-Third Congress, 1893–'94 in Thirty-One Volumes. Washington, DC: U.S. Government Printing Office. OCLC 191710879.
- Bonura, Sandra; Witmer, Sally (2013). "Lydia K. Aholo — Her Story Recovering the Lost Voice". The Hawaiian Journal of History. 47. Honolulu: Hawaiian Historical Society: 103–145. hdl:10524/36266. OCLC 60626541.
- Hawaii (1918). Lydecker, Robert Colfax (ed.). Roster Legislatures of Hawaii, 1841–1918. Honolulu: Hawaiian Gazette Company. OCLC 60737418.
- International Meridian Conference (1884). International Conference Held at Washington for the Purpose of Fixing a Prime Meridian and a Universal Day: October, 1884. Protocols of the Proceedings. Washington, DC: Gibson Bros. OCLC 1405420.
- Kuykendall, Ralph Simpson (1967). The Hawaiian Kingdom 1874–1893, The Kalakaua Dynasty. Vol. 3. Honolulu: University of Hawaii Press. ISBN 978-0-87022-433-1. OCLC 500374815.
- Liliuokalani (1898). Hawaii's Story by Hawaii's Queen, Liliuokalani. Boston: Lee and Shepard. ISBN 978-0-548-22265-2. OCLC 2387226.
- Osorio, Jon Kamakawiwoʻole (2002). Dismembering Lāhui: A History of the Hawaiian Nation to 1887. Honolulu: University of Hawaii Press. ISBN 0-8248-2549-7. OCLC 48579247.
- Schmitt, Robert C.; Cox, Doak C. (1992). "Hawaiian Time". The Hawaiian Journal of History. 26. Honolulu: Hawaiian Historical Society: 207–225. hdl:10524/239. OCLC 60626541.
- Silva, Noenoe K. (2004). Aloha Betrayed: Native Hawaiian Resistance to American Colonialism. Durham: Duke University Press. ISBN 0-8223-8622-4. OCLC 191222123.
