= John T. Dare =

American attorney and politician (c. 1840s – 1912)

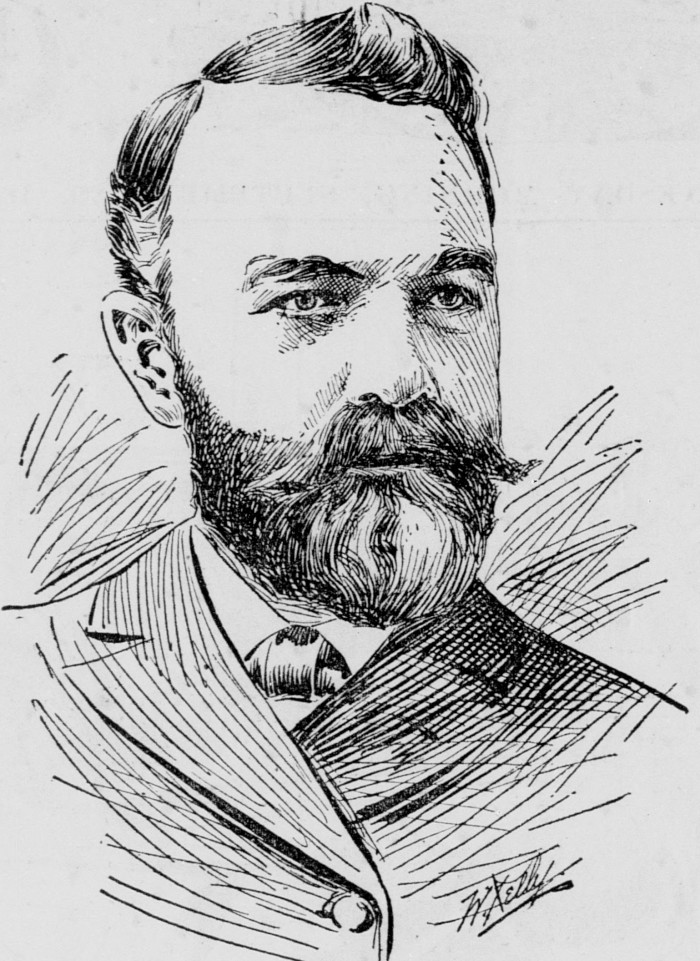
John T. Dare

John Thomas Dare (c. 1840s – December 15, 1912) was a politician, who briefly served in the House of Representatives for the Territory of Arizona, the California State Assembly, and as Attorney General of the Kingdom of Hawaii. He was born in Suffolk County, New York sometime between 1842 and 1844. The exact year varies by source.

His professional background also varies by source, with some sources saying he hired on a ship as a teenager and sailed to San Francisco. He is also reputed to have established the Pony Express in Arizona, and operated a "milling" business.

== Arizona ==
On December 25, 1890, The Morning Call newspaper of San Francisco published a several-page layout of the notable men of the area. In the category of notable legal professionals, it lists John Thomas Dare as having been born in 1843, and at age 14 becoming a sailor. Recounting that he moved to Arizona in 1863, it correctly lists his service in the territory's legislature. In 1867, he successfully ran as a Democrat for a seat from Yavapai County for the Arizona Territory House of Representatives. The story is unsupported by facts when it reports that Dare instituted the Pony Express in Arizona during this time period. The Pony Express existed only April 1860 to October 1861, and never operated in Arizona. His later obituary in the Weekly Journal-Miner in Prescott, stated that he had a business connection with a stagecoach line between Prescott and Santa Fe, New Mexico.

== Hawaii ==
According to historian Ralph Simpson Kuykendall, Dare had worked as the Assistant District Attorney of San Francisco, and was legal counsel for Claus Spreckels. In May 1886, Dare moved his family to Hawaii. After presenting credentials as "first assistant to the City and County of San Francisco", and "letters of patent and denization" from Kalākaua, he was admitted to practice law in the Kingdom of Hawaii. Dare's appointment as Attorney General of Hawaii on July 1, as well as that of other appointed officials associated with Spreckels, was seen by some as part of a larger problem of Prime Minister Walter Murray Gibson catering to private interests. After much public opposition to Gibson's regime, Dare exited from his cabinet position on October 13 and returned to California.

== California ==
In 1877–1880, Dare represented San Francisco as a Republican in the California State Assembly. He was an alternate delegate to the 1892 Republican National Convention in Minneapolis.

US President William McKinley appointed Dare as Custom House Appraiser for San Francisco in 1897. He had been endorsed by John D. Spreckels, son of Claus. The San Francisco Call gave Dare's birth date as 1844, and made no mention of Arizona. The newspaper stated that he had arrived in Vallejo California directly from a sea voyage from New York, and began working as manual labor on a railroad. His later obituary in that same newspaper stated that he opened a "milling" business in Vallejo, but it's not clear if that was milling of ores, or cloth. From Vallejo, the newspaper stated that he relocated to San Francisco and took up the study of law. Upon his later return from Hawaii, he became a prosecuting attorney, and also served as Deputy Collector of the Port of San Francisco.

== Death ==
Dare died in San Francisco December 15, 1912. His obituary lists his date of birth as 1842. He had a widow and three daughters. The Honolulu Star-Bulletin referred to him as "King Claus's Protege", and made note of several erroneous statements made by California media in their coverage of his background.

== Bibliography ==
- Kuykendall, Ralph Simpson (1967). The Hawaiian Kingdom 1874–1893, The Kalakaua Dynasty. Vol. 3. Honolulu: University of Hawaii Press. ISBN 978-0-87022-433-1. OCLC 500374815.
