= William Luther Moehonua =

American politician (1824–1878)

The Honourable William Luther Moehonua
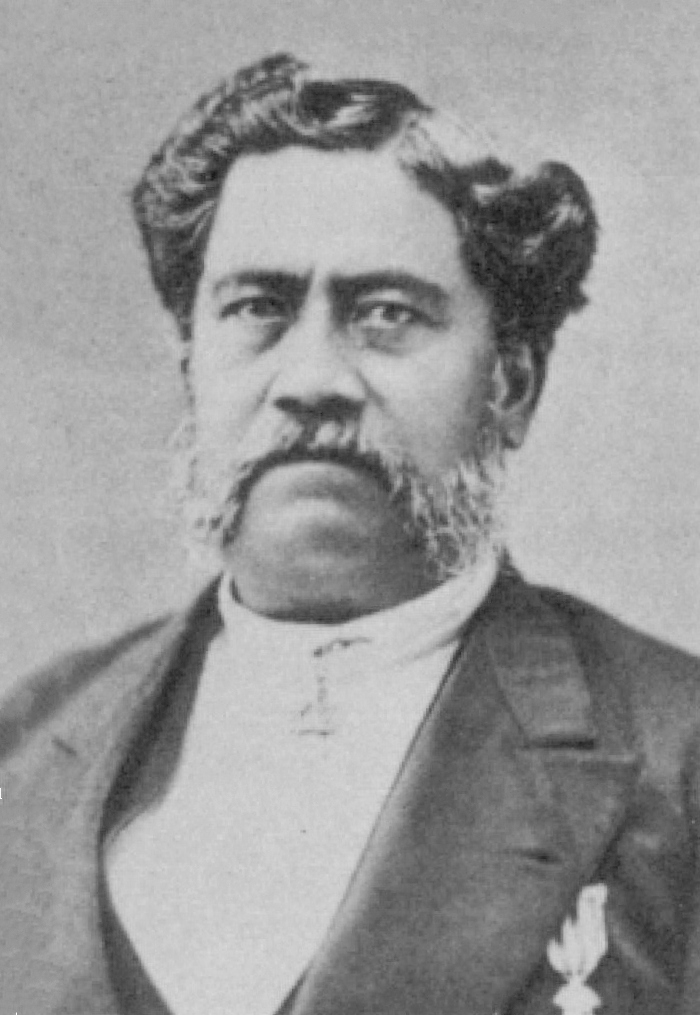
- Photo of William Luther Moehonua, circa. 1878

Ministry of the Interior
- In office October 31, 1874 – December 5, 1876
- Monarch: Kalākaua
- Preceded by: William L. Green
- Succeeded by: John Mott-Smith

Governor of Maui
- In office December 15, 1876 – September 8, 1878
- Monarch: Kalākaua
- Deputy: Abraham Fornander
- Preceded by: John Mākini Kapena
- Succeeded by: John Owen Dominis

Personal details
- Born: William Luther Kealiʻi Moehonua; May 5, 1824 Mokulēʻia, Waialua district, Kingdom of Hawaii
- Died: September 8, 1878 (aged 54) Honolulu, Kingdom of Hawaiʻi
- Spouse(s): Kaunuohua; Lucy Muolo; Kapeka Kahele
- Occupation: Politician

William Luther Kealiʻi Moehonua (May 5, 1824 – September 8, 1878) was a native Hawaiian noble and politician in the Kingdom of Hawaii.

== Life ==
Moehonua was born May 5, 1824, in Mokulēʻia. His mother was Mary Napuaelua. There is some dispute about his father. Some sources give it as Keaweamahi. Others say his father was ʻAikanaka (1790–1868), who had slept with his mother about the same time. Around 1848 he married Kaunuohua, a noble who was attendant to King Kamehameha IV. On September 11, 1849, he married Lucy Muolo who died in 1865, and remarried to Kapeka Kahele in 1875. His probable half-sister Analea Keohokālole became a civil leader in her own right.

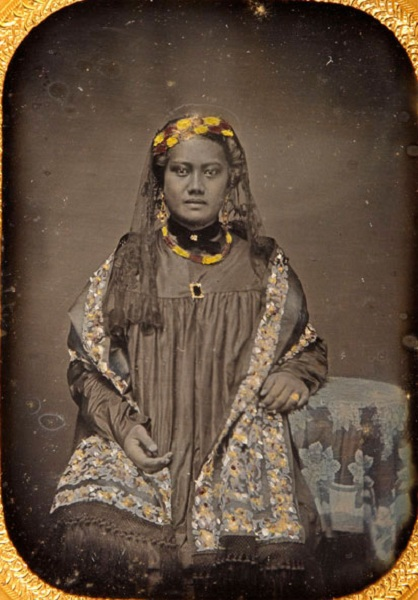
His second wife Lucy Muolo Moehonua

On February 6, 1873, Moehonua was given the rank of Major in the royal guard of King Lunalilo. On September 10, 1873, Moehonua was put in command of ʻIolani Barracks after a mutiny against their Hungarian-born commander. He was elected to the Legislature of the Hawaiian Kingdom of 1874 as a representative for Oʻahu island.

Lunalilo died after reigning for only one year without naming an heir, so the legislature according to the constitution was to elect a new king. Moehonua and Samuel Gardner Wilder counted the ballots and announced the results. The winner was Kalākaua, who was probably a nephew since Kalākaua's grandfather ʻAikanaka was (probably) Moehonua's father. Moehonua was injured when his carriage was torn apart in the protests that followed, since Queen Emma of Hawaii was favored by the Hawaiian people. On April 27, 1874, he was promoted to rank of Colonel. On October 31, 1874, he was appointed minister of the interior, until December 5, 1876 when he was replaced by John Mott-Smith. He became commissioner of the crown lands November 20, 1875.

On December 15, 1876, Moehonua was appointed Royal Governor of Maui. On April 15, 1878 he was appointed to the upper House of Nobles of the legislature. He died September 8, 1878, aged 54, in Honolulu. He was replaced as Maui governor by John Owen Dominis, who was married to Lydia Kamakaeha, later Queen Liliʻuokalani. He was granted much land for his service, although some had to be sold to satisfy his debts by executor Charles T. Gulick. He probably had at least one child: Kalākaua filed a lawsuit which reached the supreme court in 1883, claiming some land that G. W. Keaweamahi had inherited from Moehonua. The court ruled against the king.

In her autobiography, Liliʻuokalani, who may have been unaware or indifferent, downplays his family background, not mentioning if they were related:

He was a most estimable man, far superior to many of a corresponding rank, which was not of the highest; yet he was a good specimen of the Hawaiian race, of noble birth and patriotic sentiments.

Government offices
Preceded by William L. Green	Kingdom of Hawaii Minister of Interior; 1874–1876	Succeeded by John Mott-Smith
Preceded by John Mākini Kapena	Royal Governor of Maui; 1876–1878	Succeeded by John Owen Dominis
