= Jonathan Austin (Hawaii official) =

Jonathan Austin (November 7, 1830 – December 7, 1892) was a veteran of the American Civil War, president of Paukaa Sugar Company, and Minister of Foreign Affairs for the Kingdom of Hawaii during the reign of Kalākaua.

== Background ==
Born in Greenfield, New York, he was a law student before moving to Hawaii. During the American Civil War, he returned to his native state and enlisted with the rank of captain in the 78th New York Volunteer Infantry. At the time of his 1863 discharge, he held the rank of lieutenant colonel. Austin returned to Hawaii, where he practiced law and became president of Paukaa Sugar Company.

== Cabinet post ==
Kalākaua's cabinet under the helm of Walter Murray Gibson was more a body of enablers than political advisors. Grandiose schemes and reckless spending, in response to increased revenue from the Reciprocity Treaty of 1875, spiraled out of control. On October 17, 1882, Austin was part of a committee of The Planters' Labor and Supply Company who addressed concerns in a written statement to Kalākaua. The planters were brushed off in a published reply from Gibson, rather than any comment from the king. In 1887, Kalākaua was forced to sign the Bayonet Constitution, codifying the legislature as the supreme authority over any actions by the monarchy. Austin had been one of the committee who drafted the new law.

The Gibson cabinet was effectively dissolved on July 1, ushering in the so-called Reform Cabinet. Minister of Foreign Affairs Godfrey Brown resigned from the new cabinet on December 28, replaced by Austin. The entire Reform Cabinet eventually fell to internal discord, replaced with a new cabinet by Kalākaua on June 17, 1890.

Austin retreated to San Francisco, with the intent of eventually returning to Hawaii. Upon arrival, he gave an interview to the San Francisco Call detailing the political upheaval happening to the monarchy. Another interview that appeared in the Buffalo Commercial newspaper, was very complimentary of Kalākaua as a person. He praised native Hawaiians for their aquatic athleticism, and their musical culture.

== Personal life ==
Austin died in Honolulu on December 7, 1892, and was survived by daughters Sarah E. Austin and Mrs. Oscar White.

His wife Nancy preceded him in death in 1888.

== Bibliography ==
- Dole, Sanford B. (1936). Farrell, Andrew (ed.). Memoirs of the Hawaiian Revolution. Honolulu: Advertiser Publishing Company. OCLC 4823270 – via HathiTrust.
- Kuykendall, Ralph Simpson (1967). The Hawaiian Kingdom 1874–1893, The Kalakaua Dynasty. Vol. 3. Honolulu: University of Hawaii Press. ISBN 978-0-87022-433-1. OCLC 500374815.
- Lydecker, Robert C. (1918). Rosters of Legislatures of Hawaii 1841–1918. The Honolulu Gazette Col., Ltd. p. 301.
- Thurston, Lorrin A. (1936). Memoirs of the Hawaiian Revolution. Honolulu Advertiser Publishing – via HathiTrust.
