= Godfrey Brown (politician) =

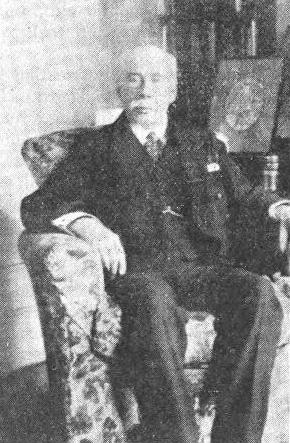

Kingdom of Hawaii Minister of Foreign Affairs
- In office July 1, 1887 – December 28, 1887
- Monarch: Kalākaua
- Preceded by: Walter Murray Gibson
- Succeeded by: John Adams Cummins

Kingdom of Hawaii Minister of Finance
- In office July 17, 1890 – February 25, 1891
- Monarchs: Kalākaua, Liliʻuokalani
- Preceded by: Samuel Mills Damon
- Succeeded by: Hermann A. Widemann

Personal details
- Born: c. 1838 Slough, England
- Died: January 9, 1928 England

Godfrey Brown (c. 1838 – January 9, 1928) was Minister of Foreign Affairs under King Kalākaua and Minister of Finance and under both Kalākaua and Liliʻuokalani.

== Background ==
Godfrey Brown was born about 1838 in Slough, near Windsor Castle in England, to landscape gardener Thomas Brown and his wife Mary Ann Rhodes. His maternal grandfather Godfrey Rhodes was a bank executive, and his maternal uncle also bore the name Godfrey. His father's ill health precipitated a relocation to Hawaii in 1844, by way of a six-month sea voyage around the Falkland Islands. At the time of the voyage, Godfrey had an older brother Arthur, and younger siblings Alice, Frank and Malcolm. Three maternal aunts Annie Rhodes Covington, Sarah Rhodes Pfister and Susannah Rhodes Robinson made the relocation to Hawaii with the Brown family. Brother Cecil Brown was born in 1850 at Wailua, Kauai County, Hawaii.

== Hawaii ==
Youngest brother Cecil Brown was born in 1850 in Hawaii. All brothers except Cecil were schooled in New England, after which Godfrey worked for a while in New York, followed by employment in British Columbia, and an eventual return to Hawaii. Godfrey and Cecil became financial officers of the Hawaiian Hardware Company.

== Legislative career ==
For the 1878 Legislature of the Kingdom of Hawaii, Brown was Secretary of the Legislative Assembly, an appointed position to record the proceedings. He was elected as a Representative for the 1884 session.

The House of Nobles were appointed by the monarch, and included the cabinet positions. Brown was a member of the Nobles for the 1887 session in his position as Minister of Foreign Affairs, and for the 1890 session in his position as Minister of Finance. Both positions were appointments of Kalākaua. When Liliʻuokalani ascended to the throne upon the death of Kalākaua, she demanded the resignation of his entire cabinet.

== Death ==
Brown remained in business for many years in Hawaii, as an officer with both the Hawaiian Electric Company and the Hawaiian Bell Telephone Company. In 1894, he replaced Samuel Mills Damon as manager of a Honolulu bank when a San Francisco company acquired the bank's shares from founder Charles Reed Bishop.

He spent his final years in England, and died there in 1928 at the age of 90.

== Bibliography ==
- Brown, Malcolm (1918). Reminiscences of a Pioneer Kauai Family, with References and Anecdotes of Early Honolulu. Honolulu: Thos. McVeagh. OCLC 16342752 – via HathiTrust.
- Kuykendall, Ralph Simpson (1967). The Hawaiian Kingdom 1874–1893, The Kalakaua Dynasty. Vol. 3. Honolulu: University of Hawaii Press. ISBN 978-0-87022-433-1. OCLC 500374815.
- Lydecker, Robert C. (1918). Roster legislatures of Hawaii, 1841-1918.: Constitutions of monarchy and republic, speeches of sovereign and President. Hawaiian Gazette Co. – via HathiTrust.
