= Ministry of the Interior (Hawaii) =

Office in the Kingdom of Hawaii

Interior Minister of the Kingdom (Republic) of Hawaii Kuhina Kalaianaina
- Flag of Hawaii
- Appointer: Monarchs of Hawaii; President of Hawaii
- Inaugural holder: Gerrit P. Judd
- Formation: 1845

The Minister of the Interior (Hawaiian: Kuhina Kalaianaina) was a powerful office in the Kingdom of Hawaii, the Provisional Government of Hawaii and the Republic of Hawaii from 1845 to 1900. It made up one of the four offices of the monarchical or presidential cabinet which advised the Head of State of Hawaii on executive affairs. During the monarchy, ministers were also ex-officio members of the Privy Council and the House of Nobles in the legislature. During the republic, ministers were ex-officio members of both houses of the legislature. The head of state had the power to appoint the ministers but later Hawaiian constitutions limited the power the head of state had in removing the cabinet ministers by requiring a vote of no confidence from a majority of the elective members of the legislature. All acts of the head of state had to be countersigned by a minister.

== Ministers of the Interior ==
#	Name	Picture	Birth	Death	Assumed office	Left office	Notes	Head of state
1	Gerrit Parmele Judd		April 23, 1803	July 12, 1873	March 26, 1845	March 4, 1846		Kamehameha III
2	John Kalaipaihala Young II		March 12, 1810	July 18, 1857	March 4, 1846	June 6, 1857	Served as Kuhina Nui from 1845 to 1855	Kamehameha III, Kamehameha IV
3	Lot Kapuāiwa		December 11, 1830	December 11, 1872	June 6, 1857	December 24, 1863	Resigned and became King	Kamehameha IV
4	George Morison Robertson		February 26, 1821	March 12, 1867	December 24, 1863	February 18, 1864		Kamehameha V
5	Charles Gordon Hopkins		1822	1886	February 18, 1864	April 26, 1865		Kamehameha V
6	Ferdinand William Hutchison		circa 1819	May 20, 1893	April 26, 1865	January 10, 1873		Kamehameha V, Lunalilo
7	Edwin Oscar Hall		October 21, 1810	September 19, 1883	January 10, 1873	February 17, 1874		Lunalilo, Kalākaua
8	Hermann Adam Widemann		December 24, 1822	February 7, 1899	February 17, 1874	May 28, 1874		Kalākaua
9	William Lowthian Green		September 13, 1819	December 7, 1890	May 28, 1874	October 31, 1874	acting	Kalākaua
10	William Luther Moehonua		May 5, 1824	September 8, 1878	October 31, 1874	December 5, 1876		Kalākaua
11	John Mott-Smith		November 25, 1824	August 10, 1895	December 5, 1876	July 3, 1878		Kalākaua
12	Samuel Gardner Wilder		June 20, 1831	July 28, 1888	July 3, 1878	August 14, 1880		Kalākaua
13	John Edward Bush		February 15, 1842	June 28, 1906	August 14, 1880	September 27, 1880	1st term	Kalākaua
14	Henry Alpheus Peirce Carter		August 7, 1837	November 1, 1891	September 27, 1880	May 20, 1882		Kalākaua
15	Simon Kaloa Kaʻai		-	March 22, 1884	May 20, 1882	August 8, 1882		Kalākaua
16	John Edward Bush		February 15, 1842	June 28, 1906	August 8, 1882	May 14, 1883	2nd term	Kalākaua
17	Walter Murray Gibson		March 6, 1822	January 21, 1888	May 14, 1883	August 6, 1883 (acting from July 6)	1st term (acting from July 6)	Kalākaua
18	Charles Thomas Gulick		June, 1841	November 7, 1897	August 6, 1883	June 30, 1886	1st term	Kalākaua
19	Walter Murray Gibson		March 6, 1822	January 21, 1888	June 30, 1886	October 13, 1886	2nd term	Kalākaua
20	Luther Aholo		c. 1833	March 16, 1888	October 13, 1886	July 1, 1887		Kalākaua
21	Lorrin Andrews Thurston		July 31, 1858	May 11, 1931	July 1, 1887	September 27, 1888	1st term	Kalākaua
22	Jonathan Austin		November 7, 1829	December 7, 1892	September 27, 1888	October 27, 1888	acting	Kalākaua
23	Lorrin Andrews Thurston		July 31, 1858	May 11, 1931	October 27, 1888	June 17, 1890	2nd term	Kalākaua
24	Charles Nichols Spencer		1837	March 6, 1893	June 17, 1890	September 12, 1892		Kalākaua, Liliuokalani
25	Charles Thomas Gulick		June, 1841	November 7, 1897	September 12, 1892	November 1, 1892	2nd term	Liliuokalani
26	George Norton Wilcox		August 15, 1839	January 21, 1933	November 8, 1892	January 12, 1893		Liliuokalani
27	John Francis Colburn		September 30, 1859	March 16, 1920	January 13, 1893	January 17, 1893		Liliuokalani
28	James Anderson King		December 4, 1832	October 16, 1899	January 17, 1893	March 4, 1898		President Dole
29	Henry Ernest Cooper		August 28, 1857	May 15, 1929	March 4, 1898	July 1, 1898	acting	President Dole
30	James Anderson King		December 4, 1832	October 16, 1899	July 1, 1898	October 16, 1899		President Dole
31	Alexander Young		December 14, 1833	July 2, 1910	October 27, 1899	May 18, 1900		President Dole

== See also ==
- Cabinet of the Kingdom of Hawaii

Other members of the Hawaiian Cabinet

- Ministry of Finance (Hawaii)
- Ministry of Foreign Affairs (Hawaii)
- Ministry of Public Instruction (Hawaii)
- Attorney General of Hawaii

== Sources ==
- Cahoon, Benl (ed.). "Hawaiian Governments 1795-1900". worldstatesmen.org.
- William Fremont Blackman (1906). "Appendix A. List of Hawaiian Officials". The Making of Hawaii: a Study in Social Evolution. The Macmillan Company. pp. 241–243.
- Newbury, Colin (2001). "Patronage and Bureaucracy in the Hawaiian Kingdom, 1840–1893". Pacific Studies. 24 (1–2). Laie, HI: Brigham Young University, Hawaii Campus: 1–38. OCLC 607265842. Archived from the original on April 15, 2012.
- Thomas G. Thrum (1890). "A List of All the Cabinet Ministers Who Have Held Office in the Hawaiian Kingdom". All about Hawaii. Honolulu: Honolulu Star-Bulletin. pp. 92–97.
