= John Mott-Smith =

Hawaiian politician

The Honourable John Mott-Smith
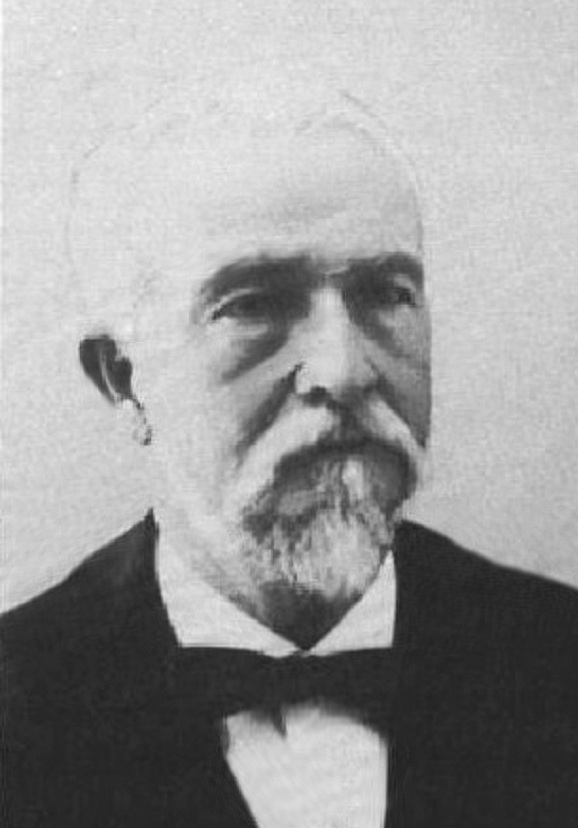

Minister of Finance
- In office December 21, 1869 – August 25, 1872
- Monarch: Kamehameha V
- Preceded by: Charles Coffin Harris
- Succeeded by: Robert Stirling
- In office July 28, 1891 – October 17, 1891
- Monarch: Liliʻuokalani
- Preceded by: Samuel Parker
- Succeeded by: Samuel Parker

Minister of Interior
- In office December 5, 1876 – July 3, 1878
- Monarch: Kalākaua
- Preceded by: William Luther Moehonua
- Succeeded by: Samuel Gardner Wilder

Minister to the United States
- In office 1891 – January 17, 1893
- Monarch: Liliʻuokalani
- Preceded by: Henry A. P. Carter

Personal details
- Born: November 25, 1824 New York City, United States
- Died: August 10, 1895 (aged 70) Honolulu, Oahu, Kingdom of Hawaii
- Resting place: Oahu Cemetery
- Spouse: Ellen Dominis Paty
- Children: 7
- Occupation: Dentist, diplomat, politician

John Mott-Smith (November 25, 1824 – August 10, 1895) was the first dentist to set up a permanent practice in the Kingdom of Hawaii. He was also a politician, newspaper editor, and diplomat.

== Life ==
John Mott-Smith was born in New York City on November 13, 1824. His father was also named John Mott Smith (1795–1832), generally spelled without the hyphen, and mother was Amanda Day. His father had trained as a physician, but became a Methodist minister instead, and was Principal of Wesleyan Seminary in New York in 1820. In 1826 the family moved to White Plains, New York, with the school, and then in 1832 to Middletown, Connecticut, where his father became a professor of classical languages at the new Wesleyan University. His father died in 1832 and was one of the first burials in the university cemetery. Subsequently, having attended Wesleyan, the young Mott-Smith borrowed a book from a friend who was attending dental school and passed the exams to set up a practice in Albany, New York. He moved to California as part of the California Gold Rush in 1849 and practised dentistry there for two years. He sailed to Hawaii in early 1851.

He was only the third Western-trained dentist in the Hawaiian Islands and the first to set up a permanent practice. Two others, M. B. Stevens and George Colburn left after brief stays in the previous two years. For about 15 years he did most of the dental work in Honolulu. He shared an office building with physician William Hillebrand. In 1853 he had his first taste of politics when he was elected to the House of Representatives in the legislature of the Hawaiian Kingdom.

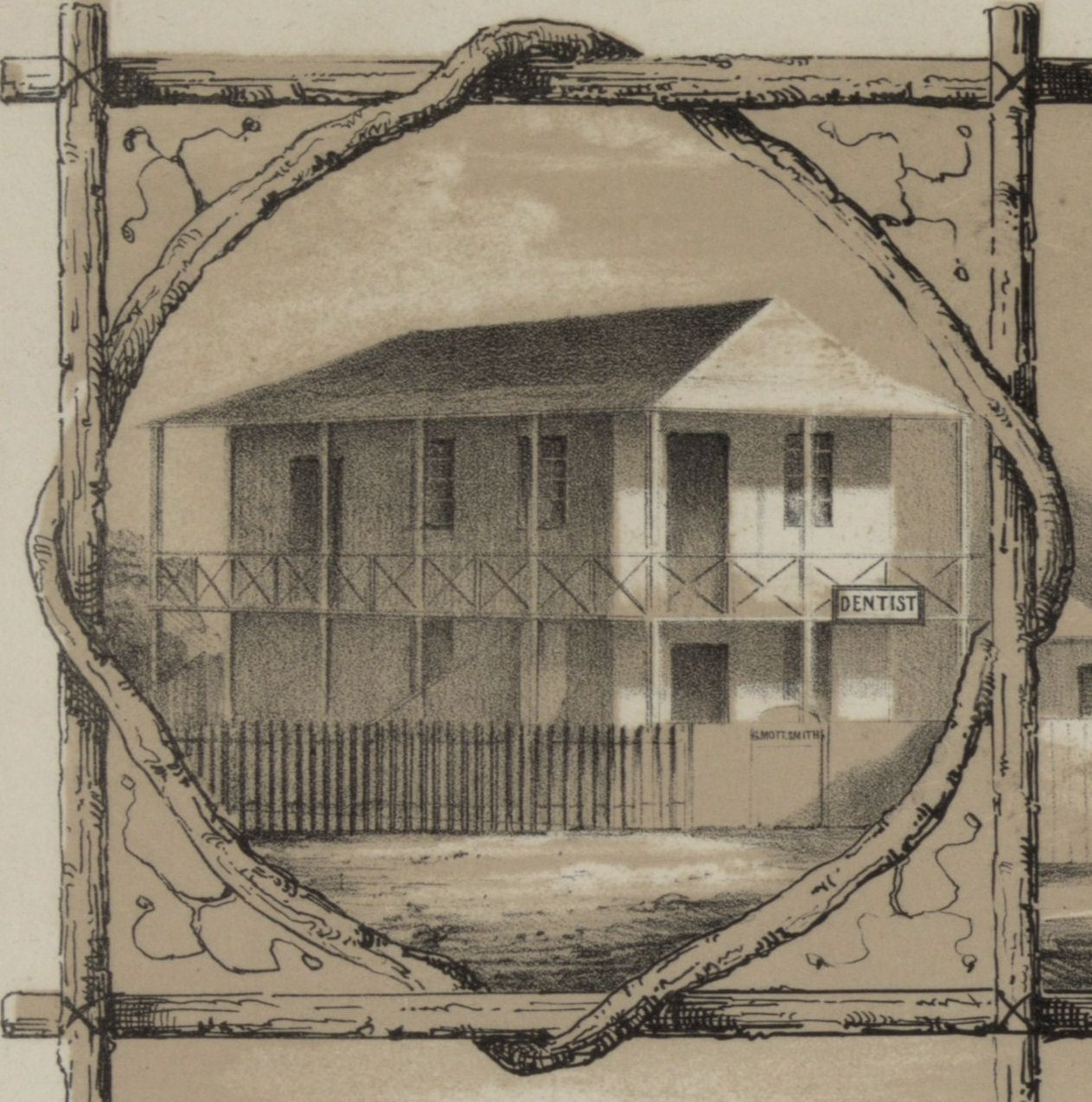
His dentist office in 1853

In 1866 Mott-Smith gave up his dental practice to John Morgan Whitney, the first in Hawaii to actually graduate from a dental school. He became editor of the newspaper Hawaiian Gazette. He used the paper to defend the monarchy, which gained him favor with King Kamehameha V, who made it the official government publication. He returned to the legislature in 1866, and was elected vice president of it in 1867. In 1868 he was sent to Washington, D.C., to help Elisha Hunt Allen negotiate a trade treaty, but was not successful. On December 21, 1869, he returned and was appointed to the powerful post of minister of finance in the cabinet. He served until August 25, 1872. With the king's influence, he was an investor with fellow American politician Charles Coffin Harris in the first Hawaiian Hotel. The government issued bonds to finance its construction. After Kamehameha V's death at the end of 1872, Mott-Smith was out of political power and resumed practising dentistry while he was on the Board of Education until 1874.

After the liberal King Lunalilo died and King Kalākaua was elected in 1874, monarchists were back in political favor. On December 4, 1876, Mott-Smith was appointed minister of interior, serving until July 3, 1878. From 1876 through 1886 he served in the upper House of Nobles in the kingdom legislature when he was not traveling. It was widely suspected that Kalākaua's replacement of his cabinet was influenced by Claus Spreckels, who refinanced the King's debts the night before, in order to secure water rights for his sugarcane plantation on Maui. Since the bachelor Lunalilo left no heirs, Mott-Smith was appointed to the first board of trustees of the Lunalilo Trust. In 1884 he was put in charge of the Hawaii exhibits at the World Cotton Centennial in New Orleans, Louisiana. He returned and was appointed Minister of Finance by Queen Liliʻuokalani on July 28, 1891. However, by October 17, 1891, he resigned and was sent back to Washington. Samuel Parker acted as finance minister both before and after him. His hope was to negotiate a replacement for the Reciprocity Treaty of 1875, but he was recalled after the 1893 Overthrow of the Kingdom of Hawaii. His position was just below the diplomatic rank of 21st-century ambassador. He retired to Honolulu where he died August 10, 1895, after an illness of several weeks. After a funeral at the Sain Andrew Cathedral he was buried in Oahu Cemetery.

== Family and legacy ==
In 1859 he married Ellen Dominis Paty. They had seven children. Son Ernest Augustus Mott-Smith was born May 12, 1873, went to Harvard Law School briefly, married Anna Elizabeth Paty in 1896 and became active in politics. He practised law, and served on various government boards of the Territory of Hawaii, such as the Board of Health from 1901 to 1925, and territorial secretary from 1907 to 1914. Other sons were Harold Meade Mott-Smith and Morton Churchill Mott-Smith. Daughters were Martha Paty Smith, Myra Harris Smith who married Reverend James B. Thomas, Ida Campbell Smith who married Robert Morss Lovett in Chicago, and May Henderson Smith. He left a substantial estate after investing in sugar plantations in Hawaii which his newspaper had earlier promoted.

A Mott-Smith building and Mott-Smith drive in Makiki at 21°18′33″N 157°50′13″W are named for him. The three-story brick building built in 1897 at the corner of Hotel and Fort Streets (the site of his former office, later known as The Hub) contained the second electric elevator in Hawaii.

== See also ==
- Hawaiian Kingdom–United States relations
- List of bilateral treaties signed by the Hawaiian Kingdom

Government offices
Preceded by Charles Coffin Harris	Kingdom of Hawaii Minister of Finance; 1869–1872	Succeeded by Robert Stirling
Preceded by William Luther Moehonua	Kingdom of Hawaii Minister of Interior; 1876–1878	Succeeded by Samuel G. Wilder
Preceded by Samuel Parker	Kingdom of Hawaii Minister of Finance; July 1891 – October 1891	Succeeded by Samuel Parker
Diplomatic posts
Preceded by Henry A. P. Carter	Kingdom of Hawaii Minister to U.S. 1891–1893	Succeeded by Kingdom overthrown
