= Paul Neumann (Attorney General) =

American politician

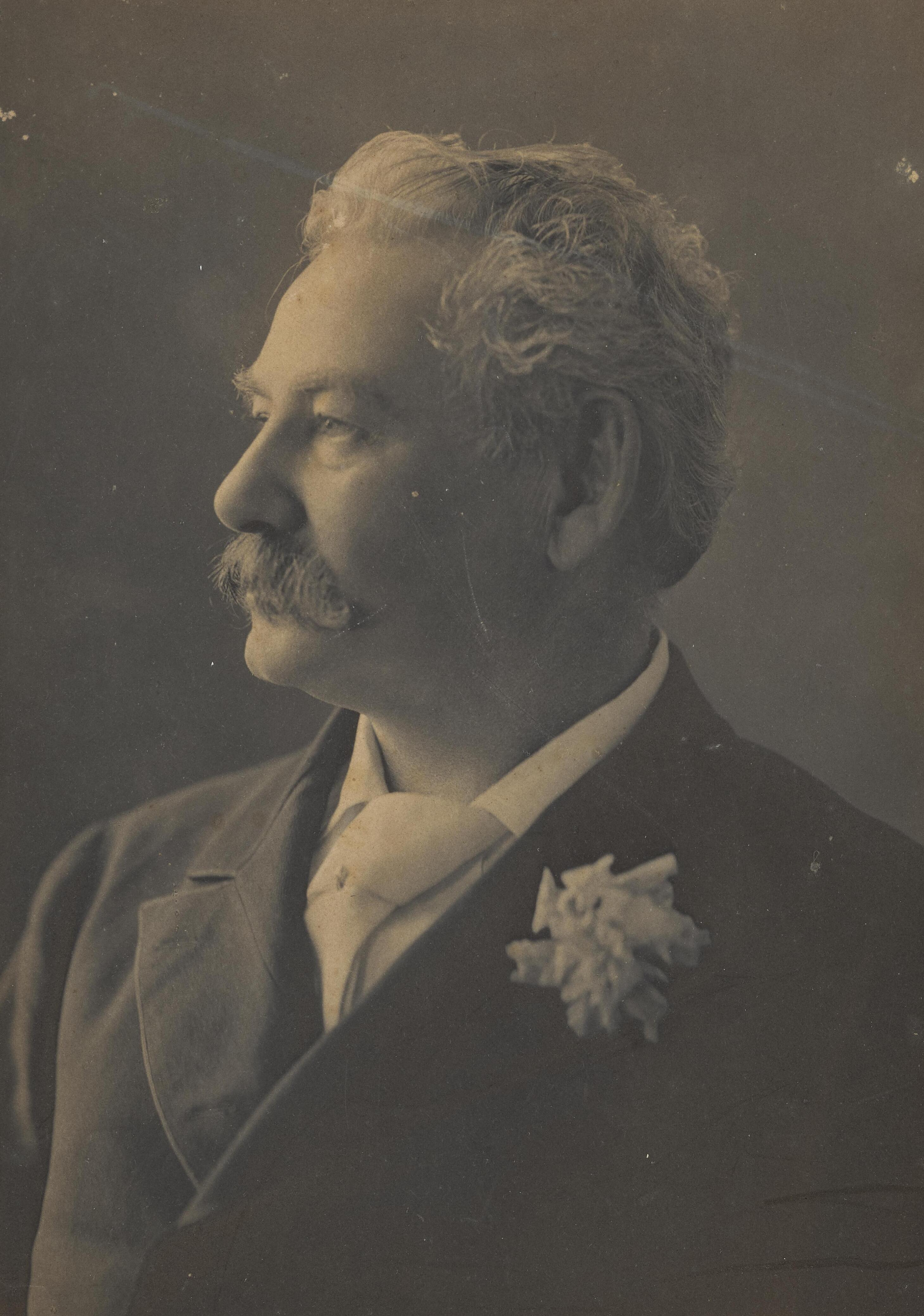
- Neumann c. 1897–1901

Attorney General of the Hawaiian Kingdom
- In office December 14, 1883 – June 30, 1886
- Monarch: Kalākaua
- In office August 29, 1892 – August 30, 1892
- Monarch: Liliuokalani
- In office September 12, 1892 – November 1, 1892
- Monarch: Liliuokalani

Member of the House of Nobles of the Hawaiian Kingdom
- In office 1884–1887
- In office 1892–1892

Personal details
- Born: 1839 Prussia
- Died: July 2, 1901 (aged 61–62) Honolulu, Hawaii Territory, United States
- Party: Republican
- Other political affiliations: National Reform (Hawaii)
- Spouse: Elisa
- Children: 5
- Occupation: Lawyer, politician, diplomat

Paul Neumann (1839 – July 2, 1901) was a lawyer, politician, and diplomat in California and the Kingdom of Hawaii.

== Background ==
Born and educated in Prussia, Neumann and his twin brother Edward relocated to California in 1854. The brothers worked in the goldmines, where Paul broke his leg.

Eventually, Edward relocated to New Orleans and Paul moved to San Francisco. He became a lawyer in California around 1864, and was elected to represent San Francisco for three terms in the California State Senate.

== Hawaii ==
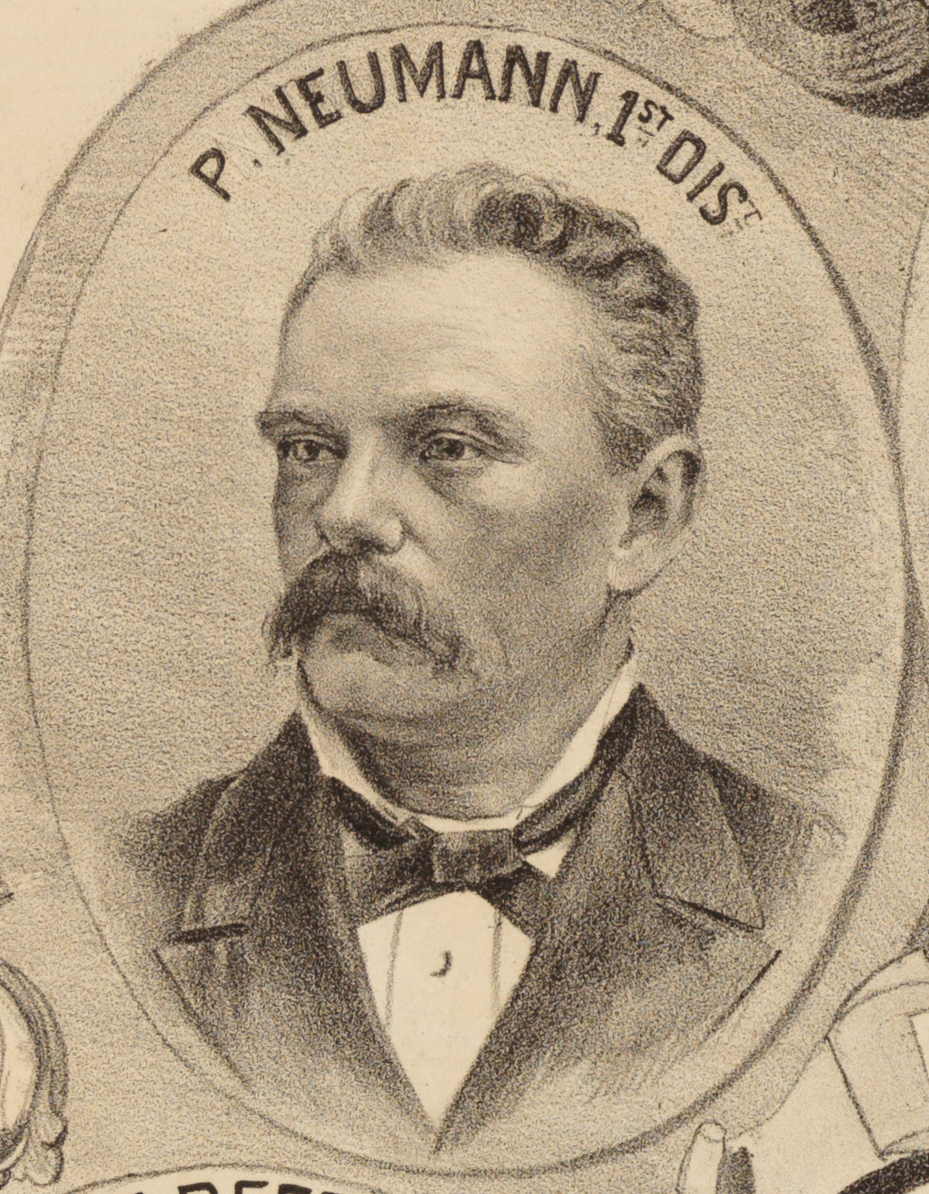
Engraving by Britton & Rey from a photograph by G. D. Morse, 1882

He worked for fellow-German American Claus Spreckels (1828–1908), who maintained a monopoly of the refining of sugar from Hawaii in California. Neumann met Hawaiian royalty when they would come to California to be entertained by Spreckels. Neumann was the Republican Party of California's candidate for the United States House of Representatives in November 1882 for the San Francisco district. However, he was attacked by the San Francisco Chronicle as being a "sugar coated candidate", claiming he was being used by Spreckels, and lost the election. In 1883, Neumann came to the Hawaiian Islands to serve as legal counsel for Spreckels who was now the publisher of the Honolulu Advertiser newspaper, first in the fall for a short visit. He was one of the first Jewish leaders in the Hawaiian Islands, although in later years he led a more secular life and did not raise his children in the Jewish faith.

Being from Europe, Neumann was comfortable around a monarchy, and made friends with the other Europeans in the islands. King David Kalākaua and other members of the government depended on loans from Spreckels to support their lifestyles. Within days of returning, Neumann was admitted to the bar and appointed as attorney general of the Kingdom of Hawaii, and a member of Kalākaua's Privy Council on December 14, 1883. Walter M. Gibson had been acting as attorney general, even though he had no legal training. The cabinet stayed intact until June 30, 1886, when another combination (except Gibson) was brought in, probably at the suggestion of Spreckels. Neumann was sometimes attacked by the conservative press for his "bohemianism", including playing poker with the king, which the missionaries thought was sinful. He had been president of the Bohemian Club in San Francisco. Charles T. Gulick, although related to missionaries, also became a member of the Kalākaua cabinet as Minister of the Interior.

In 1884 Neumann was appointed to the House of Nobles in the kingdom legislature, and the board of health. He served as envoy to Mexico in 1884, and investigated forming a consular office in San Francisco in 1885. Under the new 1887 Constitution of the Kingdom of Hawaii, the House of Nobles became an elected office, so he lost his seat, until winning the election of 1892 for one more session.

Queen Liliʻuokalani appointed him attorney general again on August 29, but he resigned the next day after a motion of no confidence in the legislature, when his scheme for a state lottery was heavily opposed in the legislature. On September 12 he was appointed again and served to November 1, 1892.

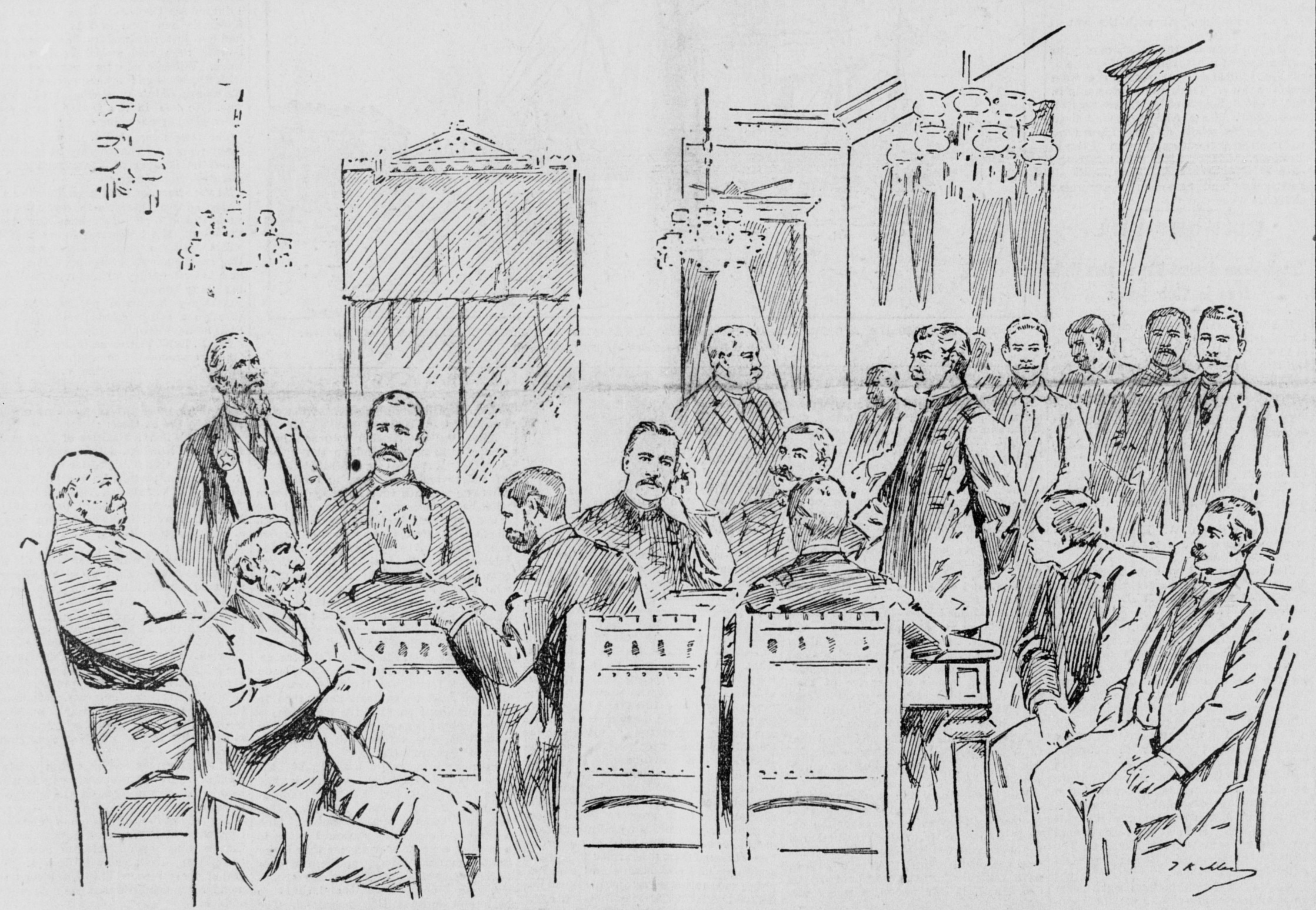
The 1895 trial in former ʻIolani Palace throne room

Neumann became the private attorney of the queen after the overthrow of the Kingdom of Hawaii in 1893. He was sent to Washington, DC to protest the overthrow and plead for the restoration of the monarchy. After an editorial in the Advertiser offended him, Neumann (who had a wooden leg) attacked new editor Henry Northrop Castle (son of Samuel Northrup Castle) with his cane in December 1893. He defended Liliʻuokalani and other prisoners in a military tribunal following the failed 1895 rebellion against the Republic of Hawaii, where she was convicted of misprision of treason. He advised Liliʻuokalani to issue a formal abdication, which she did, and the revolutionaries were pardoned. When a circuit judge position opened up, he was passed over for the much younger William Stanley.

After the islands were annexed to the United States in 1898, he became more resigned to the situation, and applied to be the first attorney from Hawaii to practice before the Supreme Court of the United States. He did think the Crown Lands of Hawaii had been seized illegally, a case that is still controversial.

Although he had no government position, he was accepted in society enough to become toastmaster of the local Masonic Lodge, and president of the Hawaii Bar Association. He represented many of the Chinese victims of the Great Honolulu Chinatown Fire of 1900. He died July 2, 1901. At his funeral he was called "one of the most brilliant men who ever set foot on Hawaiian soil". He was buried in Oahu Cemetery.

== Personal life and death ==
His daughter Eva (1871–1921) married Alfred Fowler (1860–1933) and became a friend of Ezra Pound. Son Edouard Neumann graduated from the United States Naval Academy (nominated by California congressman Julius Kahn), but was killed in a fire during target practice on the USS Missouri on April 13, 1904. Son Paul Neumann Jr. studied medicine at the University of Edinburgh and lived in London. Neumann's wife Elisa also moved to London, as did daughter Lily Neumann who married Robert MacDonald Bird. Other daughters Anita A. Neumann married Herman T. Focke in Honolulu in 1895, and Inez Sophie Neumann married William F. C. Hasson in 1891 who moved to Annapolis, Maryland. His wife Elisa went to Acapulco, Mexico in 1908 to settle the estate of her mother and stepfather who had both died. On a steamer to San Francisco she died after jumping overboard.

== Bibliography ==
- Mohan, Hugh J.; Cosgrave, John P.; Clough, E. H. (1880). Pen Pictures of Our Representative Men. H. A. Weaver's Valley Press Print. House – via HathiTrust.

Government offices
Preceded by Walter M. Gibson	Kingdom of Hawaii Attorney General; December 1883 – June 1886	Succeeded by Walter M. Gibson
Preceded by Hermann A. Widemann	Kingdom of Hawaii Attorney General; August 29, 1892 – August 30, 1892; September 12, 1892 – November 1, 1892	Succeeded by Charles F. Creighton
