= John Adams Cummins =

Hawaiian noble

The Honourable John Adams Kuakini Cummins
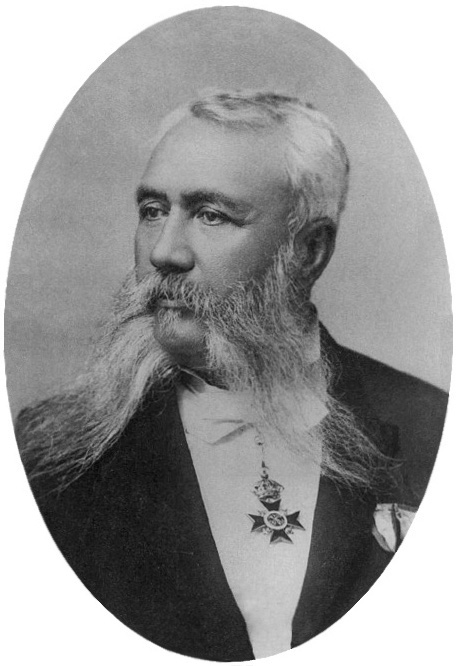

Minister of Foreign Affairs
- In office June 17, 1890 – February 25, 1891
- Monarch: Kalākaua
- Preceded by: Jonathan Austin
- Succeeded by: Samuel Parker

Personal details
- Born: March 17, 1835 Honolulu, Oahu, Kingdom of Hawaii
- Died: March 21, 1913 (aged 78)
- Resting place: Oahu Cemetery
- Party: National Reform
- Spouse(s): Rebecca Kahalewai; Elizabeth Kapeka Merseberg others?
- Children: 5
- Occupation: Planter, Politician

John Adams Kuakini Cummins (March 17, 1835 – March 21, 1913) was a member of the nobility of the Kingdom of Hawaii who became a wealthy businessman, and was involved in politics as the kingdom was overthrown.

== Life ==
John Adams Kuakini Cummins was born March 17, 1835, in Honolulu. He was a namesake of island governor John Adams Kuakini (1789–1844), who in turn took the name of John Quincy Adams when Americans first settled on the islands in the 1820s. His father was Thomas Cummins (1802–1885) who was born in Lincoln, England, raised in Massachusetts, and came to the Hawaiian Islands in 1828. His mother was High Chiefess Kaumakaokane Papaliʻaiʻaina (1810–1849), who was a distant relative of the royal family of Hawaii. As the custom of native Hawaiians, he was raised as an aliʻi nui because of his mother's family background. His father owned much of land in Waimānalo on the east coast of the island of Oʻahu, starting a horse and cattle ranch in the 1840s. He managed the ranch and converted it to a sugarcane plantation starting in 1877, and built a mill in 1881.

He married Rebecca Kahalewai (1834–1902) in 1861, also considered a high chiefess, and had five children with her, four daughters and one son. Their son Thomas Puaaliʻi Cummins (1869–1928) was sent to Saint Matthews School in California in 1885 along with three Hawaiian princes. Daughters were Matilda Kaumakaokane Cummins Walker (1862–1937), Jane Piʻikea Cummins Merseberg (1864–1918), May Kaaolani Cummins Clark (1874–1935) and one who died young. He might have had another child with one or two "secondary wives". After his first wife's death, in 1902 he married Elizabeth Kapeka Merseberg (1877–1925), who was a sister of a son-in-law, and adopted a son.

Cummins owned several houses in town, but enjoyed entertaining on his Waimānalo estate in a house known as Mauna Loke (Rose Mont). His guests included royalty starting with Kamehameha V as well as foreign visitors. This included German Princes and the Duke of Edinburgh in 1869. He traded racehorses with Leland Stanford and Pierre Lorillard IV, and operated a railroad and a steamship to the estate. Chants passed down describe the elaborate birthday celebration held in 1883 for Queen Kapiʻolani. This reputation earned him the name "Prince of Entertainers".

== Politics ==
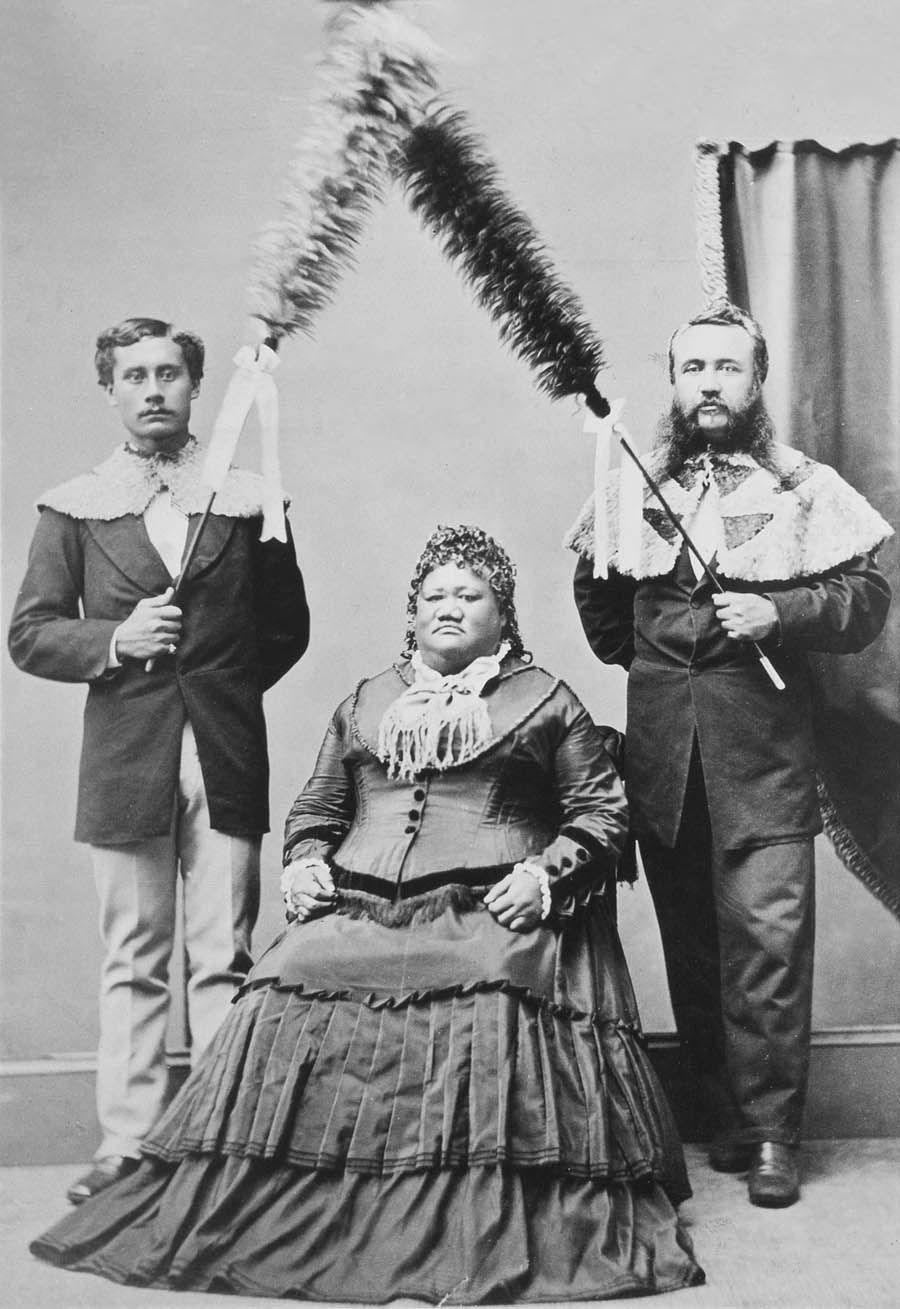
Right, with Sam Parker and Princess Keʻelikolani

Cummins was elected to the House of Representatives in the legislature of the Hawaiian Kingdom in 1874. The kingdom faced a series of political crises, including a need for an election for monarch after Kamehameha V and Lunalilo both died without naming heirs. King Kalākaua appointed him to the Privy Council on June 18, 1874, shortly after he came to the throne. Even though Cummins voted against former Queen Emma in the election, she asked him to manage a trek around the islands in November 1875. He had staged a similar grand tour the year before for Kalākaua. She was not disappointed. Although many ancient Hawaiian customs had faded (due to influence of conservative Christian missionaries, for example), Cummins staged great revivals of ceremonies such as traditional hula performance. In the legislature he advocated for the Reciprocity Treaty of 1875 with the United States, which helped increase profits in the sugar industry, and his fortunes grew.

He left the sugar business to William G. Irwin, agent of Claus Spreckels, and developed a commercial building called the Cummins Block at Fort and Merchant streets in Downtown Honolulu. In 1889 he represented Hawaii at the Paris exposition known as Exposition Universelle. On June 17, 1890, he became Minister of Foreign Affairs in Kalākaua's cabinet, and thus was in the House of Nobles of the legislature for the 1890 session. When Kalākaua died and Queen Liliʻuokalani came to the throne in early 1891, she replaced all her ministers. Cummins resigned February 25, 1891. He was replaced by Samuel Parker who was another part-Hawaiian. He was elected to the 1892 session of the House of Nobles, on the Hawaiian National Reform Party ticket. He also organized a group called the Native Sons of Hawaii which supported the monarchy.

After the overthrow of the Kingdom of Hawaii in early 1893, Liliʻuokalani asked Cummins to visit the US to lobby for its help in restoration of the monarchy. The commission including Parker and Hermann A. Widemann ended in failure. He served as Honorary President of Hui Aloha ʻĀina (Hawaiian Patriotic League), a patriotic organization founded to protest the overthrow and the attempt of Hawaiian annexation to the United States, and represented the case of the monarchy and the Hawaiian people to the United States Commissioner James Henderson Blount who was sent by President Grover Cleveland to investigate the overthrow. However, on the voyage to the west coast, William T. Seward, a former Major in the American Civil War who worked for Cummins and lived in one of his homes, smuggled guns and ammunition for the failed 1895 counter-revolution. Thomas Beresford Walker, who was married to Cummins' eldest daughter Matilda, was also implicated in the plot. Cummins was arrested, charged with treason and convicted. He was sentenced to prison, but released after paying a fine and agreeing to testify against the ones actively involved in the arms trading.

== Death and legacy ==
He died on March 21, 1913, from influenza after a series of strokes and was buried in Oahu Cemetery. Even his political opponents called him "the playmate of princes and the companion and entertainer of kings". The territorial legislature had tried several times to refund his fine, but it was never approved by the governor. His funeral was a strange mix of mostly traditional symbols of the Hawaiian religion, with a Christian service in the Hawaiian language, attended by both royalists and planners of the overthrow. A street was named for him in Honolulu at 21°17′47″N 157°51′9″W.

A great-grandson (through his daughter Jane Piikea Merseberg) was mayor Neal Blaisdell. His youngest daughter May Cummins married distant cousin Joseph Clark and became stepmother to actress Mamo Clark. After the last child died in 1937, a US federal court case awarded Mamo Clark a share in the still considerable estate.

Government offices
Preceded by Jonathan Austin	Kingdom of Hawaii Minister of Foreign Affairs; June 1890 – February 1891	Succeeded by Samuel Parker
