= Ministry of Finance (Hawaii) =

Foreign Minister of the Kingdom (Republic) of Hawaii Kuhina Waiwai
- Flag of Hawaii
- Appointer: Monarchs of Hawaii; President of Hawaii
- Inaugural holder: Gerrit P. Judd
- Formation: 1842

The Minister of Finance (Hawaiian: Kuhina Waiwai) was a powerful office in the Kingdom of Hawaii, the Provisional Government of Hawaii and the Republic of Hawaii from 1842 to 1900. It made up one of the four offices of the monarchical or presidential cabinet which advised the Head of State of Hawaii on executive affairs. During the monarchy, ministers were also ex-officio members of the Privy Council and the House of Nobles in the legislature. During the republic, ministers were ex-officio members of both houses of the legislature. The head of state had the power to appoint the ministers but later Hawaiian constitutions limited the power the head of state had in removing the cabinet ministers by requiring a vote of no confidence from a majority of the elective members of the legislature. All acts of the head of state had to be countersigned by a minister.

== Ministers of Finance ==
#	Name	Picture	Birth	Death	Assumed office	Left office	Notes	Head of state
1	Gerrit Parmele Judd		April 23, 1803	July 12, 1873	May 10, 1842	September 6, 1849		Kamehameha III
	Edwin Oscar Hall		October 21, 1810	September 19, 1883	September 6, 1849	September 26, 1850		Kamehameha III
2	Gerrit Parmele Judd		April 23, 1803	July 12, 1873	September 26, 1850	September 6, 1853	2nd term	Kamehameha III
3	Elisha Hunt Allen		January 28, 1804	January 1, 1883	September 6, 1853	June 11, 1857		Kamehameha III, Kamehameha IV
4	Robert Crichton Wyllie		October 13, 1798	October 19, 1865	June 11, 1857	May 26, 1858	1st term	Kamehameha IV
5	David Lawrence Gregg		May 9, c. 1814	December 23, 1868	May 26, 1858	August 18, 1862		Kamehameha IV
6	Robert Crichton Wyllie		October 13, 1798	October 19, 1865	August 18, 1862	November 5, 1863	2nd term	Kamehameha IV
7	Charles Gordon Hopkins		1822	1886	November 5, 1863	December 24, 1863		Kamehameha IV; Kamehameha V
8	Charles de Varigny		November 25, 1829	November 9, 1899	December 24, 1863	December 21, 1865		Kamehameha V
9	Charles Coffin Harris		June 9, 1822	July 2, 1881	December 21, 1865	December 21, 1869		Kamehameha V
10	John Mott-Smith		November 25, 1824	August 10, 1895	December 21, 1869	August 25, 1872	1st term	Kamehameha V
11	Robert Stirling		-	January 6, 1889	August 25, 1872	February 17, 1874		Kamehameha V, Lunalilo
12	Paul Nahaolelua		cirac 1808	September 15, 1875	February 17, 1874	October 31, 1874		Kalākaua
13	John Smith Walker		July 10, 1820	May 29, 1893	October 31, 1874	December 5, 1876	1st term	Kalākaua
14	John Mākini Kapena		1843	October 23, 1887	December 5, 1876	July 3, 1878	1st term	Kalākaua
15	Simon Kaloa Kaai		-	March 22, 1884	July 3, 1878	August 14, 1880	1st term	Kalākaua
16	Moses Kuaea		1824	May 5, 1884	August 14, 1880	September 27, 1880		Kalākaua
17	John Smith Walker		July 10, 1820	May 29, 1893	September 27, 1880	May 20, 1882	2nd term	Kalākaua
18	John Edward Bush		February 15, 1842	June 28, 1906	May 20, 1882	August 8, 1882		Kalākaua
19	Simon Kaloa Kaai		-	March 22, 1884	August 8, 1882	February 13, 1883	2nd term	Kalākaua
20	John Mākini Kapena		1843	October 23, 1887	February 13, 1883	June 30, 1886	2nd term, part of it Gulick served as acting finance minister	Kalākaua
	Charles Thomas Gulick		June, 1841	November 7, 1897	September 1, 1885	---	acting	Kalākaua
21	Paul Puhiula Kanoa		June 10, 1832	March 18, 1895	June 30, 1886	July 1, 1887		Kalākaua
22	William Lowthian Green		-	December 7, 1890	July 1, 1887	July 22, 1889	1st term	Kalākaua
23	Samuel Mills Damon		March 13, 1845	July 1, 1924	July 22, 1889	June 17, 1890	1st term	Kalākaua
24	Godfrey Brown		-	January 9, 1928	July 17, 1890	February 25, 1891	2nd term	Kalākaua, Liliuokalani
25	Hermann Adam Widemann		December 24, 1822	February 7, 1899	February 25, 1891	March 10, 1891	1st term	Liliuokalani
	Samuel Parker		June 23, 1853	July 4, 1920	March 10, 1891	June 28, 1891	acting	Liliuokalani
26	John Mott-Smith		November 25, 1824	August 10, 1895	July 28, 1891	October 17, 1891	2nd term	Liliuokalani
	Samuel Parker		June 23, 1853	July 4, 1920	October 17, 1891	January 28, 1892	acting	Liliuokalani
27	Hermann Adam Widemann		December 24, 1822	February 7, 1899	July 28, 1892	September 12, 1892	2nd term	Liliuokalani
28	Edward Creamor Macfarlane		October 8, 1848	February 16, 1902	September 12, 1892	November 1, 1892		Liliuokalani
29	William H. Cornwell		May 30, 1843	November 18, 1903	November 1, 1892	November 1, 1892	1st term	Liliuokalani
30	Peter Cushman Jones		October 12, 1837	April 23, 1922	November 8, 1892	January 12, 1893	1st term	Liliuokalani
31	William H. Cornwell		May 30, 1843	November 18, 1903	January 13, 1893	January 17, 1893	2nd term	Liliuokalani
32	Peter Cushman Jones		October 12, 1837	April 23, 1922	January 17, 1893	March 15, 1893	2nd term	President Dole
33	Theodore C. Porter		1848	February 28, 1898	March 15, 1893	May 29, 1893		President Dole
34	Samuel Mills Damon		March 13, 1845	July 1, 1924	May 29, 1893	June 3, 1896	2nd term	President Dole
	James Anderson King		December 4, 1832	October 16, 1899	June 3, 1896	July 1, 1896	acting	President Dole
35	Samuel Mills Damon		March 13, 1845	July 1, 1924	July 1, 1896	May 5, 1897	3rd term	President Dole
	Henry Ernest Cooper		August 28, 1857	May 15, 1929	May 5, 1897	September 12, 1897	acting	President Dole
35	Theodore F. Lansing		1852?	-	September 12, 1897	August 11, 1897		President Dole
36	Samuel Mills Damon		March 13, 1845	July 1, 1924	August 11, 1897	June 14, 1900	4th term	President Dole

== See also ==
- Cabinet of the Kingdom of Hawaii

Other members of the Hawaiian Cabinet

- Ministry of the Interior (Hawaii)
- Ministry of Foreign Affairs (Hawaii)
- Attorney General of Hawaii
