= Charles T. Gulick =

Kingdom of Hawaiʻi politician

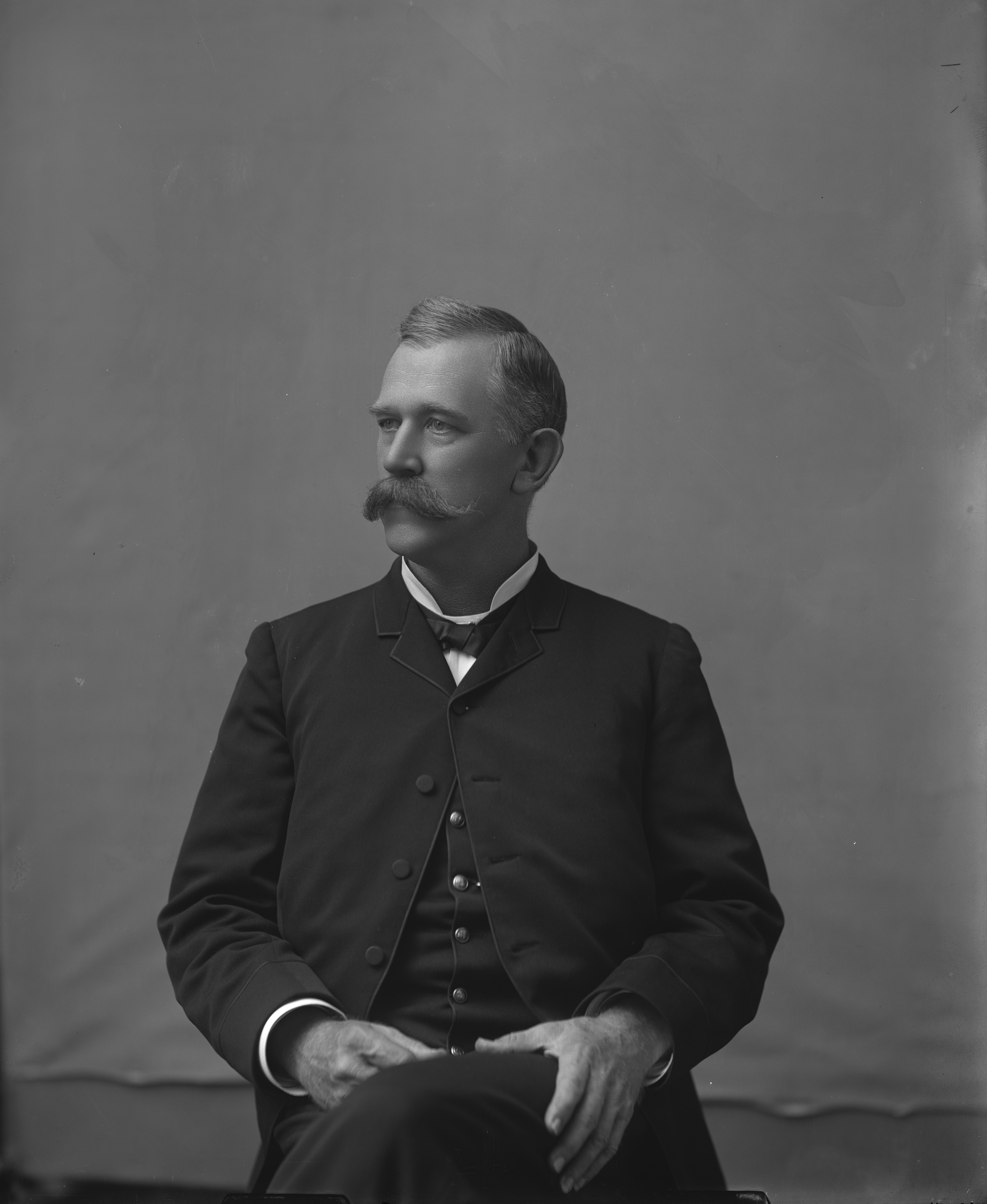

Minister of the Interior of Hawaiʻi
- In office August 6, 1883 – June 30, 1886
- In office September 12 – November 8, 1892

Personal details
- Born: Charles Thomas Gulick; July 25, 1841 Forked River, New Jersey, U.S.
- Died: November 7, 1897 (aged 56) Honolulu, Republic of Hawaiʻi
- Spouse: Sarepta A. Thompson
- Education: Punahou School

Military service
- Allegiance: Kingdom of Hawaiʻi
- Branch: Honolulu Rifles
- Service years: 1868–1883
- Rank: Adjutant general

Charles Thomas Gulick (July 25, 1841 – November 7, 1897) was a Kingdom of Hawaiʻi politician and one of the few members of the various missionary families of the time to side with the monarchy in the 1893 overthrow of the Kingdom of Hawaiʻi.

== Life ==
Gulick was born on July 25, 1841, to a family of American missionaries. His father was William Gulick, and mother was Eliza Throop Thomas (1804–1903). His father's brother Peter Johnson Gulick married his mother's sister Frances "Fanny" Hinckley Thomas Gulick (1798–1883), who had seven children (his cousins) who also became missionaries, including Luther Halsey Gulick (1828–1891) and John Thomas Gulick (1832–1923).

He attended Punahou School 1855–1862, where he was a pitcher on a team called the "Pacifics" playing early games of baseball with the sons of Alexander Cartwright. In September 1869 he officially became a citizen of the Kingdom of Hawaiʻi.

He ran a business as notary public and issued government documents such as marriage licenses. He became the commander of the original Honolulu Rifles, with rank of Captain; this unit unlike its namesake remained loyal to the monarchy until disbanded in 1874. He also later served as adjutant general from 1878. On February 5, 1876, he married Sarepta A. Thompson in Honolulu.

He was appointed to the cabinet of King Kalākaua as Minister of the Interior on August 6, 1883, and served until June 30, 1886. He also served as acting Minister of Finance during the absence of John Mākini Kapena. It is widely thought that sugar magnate Claus Spreckels had suggested both changes. Both before and after Gulick, Walter M. Gibson acted as Minister of the Interior, while also acting as Minister of Foreign Affairs and even Attorney general. He went back into business, and became a real estate broker.

Gulick was appointed again to the post of Minister of the Interior of Queen Liliʻuokalani on September 12, 1892, and served until November 1, 1892.

He met with Liliʻuokalani and other leaders loyal to her on January 15, 1893, just before the overthrow of the Kingdom of Hawaiʻi. In the 1895 Wilcox rebellion, he was tentatively selected to be Minister of Finance in the cabinet, and drafted the new constitution to be used if the plot had succeeded. He and the other leaders were arrested, and put on trial for treason starting January 21, 1895. The defence was led by former attorney general Paul Neumann. Although Gulick denied involvement in plans for military strikes, witnesses testified the group met at his house. He was convicted and first sentenced to death, which on February 23, was reduced to 35 years in prison and a fine.

Gulick was part of the last batch of prisoners to be released when the remaining eight prisoners including him and Wilcox were pardoned and released on January 1, 1896. He died November 7, 1897. A street in Honolulu was named Gulick Avenue in his honor.

Government offices
Preceded by Walter Murray Gibson	Minister of the Interior of Hawaiʻi; 6 August 1883 – 30 June 1886	Succeeded by Walter Murray Gibson
Preceded by John Mākini Kapena	Minister of Finance of Hawaiʻi; September 1885 (acting)	Succeeded by John Mākini Kapena
Preceded by Charles Nichols Spencer	Minister of the Interior of Hawaiʻi; 12 September – 8 November 1892	Succeeded by George Norton Wilcox
