= Walter M. Gibson =

Prime Minister of Hawaii (1882–1887)

His Excellency Walter M. Gibson
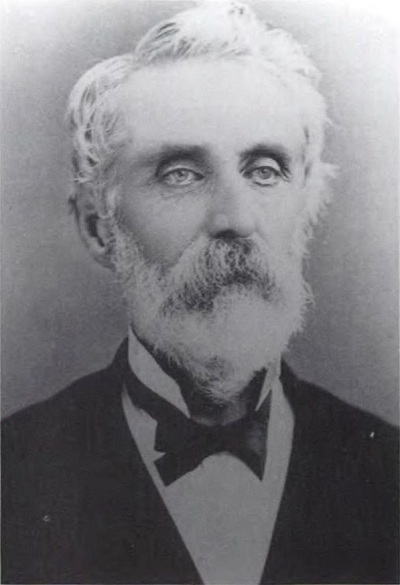
- Photo of Walter M. Gibson

Prime Minister of Hawaii
- In office May 20, 1882 – June 30, 1887
- Monarch: Kalākaua
- Preceded by: William Lowthian Green
- Succeeded by: Position Vacant

Minister of Foreign Affairs
- In office May 20, 1882 – June 30, 1886
- Monarch: Kalākaua
- Preceded by: William L. Green
- Succeeded by: Robert J. Creighton

Minister of the Interior
- In office June 30, 1886 – October 13, 1886
- Monarch: Kalākaua
- Preceded by: Charles T. Gulick
- Succeeded by: Luther Aholo

Minister of Foreign Affairs
- In office October 13, 1886 – July 1, 1887
- Monarch: Kalākaua
- Preceded by: Robert J. Creighton
- Succeeded by: Godfrey Brown

Personal details
- Born: Walter Murray Gibson; January 16, 1822 At sea, Atlantic Ocean
- Died: January 21, 1888 (aged 66) San Francisco, California
- Resting place: Hawaii
- Party: National
- Spouse: Rachel Lewis Gibson (m. 1838)
- Children: 3

Walter Murray Gibson (January 16, 1822 – January 21, 1888) was an American adventurer and a government minister in the Kingdom of Hawaii prior to the kingdom's 1887 constitution.

== Early life ==
Gibson was born January 16, 1822, at sea between Gibraltar and England. He was christened on March 6 in England in Stamfordham, Northumberland, though he sometimes claimed to have been born in England. As a young man, he taught a school in Elbert County, Georgia, though the land later became a part of Hart County, Georgia. He spent his young adulthood in Anderson District, South Carolina. He was the captain of a ship and became involved in gunrunning in the Caribbean. Later, he was jailed in the East Indies by the Dutch on charges of fomenting rebellion, was sentenced to death, but managed to escape from Weltevreden Prison in Java. He claimed receiving a vision while in prison to "build up a kingdom in these isles, whose lines of power shall run around the earth." In 1859, he went to Utah Territory and joined the Church of Jesus Christ of Latter-day Saints (LDS Church), persuading church president Brigham Young to allow him to establish a Mormon colony in the Pacific.

== LDS Church colony ==
Gibson arrived in the Hawaiian Islands in 1861, and founded a colony among members of the LDS Church who were already in the islands. He purchased land on the island of Lanai with funds from the colony in his own name, but was excommunicated after an investigation by the church regarding accusations of preaching false doctrine, maladministration of the colony, and embezzlement of church funds. The proceedings leading to his excommunication were initiated by letters from Jonathan Napela and other Native Hawaiian church leaders to church headquarters in Salt Lake City. Upon excommunication, he expelled those who did not support him from his colony and church and began angling for secular political office and power.

== Political career ==
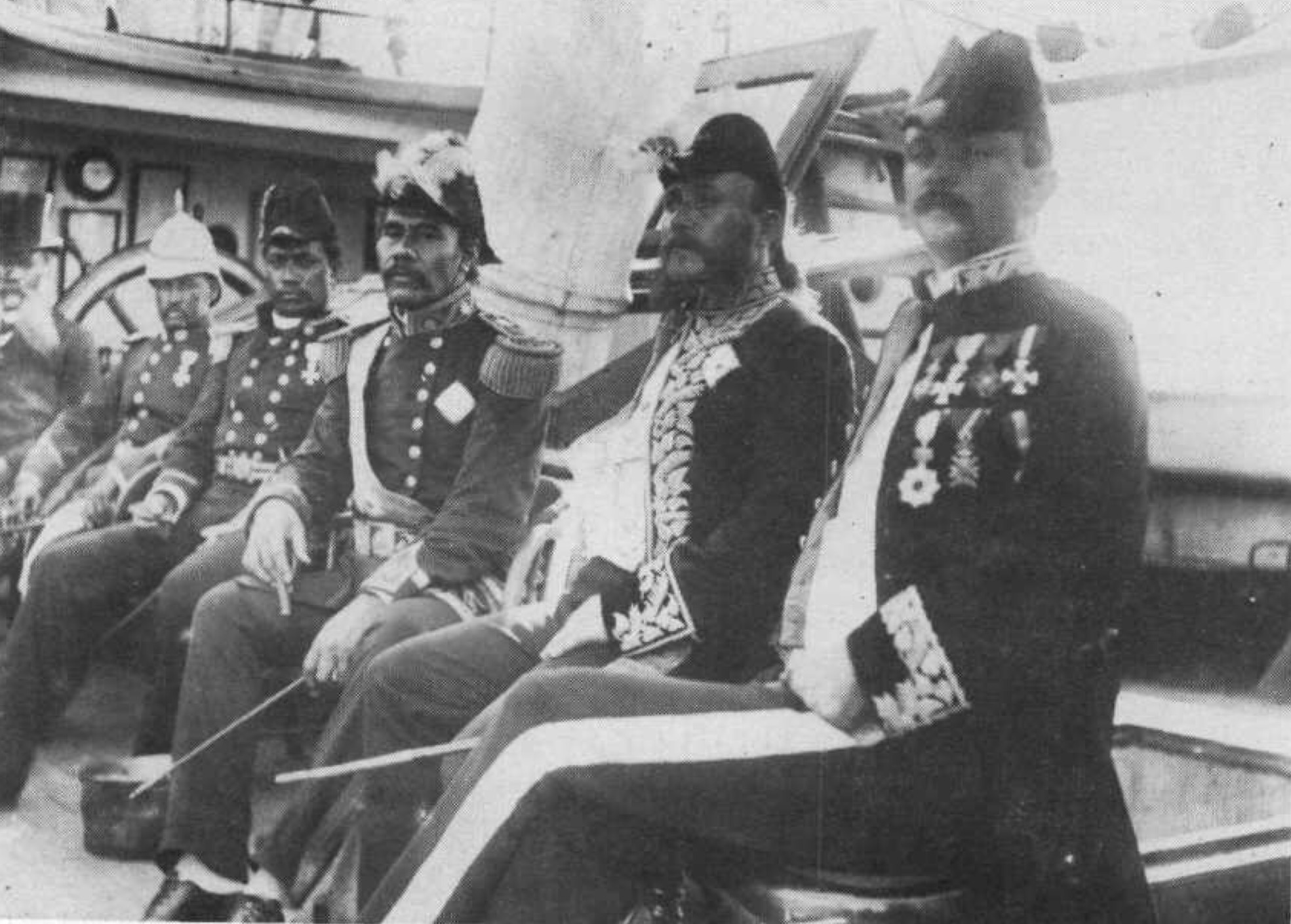
Hawaiian envoys and Samoan authorities on board the Kaimiloa in 1887

In 1873, Gibson started his own newspaper to extol his virtues in English and Hawaiian called the Nuhou. His acquiring of the Malay language during his time in Java led to a notable Hawaiian translation of the Hikayat Hang Tuah epic, Ke Kaao o Lakamana ('The Story of Laksamana') published in this newspaper from November 1873 to April 1874. He successfully ran for the House of Representatives in 1878 as a candidate of the King's Party, allying himself with King Kalakaua and portraying himself as the "voice of Hawaiians". In 1880 he bought the Pacific Commercial Advertiser (forerunner to the Honolulu Advertiser).

In 1882, he was appointed Minister of Foreign Affairs, and then in May 1882, Prime Minister of the Kingdom of Hawaii by King Kalākaua. He also served on various boards, as Attorney General, Minister of the Interior, and Secretary of War. He often held several cabinet positions simultaneously, and at one point, the cabinet consisted of only him and Minister of Finance John Mākini Kapena, resulting in newspapers labeling him the "Minister of Everything".

Gibson was widely credited with encouraging Kalākaua to make rash political moves, which eventually led to the imposition of the 1887 Constitution of the Kingdom of Hawaii. One of his bolder plans included an attempt to build a Pacific empire, which drew the ire of both the international and local Hawaiian communities. Sending the "homemade battleship" Kaimiloa to Samoa in 1887 resulted in suspicions from the German Navy and embarrassment for the conduct of the crew.

== Personal life ==
On July 10, 1838, the sixteen-year old Gibson married the twenty-year old Rachel Margaret Lewis (1818–1844), daughter of Jesse and Hannah Lewis. Prior to their marriage, Gibson had been a boarder with the Lewises in their home in Sandy Springs, outside of Pendleton, South Carolina. They had three children: John Lewis (1838–1877), Henry (died 1893) and Tallulah (later changed to the Hawaiianized Talula, 1843–1903), who married the Sheriff of Maui, Frederick H. Hayselden and became Talula Hayselden. Rachel died in 1844, possibly from the cold conditions of the family's cabin floors or complications from her last pregnancy.

== Death ==
Though the 1887 Bayonet Constitution dislodged Gibson from all cabinet positions, undying loyalty to Hawaiian sovereignty kept him in the crosshairs of pro-annexationists, a majority of which were either American or New England missionary descendants. Animosity peaked and Gibson was abducted to a Honolulu wharf where he escaped lynching by conceding to forced exile and promptly retreated to San Francisco in July 1887. Convalescing there between the Occidental Hotel and St. Mary's Hospital the penultimate Prime Minister of the Hawaiian Kingdom succumbed to pneumonia and a private battle with tuberculosis January 21, 1888.

His body was returned to Hawaii for a funeral and burial.

Gibson's modest estate, including the ranch on Lana'i and a noble residence across from 'Iolani Palace, was bestowed to his daughter Talula and (her husband) Fred Hayselden. Probate failed to uncover evidence of any public or private financial misdealing and the man's respectable cash reserve adequately satisfied outstanding debts.

== Legacy ==
Gibson's most prominent contribution to the world, ‘Iolani Palace in Honolulu, remains revered by native Hawaiian and visited by millions of guests annually. Adjacent to it stands the iconic Kamehameha statue, another vestige of the Gibson administration. Past and current critics insist both are symbols of reckless and irresponsible government yet their enduring cultural value is indisputable.

Had Queen Lili’uokalani successfully promulgated her 1893 constitution history would likely recall Walter Murray Gibson much as she did;

“Whatever the faults of Mr. Gibson, so long Prime Minister of Kalakaua, he was an able man, and his only public crime was his loyalty to his king. And it was for this reason that he (was) seized by a mob composed of the ‘Missionary Party’ armed with rifles and marched down the public streets to the wharves; not an atom of respect being shown to the gray hairs of the old man who had occupied for years the highest position in the King's cabinet...against whom no charge, political or criminal, was ever made.”

Strategically aided by American diplomatic and military interplay, annexationists ruled the day, however, and semblance of Gibson throughout Hawai’i, as well as the kingdom he so loved itself, suffered a meticulously planned and well executed demise by adversaries.

Still a pariah in most Latter-Day Saint circles, opinions typically reflect those expressed by Mormon historian Samuel W. Taylor, who refers to Gibson as an imposter and manipulator of the church and Brigham Young.

Speaking less sternly before a congregation in the tabernacle at Salt Lake City, Utah, the Mormon prophet, himself, clarified;

“The charge against Walter M. Gibson was not for owning property or for claiming it, for no one cared how much he had, if he only used it for the benefit of the poor who had given it, but the charge was his persistent refusal to be dictated by the Priesthood."

Saved from execution by a British diplomat.

== In film ==
Sam Neill played Gibson in the 1999 film Molokai: The Story of Father Damien.

== Bibliography ==
- Adler, Jacob; Kamins, Robert M. (2019) [1986]. The Fantastic Life of Walter Murray Gibson: Hawaii's Minister of Everything. Honolulu: University of Hawaii Press. ISBN 978-0-8248-8366-9. OCLC 1126516674.
- Andrade, Ernest (1996). Unconquerable Rebel: Robert W. Wilcox and Hawaiian Politics, 1880–1903. Niwot, CO: University Press of Colorado. ISBN 978-0-87081-417-4. OCLC 247224388.
- Kuykendall, Ralph Simpson (1967). The Hawaiian Kingdom 1874–1893, The Kalakaua Dynasty. Vol. 3. Honolulu: University of Hawaii Press. ISBN 978-0-87022-433-1. OCLC 500374815.
- Hamilton, Richard F. (July 5, 2017). America's New Empire: The 1890s and Beyond. Routledge. ISBN 9781351532174.
- Taylor, Samuel W. "Walter Murray Gibson: Great Mormon Rascal" American West (00031534). (1964) 1#2 pp 18–28.

Government offices
| Preceded by William L. Green | Kingdom of Hawaii Minister of Foreign Affairs; May 1882 – June 1886 | Succeeded by Robert J. Creighton |
| Preceded by Edward Preston | Acting Kingdom of Hawaii Attorney General; May 1883 – December 1883 | Succeeded by Paul Neumann |
| Preceded by John E. Bush | Acting Kingdom of Hawaii Minister of the Interior; July 1883 – August 1883 | Succeeded by Charles T. Gulick |
| Preceded by Charles T. Gulick | Kingdom of Hawaii Minister of the Interior; June 1886 – October 1886 | Succeeded by Luther Aholo |
| Preceded by Robert J. Creighton | Kingdom of Hawaii Minister of Foreign Affairs; October 1886 – July 1887 | Succeeded by William L. Green |
