= Celso Caesar Moreno =

Italian politician

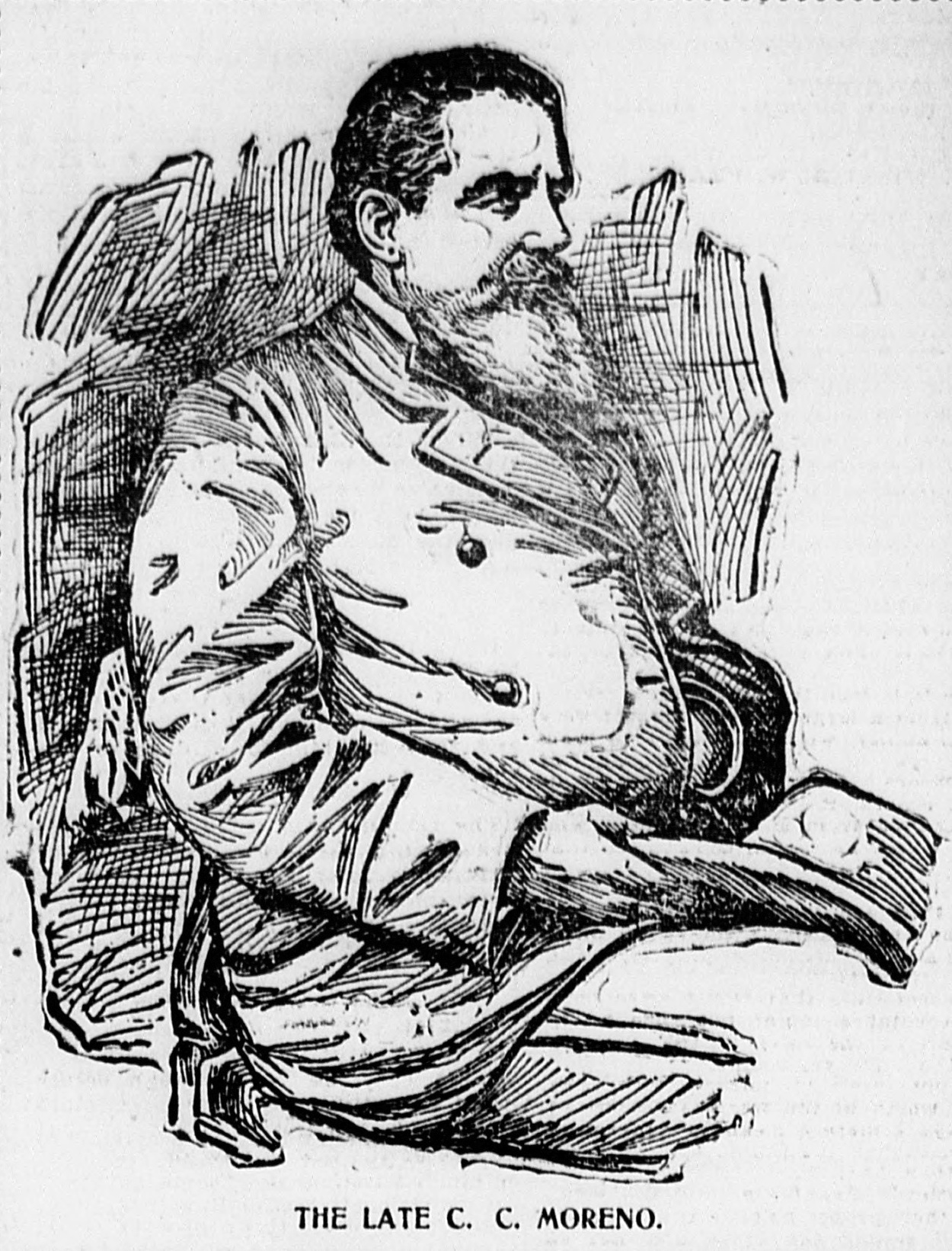
Celso Caesar Moreno

Celso Caesar Moreno (1830 – March 12, 1901) was an Italian adventurer and a controversial political figure on the world stage, and Minister of Foreign Affairs of Hawaii under Kalākaua. Born in Italy, he fought in the Crimean War and lived throughout Asia, Hawaii and the United States, often taking sides with the indigenous underdog against British imperialism (though a promoter of Italian imperialist dreams). He moved from one career to another, one grand scheme to another, often trying to convince governments to pay huge sums of money for his proposals. His efforts at establishing a trans-Pacific telegraph cable got official government authorization, but no financial backers. He became a naturalized American citizen in 1878, and a naturalized citizen of Hawaii in 1880. Moreno spent his final years living in Washington, D. C., trying to eliminate the padrone system that created slavery conditions within the Italian immigrant labor force.

== Early life ==
Celso Caesar Moreno, also known as Cesare Moreno and C. C. Moreno, was born into a Roman Catholic family in the Piedmont region of Italy at Dogliani. According to testimony he gave in an 1896 court trial, he was born in 1830, and became a naturalized United States citizen in California in 1878. His family was financially well off enough to send him to private Catholic schools where he became fluent in multiple languages. After furthering his education at a military academy, Moreno enlisted in the Piedmontese regular army, serving in the Crimean War. Before the war's end, he decided against a military career, and enrolled in the University of Genoa, graduating as a civil engineer in 1856.

== Asia ==
Moreno spent the years 1855-64 in Asia, where documentation is sparse to confirm his own self-promoting accounts, which show him always on the side opposing British (and Dutch) imperialism. After coming to sympathise with Turkish Muslims by fighting with Piedmont's army in the Crimean War, Moreno made his way to British India where according to his own account he became intimate with the rebels in the Indian Mutiny, notably Nana Sahib, whose anti-British words he quotes approvingly; "The palm of barbarity and cruelty consummated in India...does not belong to us black and barbarous Indians, but rather to the white and civilized English …The East India Company was the most immoral and rapacious institution that history can commemorate". Moreno claimed to have then journeyed to Rangoon, newly conquered by the British, where he sympathetically interviewed the captive last Mughal sultan, Bahadur Shah.

Moreno then travelled to Bangkok and down the Peninsula, whence he took a Malay vessel to the independent sultanate of Aceh, North Sumatra, in 1858-9. A good linguist, including in Arabic and Malay, he there called himself Mustafa Vizir, exploited his past links with Ottoman Turkey and anti-British Muslim India and even associated himself with the legendary Muslim kingdom of Rum (sharing the aura of Alexander the Great, ancient Rome, Byzantium and the Ottomans) by calling himself a citizen of Rome. This certainly would have impressed the ruling Sultan Alauddin Ibrahim Mansur Syah 1859–1862, who had revived the 16th century Aceh link with Turkey and asked for its protection, as well as exploring an anti-Dutch alliance with France. Moreno made much in the US and especially Italy of having married a beautiful princess, Ibrahim's daughter, but was quiet about the corollary of that evident fact, that he must have presented himself as a Muslim.

Moreno claims to have left Aceh on foot, travelling through independent Batak territory in Sumatra's interior, before continuing his journey eastward to Vietnam and China. The Taiping rebellion was raging in China in the early 1860s, and Moreno was drawn to it ‘like a moth to a candle,’ to quote his Italian biographer. There we have an external source, Augustus Frederick Lindley, the American mercenary recruiting European soldiers to fight for the Taiping rebel cause. He insists that "Major Moreno" was his star recruit whom he planned to put in command of his whole foreign legion. This would have been consistent with his anti-Imperial stance, which may however have been changing at about this time. When talking to American journalists later, Moreno stated that while he didn't want to judge the Taipings, "they have caused enormous damage to China". He then implied that he was on the other side, an intimate of the Manchu's chief American mercenary,Frederick Townsend Ward. Moreno's contacts in the East included Li Hongzhang, the Viceroy of Zhili, who founded the China Merchants' Steam Navigation Company with a vision towards establishing a steamship line between China and California. Li Hongzhang had already begun formulating plans for a trans-Pacific telegraph line. Moreno would become a key player in both projects.

== Italian imperial dreams ==
Moreno returned to Italy in 1864, and the following year submitted to the Italian Government, provisionally in Florence, a 17-page proposal for Italian expansion to include a treaty to defend Aceh in exchange for the small island of Pulo Wei (Sabang) near Banda Aceh that Moreno absurdly claimed had already been given him "forever" by the Sultan. He spent much of the next two years lobbying effectively for this scheme, impressing King Victor Emmanuel II with his descriptions of the waiting tropical paradise. A principal supporter was the Risorgimento hero Nino Bixio, who succeeded in having a 3-man commission including himself look into the proposal (and who was so enthused that he later commissioned his own vessel to go to Aceh in 1873, where he died of cholera). More cautious ministers however torpedoed the proposal after establishing that Britain and the Netherlands would definitely resist it.

== The United States ==
Moreno showed up in Washington D. C. in 1868, as the "White Chief Mustapha Moreno", trying to sell the United States government an unnamed Malaysian island, and his services as an envoy to the island, for $500,000. The story he gave to newspapers, is that he discovered the inhabited island in February 1862, "took possession in his own name", and was elected the White Chief Mustapha by the locals. He was making the offer, he said, as a promise to the island's inhabits that in selling the island they would have the protection of the United States. A newspaper mention inferred that Secretary of State William H. Seward, who had negotiated the 1867 Alaska Purchase, was in favor of the sale; however, nobody took Moreno up on the offer.

In 1869, he published American Interests in Asia, a 40-page pamphlet urging the United States to expand its sphere of influence by establishing treaties, "territorial concessions" and naval stations in Asia. He, in fact, suggested that the US team with Russia to divide up India between themselves. President Ulysses S. Grant allowed Moreno an audience to expound on the subject.

As a representative of the American and Asiatic Telegraph Company, Moreno promoted Li Hongzhang's idea of an undersea telegraph cable between Asia and the mainland United States. He spent time in California lobbying among influential leaders in hopes of gaining financial support for the project, then began lobbying the United States Congress. Senator Frederick Theodore Frelinghuysen introduced a bill on May 18, 1874, to grant a charter to Moreno and thirteen others for the construction and maintenance of the trans-Pacific cable. Moreno addressed Congress four months later on September 26, detailing the specifics of the proposal. A bill was passed and signed by President Grant, for a non-exclusive charter requiring the project to begin no later than three years after the bill's August 15, 1876 passage. Subsequent fund raising efforts for the project were unsuccessful, and the deadline expired without the cable being started.

== Kingdom of Hawaii ==
=== King Kalākaua ===
When Congress was considering Moreno's telegraph cable charter in 1874, Kalākaua was in the nation's capital as head of the Kingdom of Hawaii delegation negotiating the Reciprocity Treaty of 1875. According to journalist Helen Geracimos Chapin, that is the place and time period the two first became acquainted. Hawaiian historian Ralph Simpson Kuykendall pinpointed the same time frame, but placed their first meeting at San Francisco. The December 1, 1874 issue of the San Francisco Chronicle report of the king's trip attests to their first meeting being during a public reception held by Kalākaua in San Francisco's Grand Hotel. Moreno first approached the king as owner of three telegraph cable charter companies, regaling Kalākaua with tales of his global adventures.

Moreno arrived in Honolulu, November 14, 1879, on the Chinese steamer Ho-Chung as the official representative of the China Merchants' Steam Navigation Company, empowered to negotiate with the Kingdom of Hawaii. Among its regular line of business, the steamer ferried Chinese contract laborers to Hawaii and the United States; 451 laborers arrived with Moreno. American minister to Hawaii General James M. Comly described Moreno as a gregarious personality, who ingratiated himself through frequent visits to the palace. Kalākaua believed that Moreno held similar perspectives to his own on many issues. Moreno got Kalākaua to press the legislature on June 1, 1880 for an $18,000 annual trade subsidy for the company. The proposal was sent to a committee composed of George Washington Pilipō, Minister of the Interior Samuel Gardner Wilder, Godfrey Rhodes, John L. Kaulukou, and John K. Hanuna. The committee recommended against it on the basis that there was no market in China for Hawaiian exports, and that providing a subsidy might result in the reverse effect of Chinese imports glutting the Hawaiian market. The legislature concurred with the recommendation of the committee.

In spite of the expiration of the telegraph cable legislation, Moreno managed to convince Kalākaua and the legislature in the first week of July, to pass a resolution guaranteeing him a $1,000,000 bonus in gold coins upon completion of the cable. Trying to make himself look more influential than he was, Moreno claimed to be a close associate of James A. Garfield, who was at that time a candidate (and subsequent winner) in the United States presidential election. Comly asked Garfield directly about the alleged relation, with Garfield issuing a strong denial. It was only through legislative intervention by Wilder that the resolution was defeated.

His efforts at overturning Hawaii's stringent opium laws, and acquiring a monopoly on the manufacture and distribution of the drug for trafficking in the Pacific area, were almost successful. It took several weeks, and three different versions of the verbiage, but the legislature passed an opium bill on July 30 that would grant a two-year $120,000 per-annum license. Added to the final version of the bill was a $24,000 subsidy for the China Merchants' Steam Navigation Company. When it reached Kalākaua for his signature, he vetoed it.

The king had been at odds with his ministers for some time, and dismissed his entire cabinet on August 14, 1880, the same day Moreno became a naturalized citizen of Hawaii. Moreno replaced Minister of Foreign Affairs John Mākini Kapena. Wilder was replaced by John E. Bush as Minister of the Interior. Attorney General Edward Preston was replaced by W. Claude Jones. Minister of Finance Simon Kaloa Kaai was replaced by Moses Kuaea. The diplomatic corps stationed in Hawaii refused to acknowledge Moreno's position, and Comly privately tried to reason with the king about the inappropriateness of having Moreno in the cabinet. Mass meetings were held in Honolulu, and community leaders urged Kalākaua to remove him. On August 18, Kalākaua accepted Moreno's resignation from the cabinet.

=== Robert Wilcox and John Colburn ===
On August 30, Moreno left Honolulu for Italy, as guardian of Robert Napuʻuako Boyd, Robert William Wilcox and James Kaneholo Booth, the first students under the new Education of Hawaiian Youths Abroad. When Kalākaua visited Italy on his 1881 world tour, he learned Moreno had misrepresented the young men as Kalākaua's family. Although Moreno was immediately removed as their guardian, Wilcox maintained contact with him for years.

When the 1887 Bayonet Constitution ended his funding, Wilcox was forced to return to Hawaii. On July 30, 1889, he led 150 insurrectionists in a failed attempt at forcing Kalākaua into reverting to the 1864 Constitution. A published letter from Moreno to Wilcox was indicative that Wilcox relied on him for political advice and reassurance. After the 1891 death of Kalākaua, his sister Liliuokalani became regent and was deposed in the 1893 overthrow of the Kingdom of Hawaii. Published correspondence from Wilcox to Moreno is affirmation that Wilcox believed Moreno had enough political ties in Washington D. C. to influence the events in Honolulu. Shortly before he led the failed 1895 Wilcox rebellion, he sent a letter to Moreno asking him to return to Hawaii to become Premier.

John F. Colburn, a Hawaii business man who was appointed the Minister of Interior of the Kingdom of Hawaii under Liliuokalani, also kept in touch with Moreno after his departure from Hawaii. When Liliuokalani tried to promulgate a new constitution, Colburn and the rest of her cabinet refused to sign it, an act that helped lead to the overthrow of the Kingdom of Hawaii. In spite of his role in those chain of events, Colburn penned a letter to Moreno in October 1893 expressing his hope for restoration of the monarchy and indemnity for the royalists who were loyal to Liliuokalani.

== Later years ==
Moreno stayed in Italy for a while after being removed as guardian of the three Hawaiian youths, and was a member of the Chamber of Deputies in the Kingdom of Italy until King Umberto I discharged all the deputies in 1882.

He eventually returned to Washington, D. C. where he was active in the Italian community, trying to abolish the padrone system (a form of slavery) existent at that time in contract labor from Italy. In 1886, he persuaded Congressman Henry B. Lovering of Massachusetts to introduce a bill to ban importation of slave contact labor from Italy into the United States. On July 11, 1895, Moreno was indicted for libel against Italian minister to the United States, Baron Saverio Fava. The libel case stemmed from an article written by Moreno and published in The Colored American. Therein, he referred to Fava as "Don Bassillo", the hypocrite in the Barber of Saville. Moreno accused Fava of corruption in using his position and influence to perpetuate the trafficking of slaves from Italy, while also reaping financial benefits from the practice. When the case was tried before a jury on October 29, Moreno testified that he had never had any contact with Fava or evidence upon which to base his claims, but rather wrote the article on hearsay. The jury rendered a guilty verdict the same day. Moreno served 90 days jail time.

Congress once again began to consider legislation on a trans-Pacific telegraph cable in 1895. Moreno unsuccessfully lobbied the United States House of Representatives for an extension of his 1876 charter for construction and maintenance of the cable.

In the last year of his life, an endorsement allegedly from Moreno for the patent medicine Peruna appeared in newspapers. Peruna was marketed to ease or cure catarrh, and had an alcohol content of 28%. Moreno was not the only public figure reputed to endorse the product. The manufacturer ran ads with testimonials from well-known doctors, athletes, entertainment celebrities, and members of the United States Congress. Years after Moreno's death, investigative journalist Samuel Hopkins Adams found that the endorsements were often fakes, or the results of blackmail.

== Death ==
Moreno died of a stroke on March 11, 1901, having collapsed on a Washington D. C. sidewalk the day before. He was financially destitute at the time of his death. Local Italian societies took care of the arrangements, and he was buried in a donated plot at St. Mary's Catholic Church cemetery.

Three months after Moreno's death, Baron Fava was recalled "at his own request" to Italy. An editorial in the Barton County Democrat disdained the continuing padrone system, blaming the Italian government for encouraging it and stating that Fava ran interference whenever the United States immigration officials tried to intervene. Moreno had been correct in his accusations, just incorrect in how he had gone about it.
