= Moses Kuaea =

Hawaiian politician

Hawaiian Kingdom Minister of Finance
- In office August 14, 1880 – September 27, 1880
- Monarch: Kalākaua
- Preceded by: Simon Kaloa Kaʻai
- Succeeded by: John Smith Walker

Member of the Hawaiian Kingdom Privy Council of State
- In office July 3, 1878 – 1882
- Monarch: Kalākaua

Personal details
- Born: c. 1824
- Died: May 5, 1884 (aged 60) Honolulu, Oahu, Hawaiian Kingdom
- Spouse(s): First wife Tamar Makahiki Kuaea
- Relations: Moses Kuaea Nākuina
- Children: 3

Moses Kuaea (c. 1824 – May 5, 1884) was a Native Hawaiian clergyman and politician of the Hawaiian Kingdom. He was pastor of the Kaumakapili Church from 1874 to 1882 and was known as an eloquent preacher. During his time at the pulpit, he helped fundraise for the second building of the church which was completed in 1888 and later burned down in 1900. In 1874, he gave a speech lauding the new elected King Kalākaua prior to his state visit to the United States. After Kalākaua's return to Hawaii, he appointed Kuaea a member of the Privy Council of State and as his Minister of Finance from August 14 to September 27, 1880. After his brief stint in politic, Kuaea returned to preaching at Kaumakapili until his resignation in 1882 due to illness. He died in 1884.

== Early life ==
Kuaea's birthdate is not known. His obituary stated he was about sixty years old at the time of his death, which gives a birth year around 1824.

American missionary historian Orramel Hinckley Gulick, writing in 1918, stated that Kuaea was rescued from a hole in ground in which his parents planned to bury him alive in an act of infanticide, and was raised by the passerby who rescued him. According to Gulick, Kuaea "stated that he took the name of Moses, probably upon the occasion of his baptism, for the reason that as Pharaoh's daughter called the infant's name Moses, and said: 'Because I drew him out of the water,' so he, himself, had been drawn out of the ground". Kuaea was raised and educated by the American missionaries. Modern research has cast doubt on missionary accounts of Hawaiian infanticide. His obituary in the missionary newspaper The Friend called him Matthew Kuaea.

Kuaea was a member of the ʻAhahui ʻEuanelio Hawaiʻi (Hawaiian Evangelical Association), for which he wrote the article "Culture, Sale, and Use of Awa" in 1866. Scholar Jean Charlot described him as "a writer of superior Hawaiian, for example, employing an extensive and precise vocabulary to describe the production and use of ʻawa while strongly condemning the use of ‘awa and the relaxation of laws against it, he provided a rich description of its place in classical Hawaiian culture—including sayings, prayers, and religious and medical uses—and also of its syncretistic use with Christian elements." Kuaea also wrote a revision of Lorenzo Lyons' Haʻawina Mua (First Lessons), a Sunday school book published in 1878. He also served as an advisor to the Hawaiian language newspaper Ka Nupepa Kuokoa.

Missionary descendant and First Lady of Hawaii Mary Dillingham Frear wrote that "Kuaea is remembered by child eyes as an unusually handsome figure—a man of fine physique with beautiful white hair and a face and bearing often likened to Henry Ward Beecher".

In 1870, the American newspaper Hartford Courant described Kuaea as the "Daniel Webster of Hawaii".

== Pastor of Kaumakapili Church ==
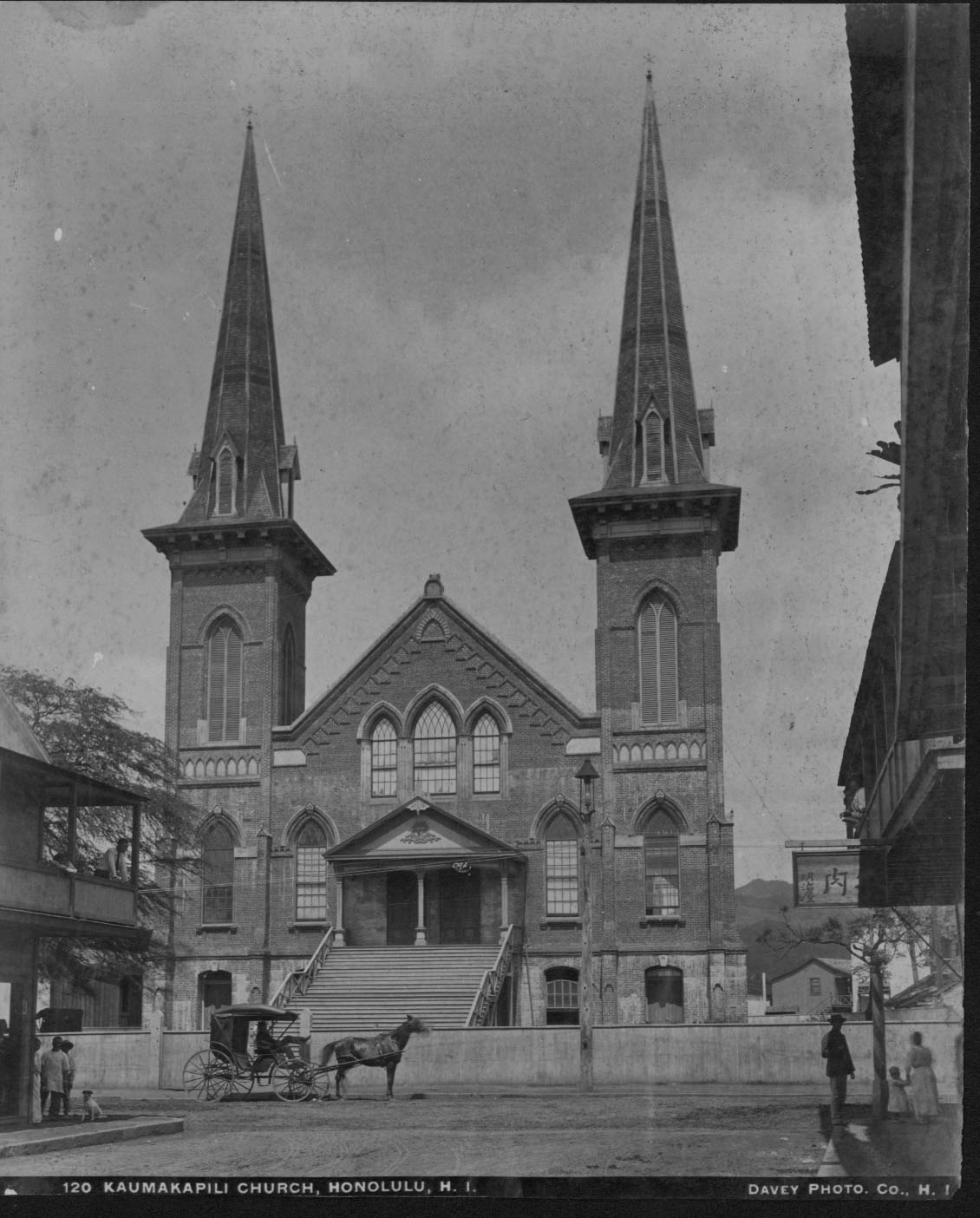
Kaumakapili Church, before it burned down, c. 1897–1900

Kuaea served as pastor of the native church at Hauʻula, Oahu, and later at the church of American missionary John Smith Emerson at Waialua, Oahu. In 1874, Kuaea was appointed the pastor of Kaumakapili Church, the church for common people in Honolulu, succeeding George Washington Pilipō. He held this post until illness forced him to resign in 1882. He lived for months under languishing conditions until his resignation was accepted. He was succeeded by the interim pastor Henry Waterhouse from 1882 to 1883 before the appointment of Hawaiian pastor John Waiamau, who served until 1896.

During his pastorship, Kuaea was active in raising funds for the building of the second church building for Kaumakapili. He tore down the original church building. Construction on the new structure began in 1881 with the laying of the cornerstone by Princess Liliʻuokalani (the future queen) on September 2 and was completed on June 10, 1888 (after Kuaea's death). This edifice burned down in the Great Honolulu Chinatown Fire of 1900, which was started to control an outbreak of bubonic plague.

On November 16, 1874, during King Kalākaua's 38th birthday morning services at Kawaiahaʻo Church prior to his state visit to the United States, Kuaea gave a speech to the king and the assembled worshipers at the church. Considered an eloquent preacher, he offered a prayer, praised the king's efforts to save the nation's agricultural interest, and asked for the people to pray for the king's safety during his upcoming trip.

== Political career ==
On, December 5, 1876, Kuaea was appointed a member of the commission to Increase the Original Hawaiian Race. This commission was part of Kalākaua's vision of Hoʻolulu Lāhui (increasing the nation), an effort to combat the depopulation of the Native Hawaiian people. He served on the Privy Council of State from June 5, 1879, to 1882.

On August 14, 1880, Kalākaua appointed Kuaea as the Minister of Finance. The king had been at odds with his cabinet ministers for some time, and dismissed his entire cabinet on August 14. He appointed a new cabinet with Italian adventurer Celso Caesar Moreno as the Minister of Foreign Affairs, John E. Bush as the Minister of the Interior, W. Claude Jones as the Attorney General, and Kuaea as the Minister of Finance. Out of these men, only Bush had any significant political experience. The American minister to Hawaii James M. Comly described this group as "for the most part grotesque in unfitness". The foreign diplomatic corps stationed in Hawaii refused to acknowledge the new cabinet, especially Moreno. Mass meetings were held in Honolulu, including at Kaumakapili Church, and community leaders urged Kalākaua to remove Moreno. On August 18, Kalākaua accepted Moreno's resignation from the cabinet.

On September 22, William Lowthian Green was appointed foreign minister in place of Moreno with the intention of retaining Kuaea and Bush. Jones, a second-rate lawyer, was expected to resign. However, the king dismissed the entire cabinet on September 27, retaining only Green. John Smith Walker replaced Kuaea as finance minister.

== Personal life ==
On September 8, 1870, Kuaea married Tamar Makahiki (1851–1899), a student of American missionary Maria Ogden at the Kawaiahaʻo Seminary for Girls, as his second wife. They had three children. Their daughter Esther U. Kuala Kuakea (1874–1944) attended the Kawaiahaʻo Seminary for Girls, married Solomon David Koki in 1896, and had two children.

Kuaea died on May 5, 1884, at Waikahalulu, his residence in Honolulu, at the age of sixty. The cause of death was reported as "a softening of the brain", likely a stroke. He was survived by his widow and three children. His funeral, officiated by the first pastor of Kaumakapili, Lowell Smith, on May 6, was well-attended. Members of the Hawaiian legislature attended his funeral and wore an emblem of mourning out of respect for Kuaea's former association with the government.

His nephew and namesake was Moses Kuaea Nākuina (1867–1911), a politician, novelist, and traveling evangelist of the Hawaiian Evangelical Association, who married Hawaiian female judge Emma Kaʻili Metcalf Beckley Nākuina.

== Bibliography ==
- Alexander, James McKinney (1895). The Islands of the Pacific. Honolulu: American Tract Society. OCLC 1062952772.
- Bacchilega, Cristina (2007). "Emma Nakuina's Hawaii: Its People, Their Legends: Out of Place Stories II". Legendary Hawaiʻi and the Politics of Place: Tradition, Translation, and Tourism. Philadelphia: University of Pennsylvania Press. pp. 102–136. ISBN 978-0-8122-0117-8. OCLC 759158207.
- Charlot, Jean (2005). Moses Kuaea Nakuina: Hawaiian Novelist (PDF). Laie, HI: Pacific Institute, Brigham Young Brigham Young University–Hawaii. ISBN 978-0-939154-71-5. OCLC 64686034.
- Frear, Mary Dillingham (1938). "A Brief Record of Kaumakapili Church" (PDF). Forty-Sixth Annual Report of the Hawaiian Historical Society for the Year 1937. 46. Honolulu: Hawaiian Historical Society: 14–26. hdl:10524/82.
- Gulick, Orramel Hinckley; Gulick, Ann Eliza Clark (1918). The Pilgrims of Hawaii: Their Own Story of Their Pilgrimage from New England and Life Work in the Sandwich Islands, Now Known as Hawaii. New York, Chicago: Fleming H. Revell Company. OCLC 752322844.
- Hopkins, Jaime Uluwehi (August 2012). Hānau Ma Ka Lolo, For the Benefit of Her Race: a Portrait of Emma Kaʻilikapuolono Metcalf Beckley Nakuina (PDF) (Thesis). Honolulu: University of Hawaii at Manoa. hdl:10125/100964.
- Kanahele, George S. (1999). Emma: Hawaii's Remarkable Queen. Honolulu: University of Hawaii Press. ISBN 978-0-8248-2240-8. OCLC 40890919.
- Kuykendall, Ralph Simpson (1967). The Hawaiian Kingdom 1874–1893, The Kalakaua Dynasty. Vol. 3. Honolulu: University of Hawaii Press. ISBN 978-0-87022-433-1. OCLC 500374815.
- Morris, Nancy J.; Benedetto, Robert (2019). Nā Kahu: Portraits of Native Hawaiian Pastors at Home and Abroad, 1820–1900. Honolulu: University of Hawaii Press. ISBN 978-0-8248-7777-4. OCLC 1098290393.
- Silva, Noenoe K. (2004). Aloha Betrayed: Native Hawaiian Resistance to American Colonialism. Durham: Duke University Press. ISBN 0-8223-8622-4. OCLC 191222123.
- Tobin, Jeffrey (March 1997). "Savages, the Poor and the Discourse of Hawaiian Infanticide". The Journal of the Polynesian Society. 106 (1). Wellington: The Polynesian Society: 65–92. JSTOR 20706692. OCLC 6015486512.
- Winter, Carrie Prudence (2012). Bonura, Sandra; Day, Deborah (eds.). An American Girl in the Hawaiian Islands: Letters of Carrie Prudence Winter, 1890–1893. Honolulu: University of Hawaii Press. ISBN 978-0-8248-3722-8. OCLC 821735443 – via Project MUSE.
