= John Mākini Kapena =

Hawaiian politician (1843–1887)

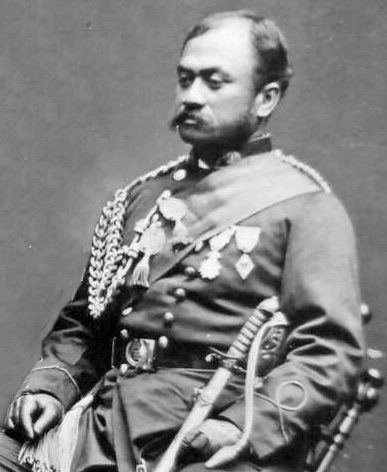
- John Mākini Kapena, 1874

Governor of Maui
- In office February 23, 1874 – December 15, 1876
- Preceded by: Paul Nahaolelua
- Succeeded by: William Luther Moehonua

Minister of Finance
- In office December 5, 1876 – July 3, 1878
- Preceded by: John Smith Walker
- Succeeded by: Simon Kaloa Kaʻai
- In office February 13, 1883 – June 30, 1886
- Preceded by: Simon Kaloa Kaʻai
- Succeeded by: Paul P. Kanoa

Minister of Foreign Affairs
- In office July 3, 1878 – August 14, 1880
- Preceded by: Henry A. Peirce
- Succeeded by: Celso Caesar Moreno

Personal details
- Born: October 2, 1843 Lāhainā, Maui, Kingdom of Hawaiʻi
- Died: October 23, 1887 (aged 44)
- Spouse: Emma Aʻalailoa Malo
- Relations: Jonah Kapena (uncle); David Malo (father-in-law)
- Children: Alexandrina Leihulu Kapena
- Education: Royal School; Oahu College
- Occupation: Politician

John Mākini Kapena (October 2, 1843 – October 23, 1887) was a politician, diplomat and newspaper editor who served many political roles in the Kingdom of Hawaii. He served as Governor of Maui from 1874 to 1876, Minister of Finance from 1876 to 1878 and again from 1883 to 1886, Minister of Foreign Affairs from 1878 to 1880, Postmaster General from 1881 to 1883 and Collector General of Customs from 1886 to 1887. From 1874 to 1875, he accompanied King Kalākaua on his state visit to the United States to negotiate the Reciprocity Treaty of 1875. In 1882, he traveled to Tokyo as Envoy Extraordinary and Minister Plenipotentiary to the Court of Japan to negotiate Japanese immigration to Hawaii.

== Early life and family ==
Born on October 2, 1843, at Lāhainā, on the island of Maui, Kapena was the son of Mākini and High Chiefess Nāʻawa, a relative of the Kalākaua family. He was adopted under the Hawaiian custom of hānai by his uncle Jonah Kapena, an influential statesman, judge and royal advisor since the reign of King Kamehameha III (r. 1825–1854).

Kapena was educated at the Royal School and later at the Oahu College. In 1863 he married Emma Aʻalailoa Malo (1846–1886), the only daughter of early Native Hawaiian historian and Christian minister David Malo and his third wife Rebecca Lepeka. Emma was an accomplished musician and composer and served as an attendant of Princess Liliʻuokalani. Emma died unexpectedly from heart disease on April 18, 1886, at the age of 39.

They had one daughter, Alexandrina Leihulu Kapena (1868–1914). On November 5, 1887, Leihulu married Morris Kahai Keohokālole of Maui. She later divorced Keohokālole and married Henry N. Clark after he divorced his wife Emma Dreier. Leihulu owned property on Hawaii and the mainland United States. She died on March 23, 1914, while living in San Francisco, California. She was the last lineal descendant of David Malo. Leihulu died intestate and her estate was disputed between her widower and her two next of kin: Samuel I. Maikai and David U. K. Maikai (grandsons of John William Elliott Maikai). The Hawaii Supreme Court ruled in favor of her widower as her sole heir.

== Editor ==
In 1870, Kapena became the editor of the newspaper Ke Au Okoa, which ran from 1865 until it merged with Ka Nupepa Kuokoa to become Ka Nupepa Kuokoa Me Ke Au Okoa I Huiia in 1873.

== Political career ==
=== Earlier career ===
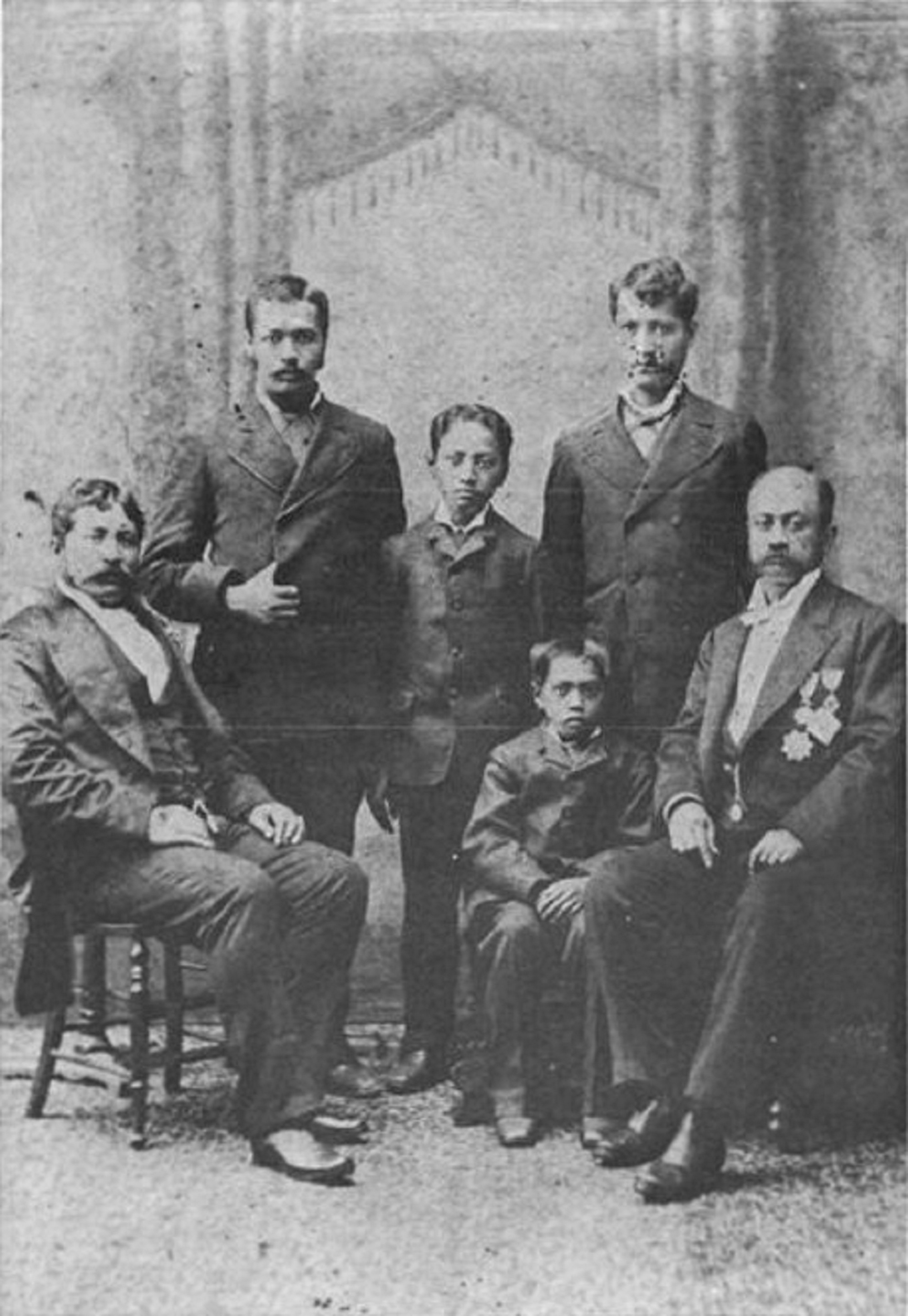
John Mākini Kapena (far right) with John Lot Kaulukoʻu (far left) and three Hawaiian students in San Francisco en route to Japan and China, 1882

During the reign of Kamehameha V (r. 1864–1872), he was commissioned on January 16, 1864, as first lieutenant of the 1st Company of the Yeomanry, a volunteer army regiment in the military of Hawaii. When King Lunalilo ascended to the throne in 1873, Kapena was appointed to a number of political positions. He was appointed to the Board of Education on January 23. He was made a colonel on the king's personal military staff on January 27, and judge of the first circuit court on the island of Oahu, serving in the latter position from April 1, 1873, to July 13, 1874. In July 1873, King Lunalilo and his foreign minister Charles Reed Bishop considered a proposal to cede Pearl Harbor to the United States in exchange for a reciprocity treaty. Although he was in favor of the reciprocity treaty, Kapena gave a speech in front of 1500 Hawaiians at Kaumakapili Church opposing the cessation of Hawaiian territory.

=== Patronage by Kalākaua ===
Lunalilo died without an heir in 1874. In the election that followed, Kapena supported his relative David Kalākaua's candidacy for the vacant throne against Queen Emma, the dowager queen of Kamehameha IV (r. 1855–1864). The choice of Kalākaua by the legislature, and the subsequent announcement, caused a riot at the courthouse. US and British troops were landed, and some of Emma's supporters were arrested.

As part of his first round of political appointments, Kalākaua appointed Kapena as a member of the Privy Council of State and the Governor of Maui, succeeding Paul Nahaolelua, who had resigned the governorship to become Minister of Finance. Kapena served as Governor of Maui from February 23, 1874 until December 15, 1876, when he too resigned the governorship to become Minister of Finance. He was succeeded by William Luther Moehonua as governor. On January 10, 1876, Kapena was appointed by the king to be an official member of the House of Nobles, the upper chamber of the legislature. As a member of the House of Nobles, Kapena served in every legislative session between 1876 and 1886.

From November 17, 1874, to February 15, 1875, Kapena was a member of the Reciprocity Commission and traveled with Kalākaua on his state visit the United States to negotiate the Reciprocity Treaty of 1875.

Kapena held various important cabinet positions during Kalākaua's reign. In 1876, Kapena was appointed to the king's cabinet as Minister of Finance serving alongside three Americans: Henry A. P. Carter, Minister of Foreign Affairs; John Mott-Smith, Minister of the Interior; and Alfred S. Hartwell, Attorney General. He served as the finance minister from December 5, 1876, until Kalākaua demanded the resignation of his entire cabinet in the middle of the night on July 1, 1878. It was widely suspected that Kalākaua's sudden replacement of his cabinet was influenced by American businessman Claus Spreckels, who had refinanced the King's debts the night before in order to secure water rights for his sugarcane plantation on Maui. On July 3, Kapena was appointed as the Minister of Foreign Affairs in a new cabinet with Samuel Gardner Wilder, Minister of the Interior; Simon Kaloa Kaʻai, Minister of Finance; and Edward Preston, Attorney General. Kapena became the first Native Hawaiian to hold the post of foreign minister and the only minister to survive the political shakeup. He held this post from July 3, 1878, to August 14, 1880. During his tenure, the elders (na elemakule) of Tabiteuea in the Gilbert Islands requested annexation to Hawaii. However, Kapena and the king wrote back declining the request due to its political impractically. When the king chose a new cabinet in 1880, Kapena was replaced in the position by the Italian adventurer Celso Caesar Moreno to the vehement opposition of the diplomatic corps and political leaders in Honolulu. Kapena later returned to another cabinet headed by Walter Murray Gibson when he was appointed Minister of Finance for a second term in February 1883 after Kaʻai was removed for "dereliction of ministerial duty." He served as finance minister until June 30, 1886, although Minister of the Interior Charles T. Gulick served as acting finance minister while he was attending the Louisville Exposition in 1885 as Special Commissioner. He was succeeded by Paul P. Kanoa.

He also served as the Postmaster General from 1881 to 1883 and the Collector General of Customs from 1886 to 1887. Other political posts and appointments he held during his political career included Marshal of the Household, member of the Board of Education, Commissioner of Boundaries for Maui, Commissioner of Crown Lands, Commissioner to Codify and Revise Laws and Registrar of Conveyances for Oahu. In 1872, he was appointed as the Envoy Extraordinary and Minister Plenipotentiary to the Court of Japan. Along with his secretary John Lot Kaulukoʻu, he traveled to Japan to negotiate the prospect of Japanese immigration to the Hawaiian Islands. As part of the Education of Hawaiian Youths Abroad governmental program, Kapena also escorted three Hawaiian students to study in Asia. James Kapaa was placed in a school in Canton, China, and James Hakuole and Isaac Harbottle were placed in schools in Japan.

Kapena was decorated with a number of Hawaiian and foreign orders and honors. He was made a Knight Companion of the Royal Order of Kamehameha I, a Grand Officer of the Royal Order of the Crown of Hawaii and a Grand Officer of the Royal Order of Kalākaua. He was also accorded the foreign honors of the Grand Cross of the Order of the Rising Sun of Japan, Grand Officer of the Order of the Cross of Takovo of Serbia, Grand Officer of the Order of the Crown of Prussia, Grand Cross of the Order of the Crown of Japan and the Belgian Red Cross.

== Death ==
In 1887, Kapena resigned his last political post as Collector General of Customs. Kapena died at his residence at Peleula, Honolulu, on October 23, 1887, at the age of 44.

Kapena's funeral at St. Andrew's Cathedral the following day was attended by the King, members of the royal family, ranking members of the government and Honolulu society, Viscount Torii and T. Fujita of the Japanese legation, the Lodge Le Progres de L'Oceanie and the Hawaiian Lodge No. 21, F. & A. M., where he was a member. His service was conducted entirely in Hawaiian by Anglican Reverend Alexander Mackintosh with Reverend H. H. Gowen also in the chancel. His daughter Leihulu served as the chief mourner. After the service, a funeral procession brought the hearse carrying his casket to Kawaiahaʻo Church where he was buried with Masonic rites. Kapena was buried next to his wife Emma Malo and his hānai father Jonah Kapena in the Kapena family plot. His grave marker reads, "J. M. Kapena Died Oct 23 1887." Other relatives interred there include Umiuimi, David Kalu and Kahoihoi Pahu.

== Bibliography ==
- Adler, Jacob (July 1965). "The Maui Land Deal: A Chapter in Claus Spreckels' Hawaiian Career". Agricultural History. 39 (3). Honolulu: University of Hawaii Press: 155–163. JSTOR 3740255. OCLC 5546646806.
- Alexander, William DeWitt (1891). A Brief History of the Hawaiian People. New York: American Book Company. OCLC 187412143.
- Dabagh, Jean; Lyons, Curtis Jere; Hitchcock, Harvey Rexford (1974). Dabagh, Jean (ed.). "A King is Elected: One Hundred Years Ago" (PDF). The Hawaiian Journal of History. 8. Honolulu: Hawaiian Historical Society: 76–89. hdl:10524/112. OCLC 60626541.
- Day, Arthur Grove (1984). History Makers of Hawaii: a Biographical Dictionary. Honolulu: Mutual Publishing of Honolulu. ISBN 978-0-935180-09-1. OCLC 11087565.
- Hawaii (1918). Lydecker, Robert Colfax (ed.). Roster Legislatures of Hawaii, 1841–1918. Honolulu: Hawaiian Gazette Company. OCLC 60737418.
- Kanahele, George S. (1999). Emma: Hawaii's Remarkable Queen. Honolulu: University of Hawaii Press. ISBN 978-0-8248-2240-8. OCLC 40890919.
- Kanahele, George S. (2002) [1986]. Pauahi: The Kamehameha Legacy. Honolulu: Kamehameha Schools Press. ISBN 978-0-87336-005-0. OCLC 173653971.
- Kuykendall, Ralph Simpson (1953). The Hawaiian Kingdom 1854–1874, Twenty Critical Years. Vol. 2. Honolulu: University of Hawaii Press. ISBN 978-0-87022-432-4. OCLC 47010821.
- Kuykendall, Ralph Simpson (1967). The Hawaiian Kingdom 1874–1893, The Kalakaua Dynasty. Vol. 3. Honolulu: University of Hawaii Press. ISBN 978-0-87022-433-1. OCLC 500374815.
- Liliuokalani (1898). Hawaii's Story by Hawaii's Queen, Liliuokalani. Boston: Lee and Shepard. ISBN 978-0-548-22265-2. OCLC 2387226.
- Malo, Davida; Emerson, Nathaniel Bright (1903). "Biographical Sketch Of David Malo". Hawaiian Antiquities: (Moolelo Hawaii). Honolulu: Hawaiian Gazette Co., Ltd. pp. 5–14. OCLC 317073334.
- McKinzie, Edith Kawelohea (1983). Stagner, Ishmael W. (ed.). Hawaiian Genealogies: Extracted from Hawaiian Language Newspapers. Vol. 1. Honolulu: University of Hawaii Press. ISBN 0-939154-28-5. OCLC 12555087.
- Mookini, Esther K. (1974). The Hawaiian Newspapers. Honolulu: Topgallant Publishing Company. OCLC 1009863.
- Newbury, Colin (2001). "Patronage and Bureaucracy in the Hawaiian Kingdom, 1840–1893". Pacific Studies. 24 (1–2). Laie, HI: Brigham Young University, Hawaii Campus: 1–38. ISSN 0275-3596. OCLC 193272210. Archived from the original on April 15, 2012.
- Quigg, Agnes (1988). "Kalakaua's Hawaiian Studies Abroad Program". The Hawaiian Journal of History. 22. Honolulu: Hawaiian Historical Society: 170–208. hdl:10524/103 – via eVols at University of Hawai'i at Manoa.
- Osorio, Jon Kamakawiwoʻole (2002). Dismembering Lāhui: A History of the Hawaiian Nation to 1887. Honolulu: University of Hawaii Press. ISBN 0-8248-2549-7. OCLC 48579247.
- Zambucka, Kristin (2002). Kalakaua: Hawaiʻi's Last King. Honolulu: Māna Publishing Company. ISBN 978-0-931897-04-7. OCLC 123305738.

Government offices
Preceded by Paul Nahaolelua	Governor of Maui; 1874–1876	Succeeded by William Luther Moehonua
Preceded by John Smith Walker	Minister of Finance; 1876–1878	Succeeded by Simon Kaloa Kaʻai
Preceded by Henry A. Peirce	Minister of Foreign Affairs; 1878–1880	Succeeded by Celso Caesar Moreno
Preceded by Arthur P. Brickwood	Postmaster General; 1881–1883	Succeeded by Henry Martyn Whitney
Preceded by Simon Kaloa Kaʻai	Minister of Finance; 1883–1886	Succeeded by Paul P. Kanoa
Preceded by Curtis P. Iaukea	Collector General of Customs; 1886–1887	Succeeded by Archibald Scott Cleghorn
