= John Smith Walker =

Hawaiian Kingdom finance minister

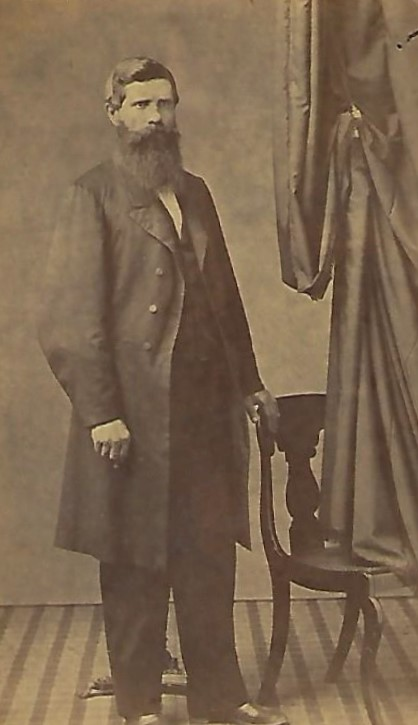
- John Smith Walker, c. 1865

Hawaiian Kingdom Minister of Finance
- In office October 31, 1874 – December 5, 1876
- Monarch: Kalākaua
- Preceded by: Paul Nahaolelua
- Succeeded by: John Mākini Kapena

Hawaiian Kingdom Attorney General
- In office November 5, 1875 – February 15, 1876
- Monarch: Kalākaua
- Preceded by: Richard H. Stanley
- Succeeded by: William Richards Castle

Hawaiian Kingdom Minister of Finance
- In office September 27, 1880 – May 20, 1882
- Monarch: Kalākaua
- Preceded by: Moses Kuaea
- Succeeded by: John E. Bush

Personal details
- Born: c. 1826 Aberdeen, Scotland
- Died: May 29, 1893 Honolulu, Hawaii
- Spouse: Jane McIntyre
- Children: 4

John Smith Walker (1826 – May 29, 1893) was Minister of Finance of the Hawaiian Kingdom, and interim Attorney General of the Kingdom of Hawaii, under King Kalākaua.

== Early life ==
He was born in Aberdeen, Scotland. As a teenager, he relocated to the United States. He tried his hand at various trades, including gold mining, eventually settling in California, where he became engaged in the mercantile business. In 1854, he sailed for Hawaii, intending to return to California. He eventually worked for Hackfield & Co. in Honolulu, and then Thomas Spencer, and became successful with his own import and export business in the kingdom.

== Cabinet minister ==
King Kalākaua appointed him Minister of Finance on November 7, 1874, during which he was a member of the House of Nobles in the legislature. The announcement cited Walker's business success in Hawaii as the factor in his being appointed. Within the next month, Walker publicly released "Statement of the Revenues and Expenditures of the Hawaiian Kingdom for eighteen years." In 1876, Walker left the cabinet to work for William G. Irwin. Along with Zephaniah Swift Spalding, Walker and Irwin organized William G. Irwin & Co.

In 1890, Kalākaua once again named him Minister of Finance, as well as ad interim Attorney General until William Nevins Armstrong accepted the position. He remained Minister of Finance until 1882. He was appointed to the Privy Council in 1886 and named as Auditor-General. Appointed once again to the House of Nobles, he became President of the legislature, and once again in 1890–1893.

During the Overthrow of the Kingdom of Hawaii, Walker was the one charged with delivering the message to Liliʻuokalani that her abdication was expected by the Provisional Government of Hawaii.

== Personal life ==
In 1866, he married Jane McIntyre of Hawaii, she also being of Scottish ancestry. The couple had five sons and five daughters. The Walker family remained friends with the Queen, and she commented in her book Hawaii's Story, that Walker's 1893 death within 4 months of the kingdom's overthrow was the result of "the treatment he received from the hands of the revolutionists."

== Bibliography ==
- Liliuokalani, Queen (1898). Hawaii's story by Hawaii's Queen, Liliuokalani. Boston, MA: Lothrop, Lee and Shepard Co. – via HathiTrust.
- Lydecker, Robert Colfax, ed. (1918). Roster Legislatures of Hawaii, 1841–1918. Honolulu: Hawaiian Gazette Company. OCLC 60737418.
