= Richard Stanley =

Richard Stanley may refer to:

- Richard H. Stanley (1823–1875), American lawyer and politician in the Kingdom of Hawaii
- Richard Stanley (politician) (1920–1983), British Conservative Party Member of Parliament, 1950–66
- Richard Charlie Stanley (born 1943), British-born film director and music producer who relocated to Finland
- Richard P. Stanley (born 1944), American mathematician
- Richard Stanley (director) (born 1966), South African-born film director and screenwriter
- Richard Stanley, an early stage name of the actor better known as Dennis Morgan
