= Antone Rosa =

Politician, lawyer and judge of the Kingdom of Hawaii

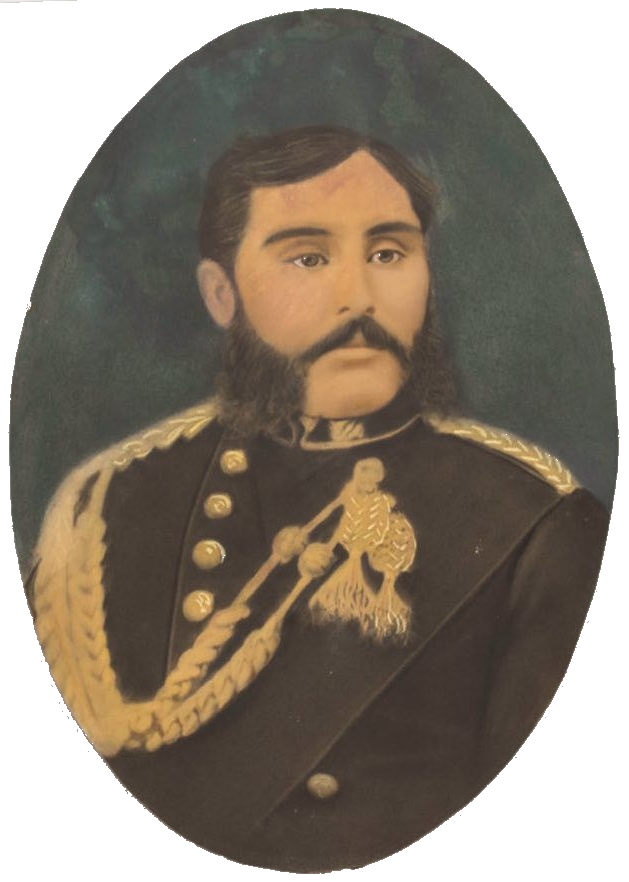

Kingdom of Hawaii Attorney General
- In office November 15, 1886 – June 28, 1887
- Monarch: Kalakaua
- Preceded by: John Lot Kaulukou
- Succeeded by: Clarence W. Ashford

Acting Governor of Oahu
- In office April 12, 1887 – July 7, 1887
- Monarch: Kalakaua
- Preceded by: Curtis P. Iaukea
- Succeeded by: Curtis P. Iaukea

Personal details
- Born: November 20, 1855 Kalae, Molokai, Kingdom of Hawaii
- Died: November 9, 1898 (aged 42) Honolulu, Oahu, Republic of Hawaii
- Resting place: Honolulu Catholic Cemetery
- Spouse(s): Joanna Niaukololani Drew Ladd; Helen Nina Ladd
- Children: William Ladd, Mahealani, Rose
- Education: ʻĀhuimanu College; Royal School
- Occupation: Lawyer, Politician, Judge

Antone Rosa (November 10, 1855 – September 9, 1898) was a politician, lawyer and judge of the Kingdom of Hawaii and Republic of Hawaii. He served as Attorney General of Hawaii, and as a private secretary and vice chamberlain to King Kalākaua.

== Early life ==
He was born at Kalae, on the island of Molokai, on November 10, 1855. His mother was a Native Hawaiian while his father Antone Rosa Sr. (1825–1896) was a fisherman of Portuguese descent. The senior Rosa immigrated to the Hawaiian Islands from Portugal in 1850. He had five sons: Antone Jr., Manuel, Joseph, Levi and George. However, the younger Rosa rarely referred to himself as "Jr." Educated at the Roman Catholic College of ʻĀhuimanu and later Honolulu's Royal School under Anglican Rev. Alexander Mackintosh, Rosa became fluent in English, Hawaiian and French.

== Career ==
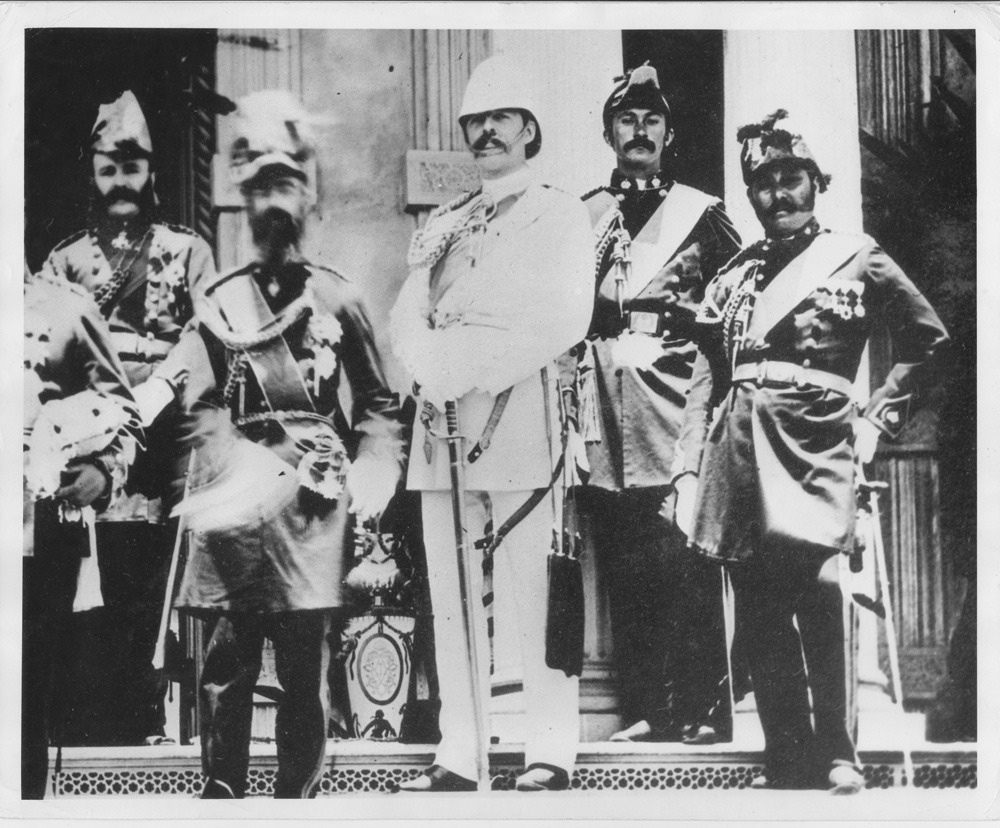
Rosa (far right) with other members of King Kalākaua's staff, 1882

He clerked for Chief Justice Charles Coffin Harris, and served as Deputy Clerk of the Supreme Court October 25, 1877, to September 3, 1882, but he was not allowed to practice as an attorney, because he had never studied law. After taking a two-year career sabbatical to study law, he passed his exam on October 27, 1884, and was admitted to the Bar. He was serving as Deputy Attorney-General in 1885 when King Kalākaua appointed him Attorney-General on November 15 to fill a vacancy caused by the departure of John Lot Kaulukou. He held that position until June 1887.

Rosa's name was placed in nomination as an Independent candidate for representative from Honolulu in 1887. The Kaumakapili Church hosted numerous meetings for Hawaiians to hear candidate positions on the issues of the day. At Rosa's appearances, he spoke in the Hawaiian language and expressed support for the new Bayonet Constitution, but disdained how Kalākaua had been forced into signing it. He denounced both the Honolulu Rifles and the Reform Party of Hawaii for their actions in obtaining that constitution, and for what he purported were later illegal exchanges of money after the document became the law of the Kingdom. He was defeated by the Reform Party candidate at the September 12 election.

In October 1887, Kalākaua appointed him as his private secretary and Vice Chamberlain of the Royal Household, where he held the rank of Major. Due to a temporary absence of Curtis P. Iaukea and John Owen Dominis during that same period, Rosa was assigned the temporary reins of their positions: Acting Commander-in-Chief of the Forces of the Kingdom (Dominis), Acting Adjutant General of the Forces of the Kingdom (Iaukea) and Acting Governor of Oahu (Iaukea).

During the February 1890 general election, Rosa ran unopposed on the National Reform candidate for Representative of Oahu winning a seat in the legislative assembly. During this session, Rosa and his fellow legislators ousted the Reform cabinet led by Lorrin A. Thurston.

When Kalākaua died January 31, 1891, a series of gatherings at the Kaumakapili Church were held to deal with "the nation's calamity". The Kalākaua Monument Association was formed to raise funds for a memorial. Samuel Parker was elected as its president, and the membership included high-profile names of the day. Trustees were Rosa, John F. Colburn and E. C. Marfalane. Rosa was appointed in March by Queen Liliuokalani to her Privy Council of State. During the political crisis prior to the overthrow of the Kingdom of Hawaii, Rosa supported the queen. He and other royalist leaders met at ʻIolani Palace and addressed the crowds of people gather there, on January 16, 1893. They formed the Committee of Law and Order, a counter to the Committee of Safety which led to the deposition of the Hawaiian monarchy the next day.

Judge S. L. Austin of the Third and Fourth Circuit courts died suddenly in 1896, and Rosa was appointed as his replacement under the Republic of Hawaii. He eventually resigned the judgeship and returned to private practice.

Rosa died on September 9, 1898, at his residence in Pawaa, Honolulu, after a lengthy illness. The funeral was held on the same day at the Cathedral Basilica of Our Lady of Peace officiated by Bishop Gulstan Ropert, and he was buried at the Honolulu Catholic Cemetery.

== Personal life ==
Rosa was married twice. His first marriage, on January 1, 1883, was to Joanna Niaukololani Drew Ladd (1847–1891), daughter of Mr. Drew and Abigail Kamaio Elwell, who was also of part-Hawaiian descent. She was the widow of William Newton Ladd, by whom she had three daughters: Helen, Mabel and Emily. She notably received two hundred dollars as a minor devisee in the will of Bernice Pauahi Bishop. Joanna died on August 19, 1891. After Joanna's death and much to the surprise of his friends, Rosa remarried on December 12, 1891, to his stepdaughter Helen Nina Ladd (1865–1931). The Ladd family were the founders of Ladd & Co. sugarcane business, and later land speculators. Helen and their three children William Ladd Rosa, Mahealani A. Rosa and Rose Rosa survived him.

He and his friend, former Minister of Interior John F. Colburn, were arrested in March 1898 for driving their carriage into a fish market, claiming they were trying to get the open-topped vehicle out of the rain. Rosa's and Colburn's defense was that it was not against the law, which was confirmed by their release.

Rosa left an estate estimated at $8,000, most of it in land holdings, with Colburn named as the executor of his will. The court ordered that Rosa's widow be paid $10 a week from the estate.
