= Paul Nahaolelua =

Hawaiian high chief (1806–1875)

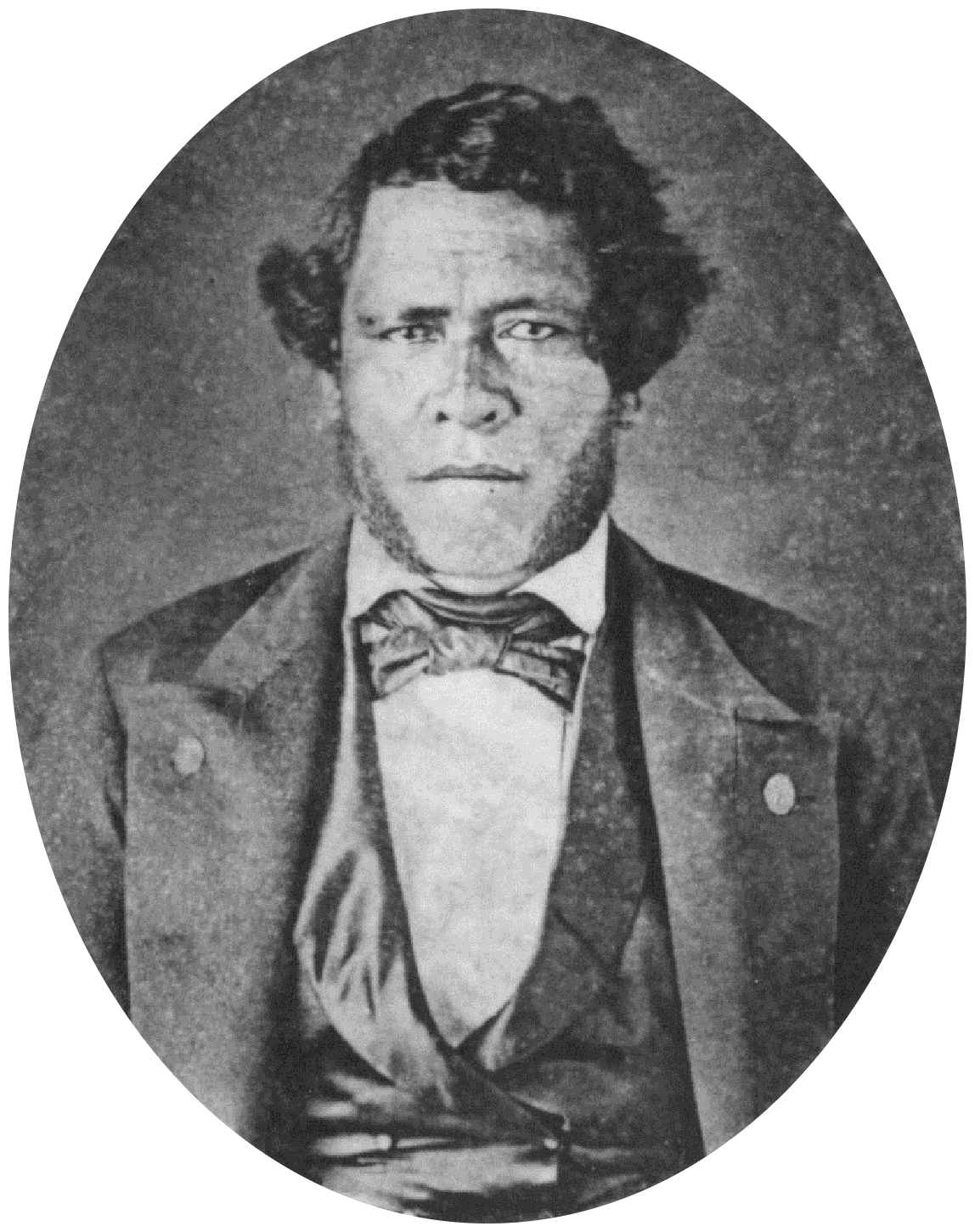

Governor of Maui
- In office December 3, 1852 – February 3, 1874
- Preceded by: James Kānehoa Young
- Succeeded by: John Mākini Kapena

President of the Legislative Assembly
- In office 1870, 1872, 1873, 1874
- Preceded by: Mataio Kekūanaōʻa
- Succeeded by: Charles Reed Bishop

Minister of Finance
- In office February 17, 1874 – October 31, 1874
- Preceded by: Robert Stirling
- Succeeded by: John Smith Walker

Personal details
- Born: September 11, 1806 Kawaihae, Hawaii, Kingdom of Hawaii
- Died: September 5/15, 1875 (aged 68–69) Lahaina, Maui, Kingdom of Hawaii
- Resting place: Hale Aloha Cemetery, Lahaina
- Spouse: Helekunihi
- Children: 2 (1 hānai)
- Education: Lahainaluna Seminary

Paul Nahaolelua (September 11, 1806 – September 5/15, 1875) was a Hawaiian high chief who served many political posts in the Kingdom of Hawaii, including Governor of Maui from 1852 to 1874. In his long political career, Nahaolelua served under the reigns of five monarchs: Kamehameha III, Kamehameha IV and Kamehameha V, Lunalilo and Kalākaua.

== Early life ==
Nahaolelua was born on September 11, 1806, in Kawaihae, in the district of Kohala, on the island of Hawaii. He was given the name Nahaolelua meaning "the two haole" ("foreigners") in honor of John Young and Isaac Davis, the two foreign advisors to King Kamehameha I during his conquest of the Kingdom of Hawaii.

He started his career as a schoolmaster teaching Hawaiian at the royal school in Kaupo, Maui. He later became one of the first generation of Hawaiians to receive a western education at the Lahainaluna Seminary from the Christian missionaries who arrived in Hawaii in 1820.

== Political career ==
Nahaolelua began working for the government as a district magistrate and circuit judge on Maui. He also served as royal postmaster. During the governorship of James Kānehoa Young, Nahaolelua served as deputy governor of Maui. Shortly after Kānehoa's death in 1851, he succeeded as Governor of Maui, although the position was not officially confirmed until the following year on December 3, 1852. He served as Governor for twenty-two years until 1874.

As a royal governor, he also held a seat in the House of Nobles, the upper house of the legislature, traditionally reserved for the high chiefs. He sat during most of the legislative sessions between 1853 and 1874. He served as a member of the Privy Council of the King. He was elected the President of the Legislative Assembly during the sessions of 1870, 1872, and the special sessions of 1873 and 1874. During the reign of Kamehameha V, he was made a Knight Commander of the Royal Order of Kamehameha I.

=== Issue of succession, 1872–1874 ===
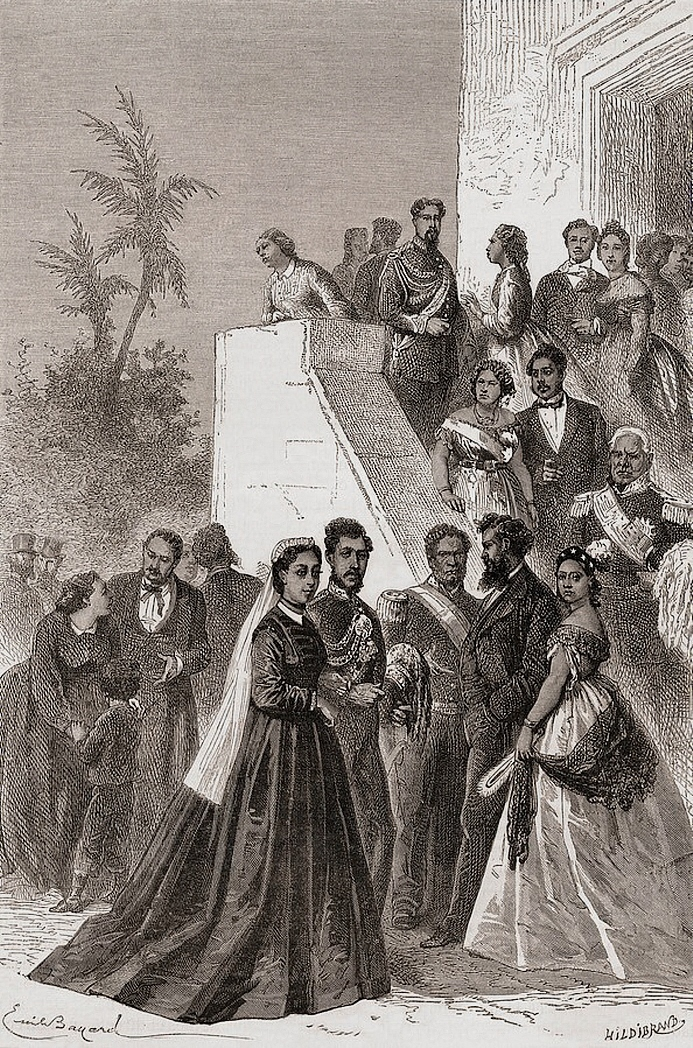
Governor Nahaolelua (center, right) socializing with other members of the royal court during the reign of Kamehameha V.

In 1872, Nahaolelua was present at the deathbed of King Kamehameha V. Kneeling at the side of bed, with many of the members of the royal court present, he spoke with the monarch in his last attempts to name a successor to the throne. Kamehameha V, who regarded him as a close friend and business associate, asked Nahaolelua to choose an heir for him. He refused and answered, "Any one, may it please Your Majesty, of the chiefs now present." The King attempted to name his cousin Bernice Pauahi Bishop but she refused the offer, and he died the same day without naming a successor.

Because Kamehameha V died with no heir, the constitution called for the legislature, which Nahaolelua presided over as President of the Legislative Assembly, to select the next monarch. By both popular vote, and the unanimous vote in the legislature, Lunalilo became the first elected king of Hawaii in 1873. In private, Nahaolelua tried to persuade the new king to name a successor so the kingdom would not face another succession crisis. However, after a short reign, Lunalilo died in 1874 without an heir to succeed to him. In the election that followed, David Kalākaua, ran against Queen Emma, the widow of Kamehameha IV.

On February 12, 1874, for the second time in Hawaiian history, a special session of the legislature was called to elect a new monarch, and Nahaolelua was chosen again as the President of the Legislative Assembly. The assembly voted thirty-nine to six in favor of Kalākaua. The subsequent announcement caused a riot at the courthouse as Emmaite supporters attacked and beat the native legislators who had voted for Kalākaua. American and British troops were landed, and the rioters were arrested. Nahaolelua, a known supporter and friend of Queen Emma, had left the courthouse before the riot, to bring her the news of her defeat. She reportedly sent him back with the message: "If they could not obtain their desires now, perhaps they had better wait until the morrow, when a new election for Sovereign could be had." The next day Queen Emma asked Nahaolelua about the possibility of holding a second election which he refused.

== Later life and death ==
After the accession of Kalākaua, Nahaolelua resigned the Governorship of Maui and was appointed to the new monarch's cabinet as Minister of Finance on February 17, 1874. However, due to failing health, he resigned the post on October 31, 1874, and returned to his residence in Lahaina, on the island of Maui.

After being ill for a few months Nahaolelua died on September 5 or 15, 1875, at his residence in Lahaina at the age of sixty-nine. Forgoing a lavish state funeral traditionally given to a person of his rank, his funeral was held the same day as his death, and he was buried in a plain pine coffin in a prepared vault at the Anglican Hale Aloha Cemetery in Lahaina.

== Marriage and descendants ==
Nahaolelua married Helekunihi (died 1888) and had one son Obid (sometimes spelled Obed), who died shortly after birth on March 20, 1858. A second child, who also died young, is mentioned in Nahaolelua's obituary but not named. Under the Hawaiian tradition of hānai, they adopted Edward George Huakini (better known simply as "Kia"), the son of Helekunihi's brother Aki and Kaʻaiohelo. Kia Nahaolelua (1852–1901) became the sole heir of Governor Nahaolelua's estate after his death. Kia married Elizabeth Kahele Manawaola St. John (1852–1909), who served as lady-in-waiting to Queen Liliuokalani and accompanied her to Washington, DC during her 1897 trip to protest American annexation of Hawaii. They had nine children many of whose descendants are alive to this day.

== Honours ==
- Knight Commander of the Royal Order of Kamehameha I.

== Bibliography ==
- Dabagh, Jean, ed. (1974). "A King is Elected: One Hundred Years Ago". The Hawaiian Journal of History. 8. Honolulu: Hawaiian Historical Society: 76–89. hdl:10524/112. OCLC 60626541.
- Hawaii (1918). Lydecker, Robert Colfax (ed.). Roster Legislatures of Hawaii, 1841–1918. Honolulu: Hawaiian Gazette Company. OCLC 60737418.
- Kanahele, George S. (1999). Emma: Hawaii's Remarkable Queen. Honolulu: University of Hawaii Press. ISBN 978-0-8248-2240-8. OCLC 40890919.
- Kanahele, George S. (2002) [1986]. Pauahi: The Kamehameha Legacy. Honolulu: Kamehameha Schools Press. ISBN 978-0-87336-005-0. OCLC 173653971.
- Kuykendall, Ralph Simpson (1953). The Hawaiian Kingdom 1854–1874, Twenty Critical Years. Vol. 2. Honolulu: University of Hawaii Press. ISBN 978-0-87022-432-4. OCLC 47010821.
- Kuykendall, Ralph Simpson (1967). The Hawaiian Kingdom 1874–1893, The Kalakaua Dynasty. Vol. 3. Honolulu: University of Hawaii Press. ISBN 978-0-87022-433-1. OCLC 500374815.
- Liliuokalani (1898). Hawaii's Story by Hawaii's Queen, Liliuokalani. Boston: Lee and Shepard. ISBN 978-0-548-22265-2. OCLC 2387226.
- Osorio, Jon Kamakawiwoʻole (2002). Dismembering Lāhui: A History of the Hawaiian Nation to 1887. Honolulu: University of Hawaii Press. ISBN 0-8248-2549-7. OCLC 48579247.
