= John Lot Kaulukoʻu =

Hawaiian attorney general

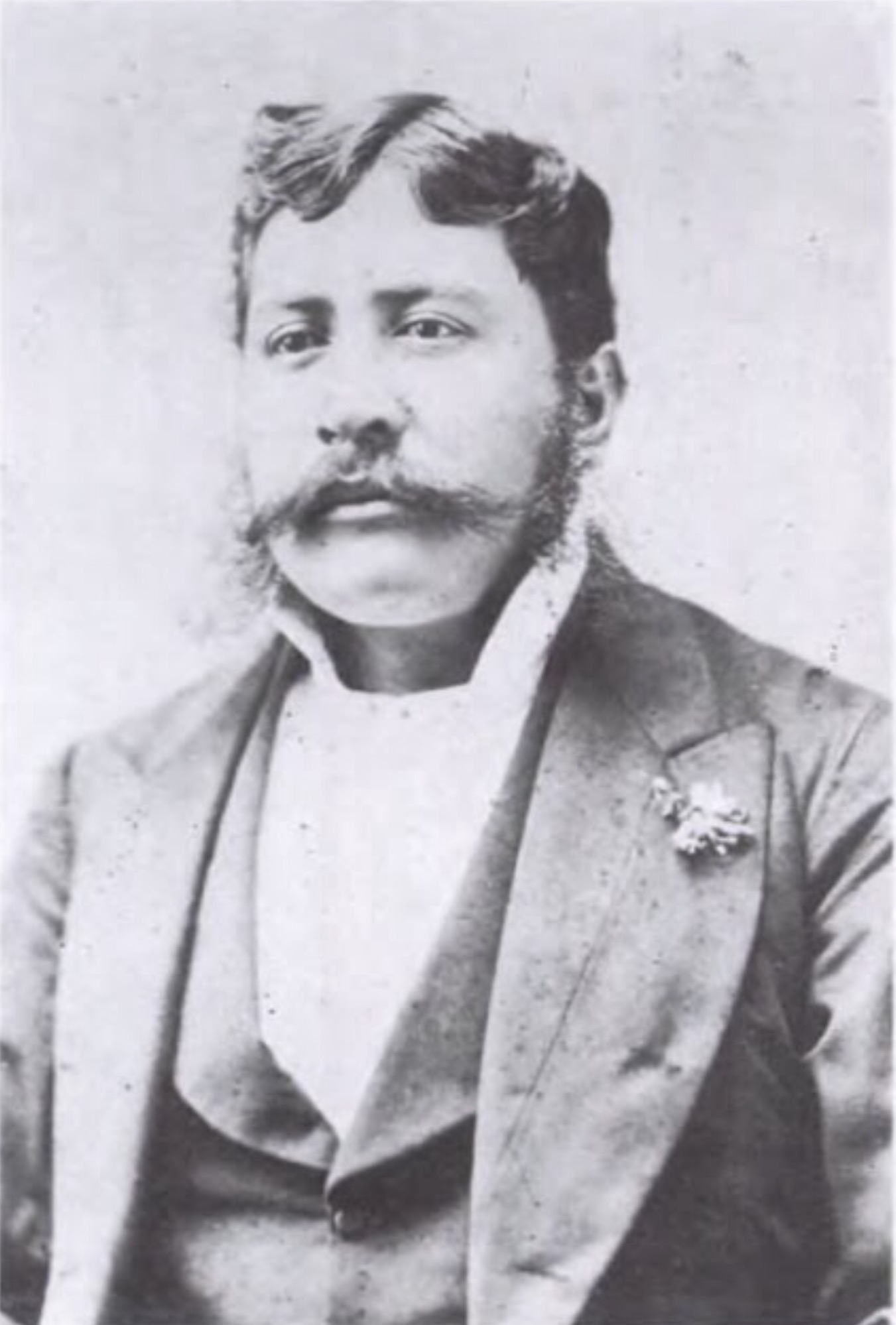

Kingdom of Hawaii Attorney General
- In office October 13, 1886 – October 23, 1886
- Monarch: Kalākaua
- Preceded by: John T. Dare
- Succeeded by: Antone Rosa

Personal details
- Born: June 1, 1841 Keauhou, Hawaii
- Died: June 2, 1917 (aged 76)

John Lot Kaulukoʻu (June 1, 1841 – June 2, 1917) was Attorney General of the Kingdom of Hawaii under the monarchy of Kalākaua.

== Early life ==
Kaulukoʻu was born of Spanish and Hawaiian ancestry, in Keauhou, Hawaii. Orphaned at a young age, his grandfather enrolled him at Lahainaluna on Maui. At that time, the institution was a Protestant missionary school, where he spent several years under the direction of Christian ministers John Fawcett Pogue and Sereno E. Bishop. Upon his 1869 graduation, he taught school for several years in Kona.

== Legal career ==
He decided to pursue a legal career in 1873, taking on odd jobs in Honolulu, while studying under Charles Coffin Harris, who had served in cabinets of both Kamehameha IV and Kamehameha V. He also studied under Albert Francis Judd, Attorney General under Kamehameha V. Both of his legal mentors would be appointed to individual terms as Chief Justices of the Supreme Court of Hawaii by Kalākaua. In 1877, Kaulukoʻu was appointed district magistrate of Koolaupoko.

Kaulukoʻu successfully ran for office to the House of Representatives of the Legislature of the Kingdom of Hawaii in 1880, being re-elected in 1882 and 1884. In 1882, Kalākaua appointed him secretary to John Mākini Kapena, to participate in contract labor negotiations with Japan. In 1884, he was elected sheriff of Hawaii County. He had a short-lived political appointment as Postmaster General, prior to the king appointing him as Attorney General in 1886. After Antone Rosa was appointed Attorney General a short time later, Kaulukoʻu went into private law practice. After the overthrow of the monarchy, he became an executive member of Hui Aloha ʻĀina (Hawaiian Patriotic League), a patriotic group founded to protest the attempt of Hawaiian annexation to the United States, and represented the case of the monarchy and the Hawaiian people to the United States Commissioner James H. Blount who was sent by President Grover Cleveland to investigate the overthrow. Later, Kaulukoʻu switched his stance against the overthrow and was elected to the House of Representatives of the Republic of Hawaii, and served as the Speaker for the legislative session February 16 – July 7, 1898.

== Personal life ==
He married a woman named Susie in 1870, and they had six children. His three daughters were un-named at the time of his death. His three sons were John Lot Kaulukoʻu, Jr., Kauai county treasurer Abraham Gilbert Kaulukoʻu, and Lot Kalani Kaulukoʻu who had an international career as a dancer under the stage name Lot Sebastian. Kaulukoʻu died June 2, 1917, after a lengthy period battling the complications of diabetes.

== Bibliography ==
- Blount, James Henderson (1895). The Executive Documents of the House of Representatives for the Third Session of the Fifty-Third Congress, 1893–'94 in Thirty-Five Volumes. Washington, DC: U.S. Government Printing Office. OCLC 191710879.
- Lydecker, Robert Colfax, ed. (1918). Roster Legislatures of Hawaii, 1841–1918. Honolulu: Hawaiian Gazette Company. OCLC 60737418.
