= Simon Kaloa Kaʻai =

Hawaiian politician (??–1884)

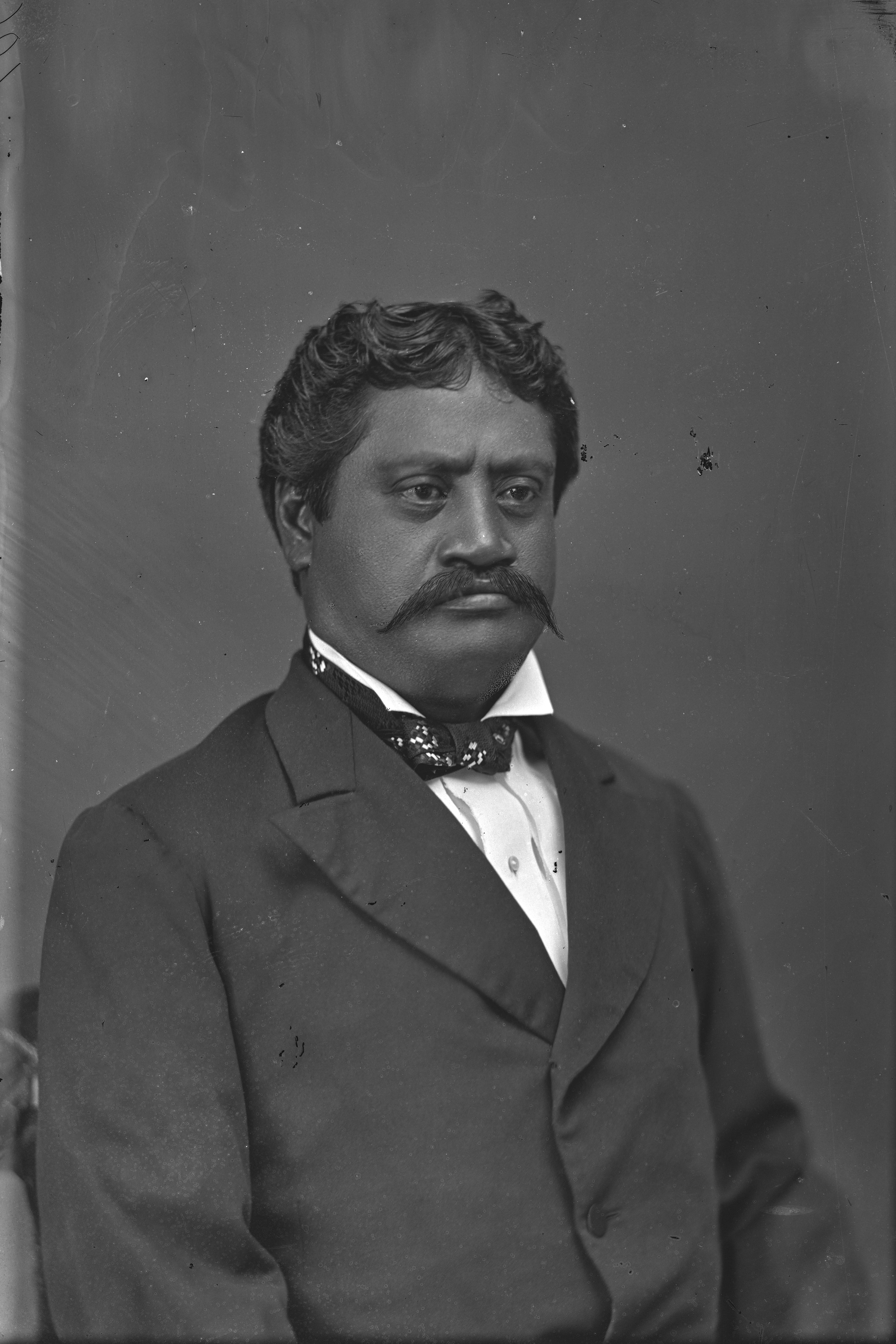

Vice President of the Legislative Assembly
- In office February 12, 1874 – August 8, 1874
- Preceded by: David Howard Hitchcock, Sr.
- Succeeded by: Luther Aholo

Kingdom of Hawaii Minister of Finance
- In office July 3, 1878 – August 14, 1880
- Preceded by: John Mākini Kapena
- Succeeded by: Moses Kuaea
- In office August 8, 1882 – February 13, 1883
- Preceded by: John E. Bush
- Succeeded by: John Mākini Kapena

Kingdom of Hawaii Minister of the Interior
- In office May 20, 1882 – August 8, 1882
- Preceded by: Henry A. P. Carter
- Succeeded by: John E. Bush

Personal details
- Died: March 22, 1884 Honolulu, Oahu, Kingdom of Hawaii
- Resting place: Kawaiahaʻo Church
- Spouse(s): first wife Becky Kekoa Kaʻai
- Children: Ernest Kaʻai

Simon Kaloa Kaʻai (died March 22, 1884) was a politician who served many political posts in the Kingdom of Hawaii. He served multiple terms as a legislator from the island of Hawaii, Minister of Finance from 1878 to 1880 and from 1882 to 1883 and Minister of the Interior in 1882.

== Life and career ==
He was born at Keopu, Kailua, North Kona, on the island of Hawaii, the son of Kaʻai (died 1859) and Kaupena. His father was from Waikapu, on the island of Maui, and served as a servant at Pohukaina to Prince Lunalilo, who would reign as king from 1873 to 1874. His paternal uncle was named Methuselah Mahuka (died 1881). The younger Kaʻai was educated at schools in Wailuku. He served as turnkey or under-jailer for Oahu Prison before moving back to Hawaii Island where he served as deputy sheriff of Kona in the late 1860s. He was given many political appointments including marriage license agent for Hawaii on July 8, 1869, tax assessor for Waialua, Oahu on June 19, 1877, and a member of the Board of Health on July 3, 1878. He also served as an agent of the estate of Princess Ruth Keʻelikōlani.

Kaʻai began his legislative career as a member of the House of Representatives, the lower house of the legislature of the kingdom, for the district of South Kona. He sat as a representative during the legislative assemblies from 1870 to 1874. During the special session and regular session of 1874, he presided as Vice President of the Legislative Assembly. After the accession of King Kalākaua to the Hawaiian throne, Kaʻai switched his former loyalty from the defeated Queen Emma and became a supporter of the new monarch. Kalākaua appointed him to the House of Nobles, the upper house of the legislature, on January 11, 1876, and as a member of his Privy Council of State on December 10, 1877. Kaʻai would serve as either a noble or cabinet minister (Note: Appointed cabinet ministers had the right to participate as ex-officio members of the legislature, as nobles.) from 1876 to his death in 1884.

Kaʻai was a leading figure of a new generation of Hawaiian leaders, along with Prince Leleiohoku II (the brother of the king) and John Mākini Kapena. The king appointed him to succeed Kapena as Minister of Finance from July 3, 1878 to August 14, 1880. From May 20, 1882 to August 8, 1882, he served as Minister of the Interior. He was appointed as Minister of Finance for a second term from August 8, 1882 to February 13, 1883. An avid supporter of the absolute power of the king, Kaʻai once stated at a public meeting in 1880 after his first dismissal from the cabinet that "the King has the absolute right to make and unmake cabinets, and that no one has the right to object or criticize no matter what he does or how he does it." Historian Ralph Simpson Kuykendall notes, "This statement is of great interest, for it contains the very essence of one side of the constitutional controversy that raged in Hawaii for the next dozen years." Kaʻai was dismissed from his second term as minister on February 13, 1883. The reason cited was for "dereliction of ministerial duty" with American ambassador Rollin M. Daggett writing, he was dismissed "because of his notorious and persistent intemperance." Kapena was appointed Minister of Finance in his place.

== Death ==
Kaʻai died from a "paralysis of the brain", (Note: Later sources claimed Kaʻai "drank himself to death".) at his residence in Kapālama, on March 22, 1884. His funeral the following day was officiated by Reverend Henry Hodges Parker while many members of the government paid their respect to his passing. He was interred beside his first wife in the cemetery of Kawaiahaʻo Church. He left a widow Becky Kekoa Kaʻai (1863?–1903), his second wife, and a surviving son Ernest Kaʻai who became a renowned musician and "Hawaii's Greatest Ukulele Player".
