= Reciprocity Treaty of 1875 =

Treaty between the United States and Hawaii

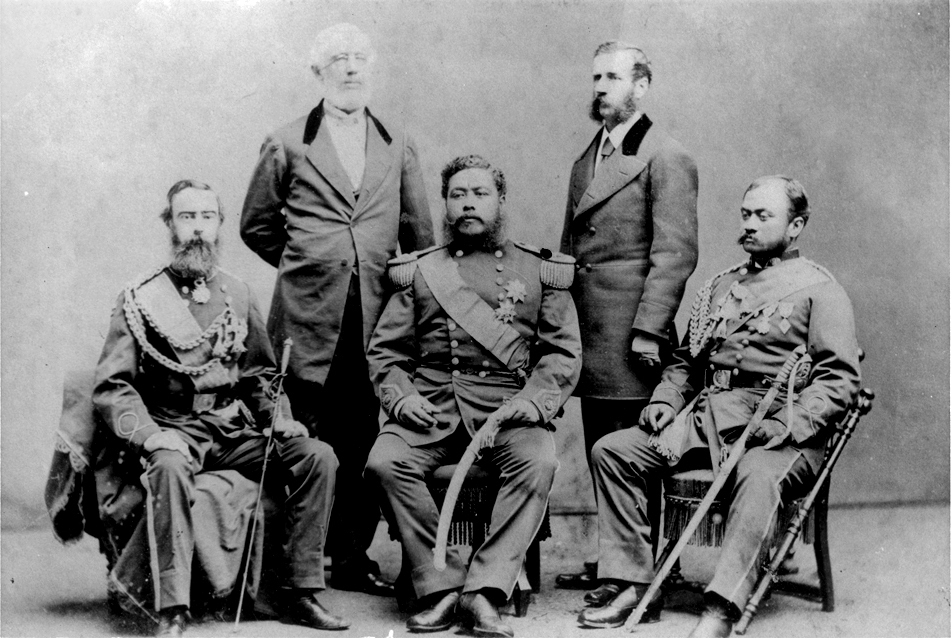
King Kalākaua and members of the Reciprocity Commission: John Owen Dominis, Governor of Oahu; Henry A. Peirce, the presiding U.S. Commissioner to Hawaii; King Kalākaua; Henry W. Severance, the Hawaiian Consul in San Francisco, and John M. Kapena, Governor of Maui.

The Treaty of Reciprocity between the United States of America and the Hawaiian Kingdom (Hawaiian: Kuʻikahi Pānaʻi Like) was a free trade agreement signed and ratified in 1875 that is generally known as the Reciprocity Treaty of 1875.

The treaty gave free access to the United States market for sugar and other products grown in the Kingdom of Hawaii starting in September 1876. In return, the US received a guarantee that Hawaii would not cede or lease any of its lands to other foreign powers. The treaty led to large investment by Americans in sugarcane plantations in Hawaii.

In a later extension of the treaty, the United States negotiated for exclusive use of lands in the area known as Puʻu Loa, which were later used for the Pearl Harbor naval base.

== Background ==
For decades, the sugar planters in Hawaii had been economically hampered by United States import taxes placed upon their product, and consequently had been attempting negotiations for a free trade agreement. Two previous efforts at reaching an agreement with the United States failed, for many reasons. The planters wanted a treaty, but Hawaiians feared it would lead to annexation by the United States. Sugar refineries in San Francisco lobbied for a clause protecting their interests. The most recent effort before Kalākaua's reign died in the United States Senate.

Within a year of Kalākaua's election, the treaty would become a reality, although the treaty was not supported by all Hawaiians. There were concerns over American ambitions to annex the islands, with many in the business community willing to cede the exclusive use of Pearl Harbor to the United States in exchange for the treaty. Part of Kalākaua's election platform, as "Hawaii for Hawaiians", had been to oppose the ceding of any sovereign land. Hawaii legislator Joseph Nāwahī predicted the treaty would be "a nation snatching treaty".

== Negotiations ==
"The Reason why Senator Booth voted against the Hawaiian Sugar Treaty," a political cartoon published in The Wasp mocking senator Newton Booth for voting against the treaty, October 14, 1876

At the urging of Hawaii's businessmen and the kingdom's newspapers, Kalākaua agreed to travel to the United States at the head of a Reciprocity Commission consisting of sugar planter Henry A. P. Carter of C. Brewer & Co., Hawaii Chief Justice Elisha Hunt Allen, and Minister of Foreign Affairs William Lowthian Green. After several months of negotiations, the treaty was signed on January 30, 1875, ratified by the Kingdom of Hawaii April 17, and ratified by the United States on May 31, without giving away any Hawaiian land. For the US, signers were Secretary of State Hamilton Fish and president Ulysses S. Grant. It allowed certain Hawaiian goods, mainly sugar and rice, to be admitted into the United States tax-free, for a period of 7 years. In return, Hawaii agreed not to levy import taxes on American-produced goods coming into Hawaii. The first shipment of sugar from Hawaii to the United States under the treaty arrived in San Francisco in September 1876 in a ship commanded by Captain William H. Marston.

== Extension ==
In the United States, the complaints about the treaty had been from southern sugar plantation owners who charged that the treaty favored Hawaiian planters, and sugar refiners who believed San Francisco refiners, in particular, that of Claus Spreckels, were given an unfair advantage. In Hawaii, the government became concerned that the subsequent United States Tariff Act of March 3, 1883, which lowered sugar tariffs imposed on product imported from all nations, had left them at a disadvantage. Article IV of the reciprocity treaty prevented Hawaii from making reciprocity treaties with other nations. President Chester A. Arthur was in favor of modifying the existing treaty. At the expiration of the treaty's 7 years, it remained in effect on a year-to-year basis. In 1884, Henry A. P. Carter and United States Secretary of State Frederick Theodore Frelinghuysen sent a proposal to the United States Senate. After several months of negotiations, an agreement was reached on December 6, 1884, but it would be another 2 years and 11 months before ratification by both parties. Article II of the extension gave exclusive use of Pearl Harbor to the United States. Treaty ratifications were exchanged on December 9, 1887, extending the agreement for an additional 7 years.

== Impact ==
The most immediate result of the treaty was the boom in new sugar plantations. San Francisco sugar refiner Claus Spreckels became a major investor in Hawaii's sugar industry, initially buying half of the first year's production, and ultimately being the major shareholder in the plantations. Claus and his son John D. Spreckels became part owners of the Waihee plantation on the island of Maui. Within 5 years, it was estimated that he owned one-third of the sugar production in Hawaii. By 1882, the year he exported 24 million tons of raw sugar from the islands, he claimed to have a monopoly on the Hawaiian sugar production. Spreckels became one of Kalākaua's close associates, and by extension, tied in with the king's cabinet minister Walter Murray Gibson.

Over the term of Kalākaua's reign, the treaty had a major effect on the kingdom's income. In 1874, Hawaii exported $1,839,620.27 in products. The value of exported products for 1890, the last full year of his reign, was $13,282,729.48, an increase of 722%. The exportation of sugar during that time period went from 24,566,611 pounds to 330,822,879 pounds.

== See also ==
- Hawaiian Kingdom—United States relations
- Honolulu Courthouse Riot
- Early History of Pearl Harbor
- Entry into force
- List of bilateral treaties signed by the Kingdom of Hawaii
- Overthrow of the Hawaiian Kingdom
- Reciprocity (international relations)
