= Richard H. Stanley =

American politician

Richard Henry Stanley (September 10, 1825 – November 5, 1875) was an American lawyer who served as politician and cabinet member of the Kingdom of Hawaii.

== Life ==
Stanley was born in New York City, September 10, 1825, son of Joseph Currey Stanley and Ellen (Cortelyou) Stanley. He arrived in Hawaii on the ship "Yankee" on 20 April 1858. On February 4, 1861, he became a citizen of the Kingdom of Hawaii. In 1869, he was hired with R. G. Davis by Henry E. Pierce to argue that he was legally the son of American diplomat Henry A. Peirce. He was involved in several land claims, and became commissioner of crown lands in 1874. In the 1874 sessions he was in the legislature of the Hawaiian Kingdom in the House of Nobles. This was a special session to elect a new king after the death of Lunalilo after a reign of only one year. Stanley acted of secretary of this meeting in February 1874.

He was appointed Attorney General on May 28, 1874, by King Kalākaua, and replaced Alfred S. Hartwell.

He died November 5, 1875. John S. Walker who was minister of finance, acted as attorney general until William Richards Castle was appointed on February 15, 1876. One of his law partners, Edward Preston (1831–1890), would also later become attorney general.

Government offices
Preceded by Alfred S. Hartwell	Kingdom of Hawaii Attorney General; May 1874 – November 1875	Succeeded by John S. Walker
