= John E. Bush (Hawaii politician) =

Hawaiian politician and publisher (1842–1906)

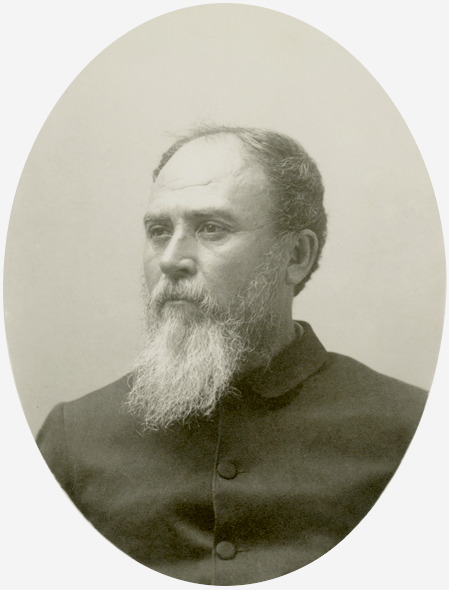

Royal Governor of Kauaʻi
- In office January 4, 1877 – 1880
- Preceded by: Paul Kanoa
- Succeeded by: Frederick W. Beckley

Minister of the Interior
- In office August 14, 1880 – September 27
- Preceded by: Samuel Gardner Wilder
- Succeeded by: Henry A. P. Carter

Minister of Finance
- In office May 20, 1882 – August 8

Minister of the Interior
- In office August 8, 1882 – July 26, 1883
- Preceded by: Simon Kaloa Kaai
- Succeeded by: Walter Murray Gibson

Personal details
- Born: February 15, 1842 Honolulu, Oʻahu
- Died: June 28, 1906 (aged 64) Honolulu, Oʻahu
- Party: Liberal
- Other political affiliations: Democrat

John Edward Bush (February 15, 1842 – June 28, 1906), also known as John Edwin Bush, was a politician and newspaper publisher in the Kingdom of Hawaii.

== Early life ==
John E. Bush was born in Honolulu on February 15, 1842. He was the son of George Henry Bush (1807–1853), a native of Suffolk, who came to Hawaii from England in 1825, and his Hawaiian wife. Thus he was of mixed native Hawaiian and Caucasian descent (known as hapa haole). Growing up in a multicultural environment, he could read, write, and speak at least the English and Hawaiian language fluently. He sometimes used ʻAiluene Buki as the Hawaiian version of his name. He worked for a while on a whaling ship, and then learned the printing trade at the offices of the Hawaiian Gazette. His younger brother James Wood Bush was a sailor in the Union Navy and veteran of the American Civil War.

== Politics ==
In 1875, he became a marriage license agent, and 1876 a land appraiser on Oʻahu island. On January 4, 1877, King Kalākaua appointed him Royal Governor of the island of Kauaʻi. Kalākaua also appointed him to his Privy Council on September 1, 1878, and the House of Nobles in the legislature of the Hawaiian Kingdom on April 24, 1880. Bush served until the office was made elective in 1887.

On August 14, 1880, he became Minister of the Interior in Kalākaua's cabinet, but he was replaced about six weeks later on September 27. He temporarily acted as Minister of Foreign Affairs replacing Celso Caesar Moreno for much of the same time as well, until William Lowthian Green took the office on a more permanent basis. He was back in the cabinet again on May 20, 1882, as Minister of Finance, but served only until August 8 of that year. At that time he took the interior ministry again, and served until July 26, 1883. After another temporary replacement, Charles T. Gulick became interior minister. Bush was accused of "irregularities" in awarding public works contracts.

=== Polynesian Confederation ===
On December 23, 1886, Kalākaua named him a special envoy to Samoa in an attempt to form a Polynesian alliance with Samoan King Malietoa Laupepa. Bush arrived to Apia, Laupepa's capital, on January 7, 1887, on the steamer Zealandia. Laupepa was awarded the honorary decoration Grand Cross of the Royal Order of the Star of Oceania. The order had just been created for the heads of state for the proposed Polynesian confederation, although the actual medal was delayed in the mail. Bush lavishly entertained the Samoans and promised more gifts, such as a carriage and pair of horses. By February 17, Laupepa agreed to the alliance, and a treaty forming a Polynesian Confederation was signed on March 21, 1887.

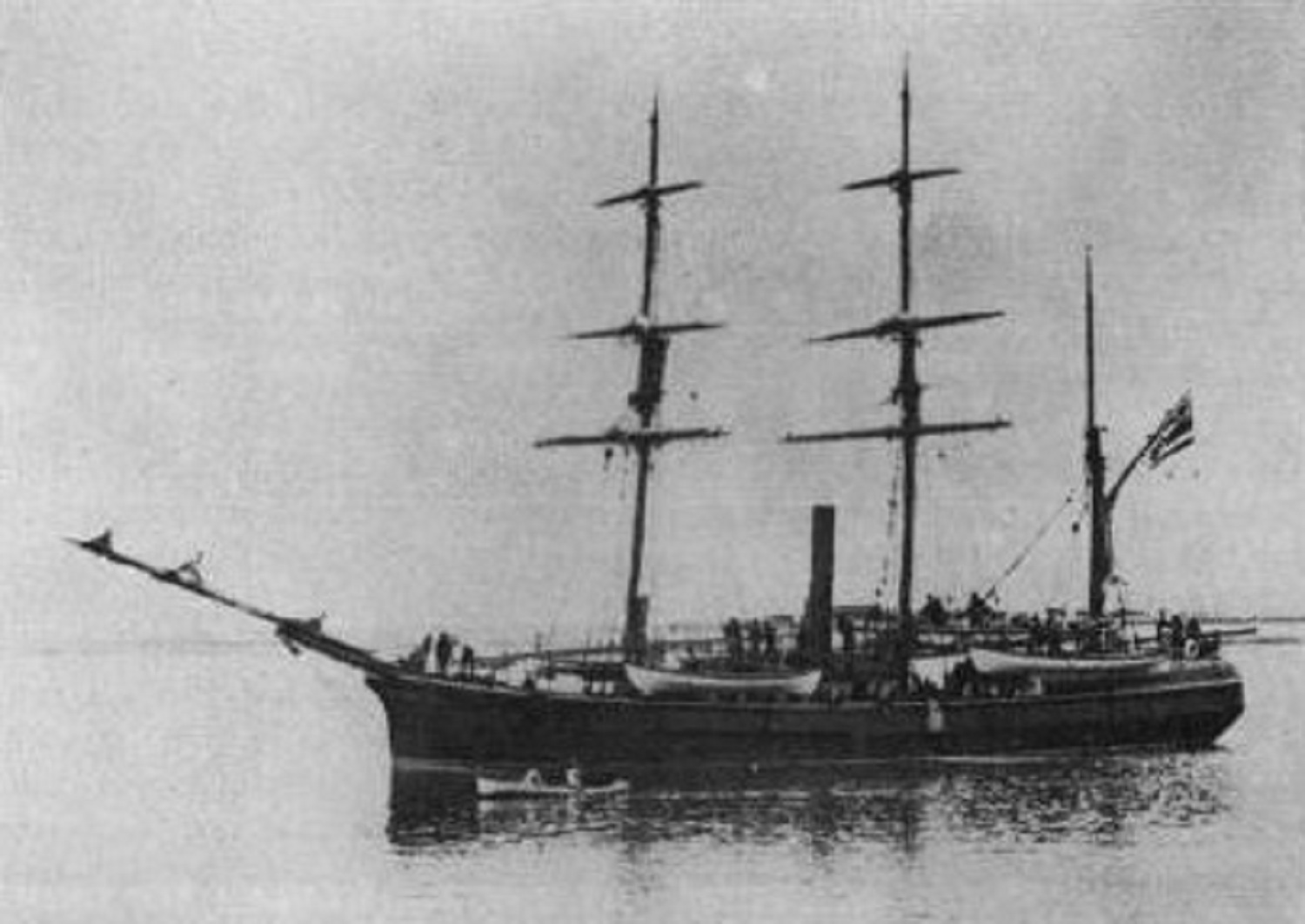
The Kaimiloa at Honoluly Harbor.

Bush then was told to negotiate similar deals with Tonga, the Gilbert Islands, and others in the Pacific. The empire was generally thought to be the idea of Walter M. Gibson, who among his other titles, had himself named secretary of the Navy. However, the "navy" did not have any ships. On January 22, 1887, Gibson convinced the government to purchase the Explorer, a 128-foot (39 m) former British merchant steamer which had been launched in 1872. After being refitted at great expense (over budget and behind schedule), the ship was renamed Kaimiloa (from ka ʻimi loa which roughly means "the explorer" in the Hawaiian language), and ceremonially launched on April 20, 1887. Isobel Strong, the stepdaughter of Robert Louis Stevenson and wife of Joseph Dwight Strong, designed a naval flag, and Henri Berger composed a march in her honor. Kaimiloa finally set sail on May 18, 1887, to serve as Bush's flagship.

Henry A. P. Carter, who was in Europe trying to negotiate treaties between Hawaiian and major powers at the time, informed the German Empire of the agreement. Germany had been asserting influence over the Samoan islands, which were in the midst of a Samoan Civil War. Germany, with its powerful modern navy, considered the ship an irritating insult. Kaimiloa was commanded by George E. Gresley Jackson, master of the Honolulu Reformatory School, and manned by members of the school's band. The mission was documented with J. D. Strong as ship's artist and photographer. She had been refitted with cannon and Gattling guns, although her arms were barely usable for anything but ceremonial salutes. The ship got lost but finally made it to Apia in mid-June 1887. The crew exchanged salutes with the German ship Adler, which shadowed Kaimiloa while Bush tried to gather support for Laupepa in other parts of Samoa. The boys band played concerts for the Samoans, who were entertained with food and liquor through the night. The German ship could have easily blown Kaimiloa out of the water, but might have suspected it was somehow backed by the United States.

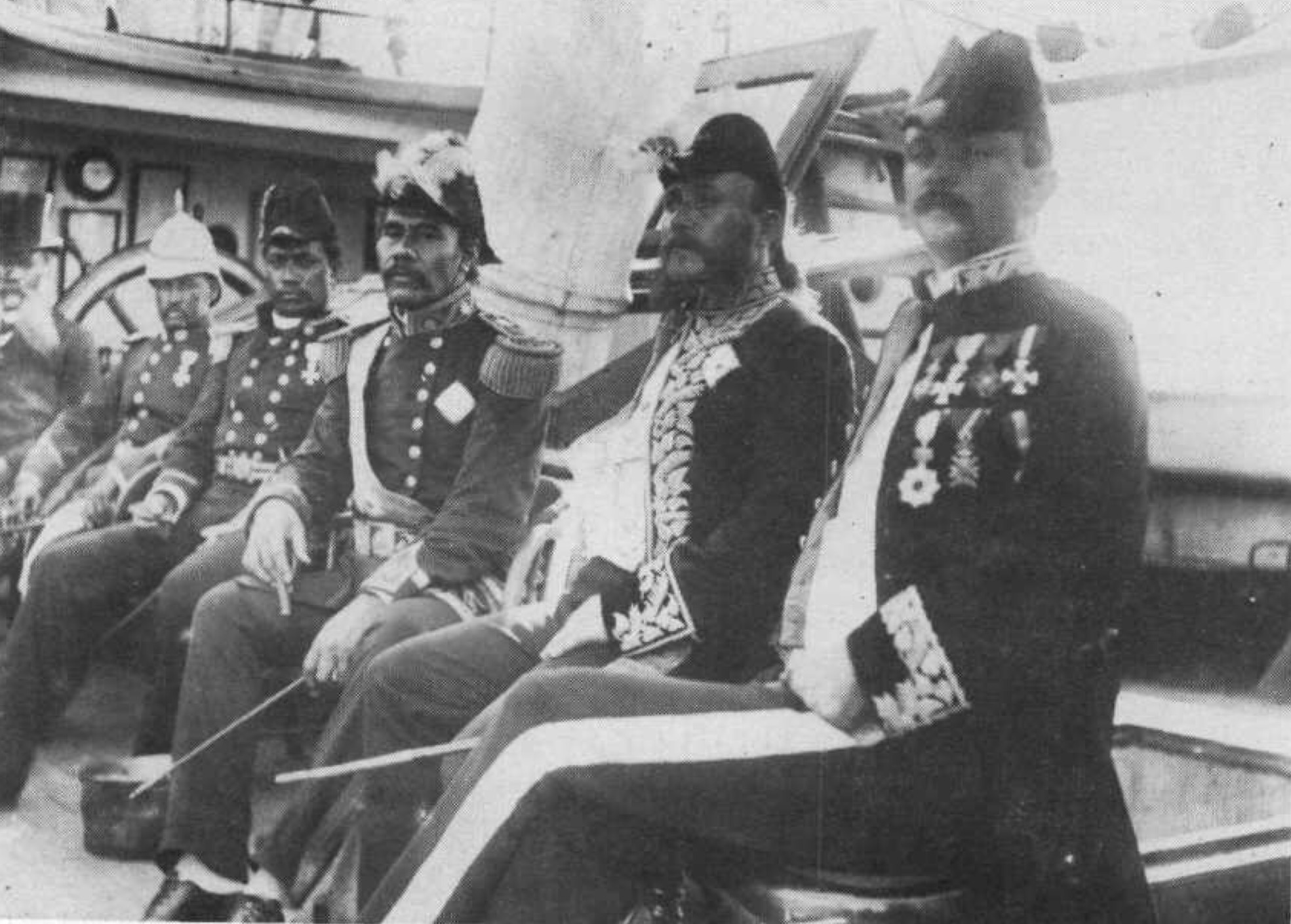
Aboard Kaimiloa, right to left: Poor, Bush, Malietoa Laupepa

When he returned to Apia on July 19, Bush found a letter from Gibson replacing him as envoy with his secretary Henry F. Poor. Gibson cited a letter complaining about Bush's conduct, which later turned out of be fake. In the meanwhile, back in Hawaii, on June 30, 1887, a group of businessmen and lawyers supported by the Honolulu Rifles had forced Kalākaua to dismiss Gibson and sign a new constitution that limited the monarch's powers. The expense of the Polynesian expedition was given as a motivation for the takeover. The English-language press in Hawaii satirically called the effort "the Empire of the Calabash" and suggesting creating additional decorations for "the Order of the Tattooed Drinking Gourd and the Order of the Royal Cuspidor", or awarding gold-plated loincloths.

Kaimiloa was ordered back to Honolulu, but Bush refused to go aboard. The ship crew violated their orders, and landed in Pago Pago (on another Samoan island) where they sold the ship's silver service and some arms for food and drink. Kaimiloa finally left Samoa on August 23, and on the next day, Germany declared war on Laupepa. Laupepa, lucky to escape with his life, never received the promised aid except for the naval dress uniform and medal. Stevenson quotes him as saying: "If you have come here to teach my people to drink, I wish you had stayed away." The eventual Samoan crisis resulted in partitioning of Samoa into German Samoa in the west and American Samoa in the east. The ship finally returned on September 23, 1887, and was decommissioned and sold for a fraction of the cost of its refitting, ending the brief existence of a pan-Polynesian navy.

=== Political organizer ===
Bush quietly returned to Hawaii and began organizing political opposition groups. On November 22, 1888, he became the first president of Hui Kālaiʻāina, a group of mostly native Hawaiians known as the Hawaiian Political Association in English. From 1889 to 1896 published the Hawaiian language newspapers Ka Leo o ka Lāhui ("the voice of the nation" in Hawaiian) and Ka Oiaio ("the truth"). Ka Leo o ka Lāhui, with a circulation of 5000, was the leading Hawaiian language newspaper of the 1890s. After the failed Wilcox Rebellion of 1889, Bush was the subject of a lawsuit for libel by Lorrin A. Thurston. In October 1889 he was fined for contempt for publishing articles that would "bring the Court into ridicule and bad odor." In the 1890 and 1892 elections, Bush was elected to the house of representatives for Oʻahu.

Over time Bush lost confidence in the monarchy and advocated a liberal democratic republic. Although he loyally served earlier rulers, he no longer supported Queen Liliʻuokalani or her administration. Bush was an organizer and first president of the Hawaiian National Liberal Party in early 1892, using his papers to promote the cause. He continued to publish editorials saying "the base of the throne is decayed, and no severe shock will be awaited to topple it over." In a May 12 editorial, he called Marshall Charles Burnett Wilson and cabinet minister Samuel Parker "a half-Tahitian blacksmith and a half-caste cowboy... pitiful specimens of ignorance." The 1892 elections resulting in a three-way split of power with no party having majority control. After the elections Joseph Nawahi then became president of the Liberal Party, objecting to Bush's aggressive anti-monarchy stance. When Liliʻuokalani proposed a new constitution to break the political crisis in January 1893, the Honolulu Rifles were again behind the overthrow of the Kingdom of Hawaii by the conservative Reform Party.

Out of political favor, Bush's only government position was a court interpreter, as he struggled to keep his newspaper business profitable. At one time he endorsed Doan's Pills to cure Kidney pain. In May 1900, he spoke and acted as interpreter at the organizational meeting of the Hawaii Democratic Party, was a member of its first territorial committee, and campaigned unsuccessfully in the next election. His former ally Robert William Wilcox had formed the Home Rule Party of Hawaii which split opposition voters.

== Family life and legacy ==
He first married Mary Ann Peters, who was considered one of the most beautiful women in the Hawaiian Islands and presented a lei around the neck of Prince Alfred, Duke of Edinburgh on his visit to Hawaii in 1869. In 1883, she fell off her horse while riding in the Pali. The accident left her unconscious and she died shortly of a fractured skull. After her death, he married Mary Julia Glennie (1868–1932) in 1884. He had a son also named John Edward Bush, born on January 31, 1890, and several other children. He died on June 28, 1906, from a stroke, and was buried in Makiki Cemetery.

A street was named Bush Lane for him in Honolulu near the Punchbowl Crater at 21°19′1″N 157°51′2″W.

Government offices
| Preceded by Celso Caesar Moreno; Simon Kaloa Kaai | Minister of Finance, Kingdom of Hawaii; 1880–1880; 1882–1882 | Succeeded by William Lowthian Green; Walter M. Gibson |
| Preceded by Celso Caesar Moreno | Minister of Foreign Affairs, Kingdom of Hawaii; 1880–1880 (acting) | Succeeded by William Lowthian Green |
| Preceded by Samuel Gardner Wilder | Minister of the Interior, Kingdom of Hawaii; 1882–1883 | Succeeded by Henry A. P. Carter |
