= Ministry of Foreign Affairs (Hawaii) =

Governmental office of the Republic of Hawaii

Foreign Minister of the Kingdom (Republic) of Hawaii Kuhina o ko na Aina E
- Flag of Hawaii
- Appointer: Monarchs of Hawaii; President of Hawaii
- Inaugural holder: Gerrit P. Judd
- Formation: 1843

The Minister of Foreign Affairs (Hawaiian: Kuhina o ko na Aina E) was a powerful office in the Kingdom of Hawaii, the Provisional Government of Hawaii and the Republic of Hawaii from 1843 to 1900. It made up one of the four offices of the monarchical or presidential cabinet which advised the Head of State of Hawaii on executive affairs. During the monarchy, ministers were also ex-officio members of the Privy Council and the House of Nobles in the legislature. During the republic, ministers were ex-officio members of both houses of the legislature. The head of state had the power to appoint the ministers but later Hawaiian constitutions limited the power the head of state had in removing the cabinet ministers by requiring a vote of no confidence from a majority of the elective members of the legislature. All acts of the head of state had to be countersigned by a minister.

== Ministers of Foreign Affairs ==
| # | Name | Picture | Birth | Death | Assumed office | Left office | Notes | Head of state |
|---|---|---|---|---|---|---|---|---|
| 1 | Gerrit Parmele Judd | | April 23, 1803 | July 12, 1873 | November 2, 1843 | March 26, 1845 | | Kamehameha III |
| 2 | Robert Crichton Wyllie | | October 13, 1798 | October 19, 1865 | March 26, 1845 | October 19, 1865 | | Kamehameha III, Kamehameha IV, and Kamehameha V |
| 3 | Charles de Varigny | | November 25, 1829 | November 9, 1899 | December 21, 1865 | November, 1869 | Office terminated after returning to France. | Kamehameha V |
| 4 | Charles Coffin Harris | | June 9, 1822 | July 2, 1881 | December 21, 1869 | August 25, 1872 | | Kamehameha V |
| 5 | Ferdinand William Hutchison | | circa 1819 | May 20, 1893 | September 10, 1872 | January 10, 1873 | | Kamehameha V, Lunalilo |
| 6 | Charles Reed Bishop | | January 25, 1822 | June 7, 1915 | January 10, 1873 | February 17, 1874 | | Lunalilo, Kalākaua |
| 7 | William Lowthian Green | | September 13, 1819 | December 7, 1890 | February 17, 1874 | December 5, 1876 | 1st term | Kalākaua |
| 8 | Henry Alpheus Peirce Carter | | August 7, 1837 | November 1, 1891 | December 5, 1876 | March 1, 1878 | | Kalākaua |
| 9 | Henry Augustus Peirce | | December 15, 1808 | July 29, 1885 | March 1, 1878 | July 3, 1878 | | Kalākaua |
| 10 | John Mākini Kapena | | 1843 | October 23, 1887 | July 3, 1878 | August 14, 1880 | | Kalākaua |
| 11 | Celso Caesar Moreno | | 1830 | May 22, 1901 | August 14, 1880 | August 19, 1880 | | Kalākaua |
| | John Edward Bush | | February 15, 1842 | June 28, 1906 | August 19, 1880 | September 22, 1880 | acting | Kalākaua |
| 12 | William Lowthian Green | | September 13, 1819 | December 7, 1890 | September 22, 1880 | May 20, 1882 | 2nd term | Kalākaua |
| 13 | Walter Murray Gibson | | March 6, 1822 | January 21, 1888 | May 20, 1882 | June 30, 1886 | 1st term | Kalākaua |
| 14 | Robert James Creighton | | circa 1835 | May 22, 1893 | June 30, 1886 | October 13, 1886 | | Kalākaua |
| 15 | Walter Murray Gibson | | March 6, 1822 | January 21, 1888 | October 13, 1886 | July 1, 1887 | 2nd term | Kalākaua |
| 16 | Godfrey Brown | | 1838 | January 9, 1928 | July 1, 1887 | December 28, 1887 | | Kalākaua |
| 17 | Jonathan Austin | | November 7, 1829 | December 7, 1892 | December 28, 1887 | June 17, 1890 | | Kalākaua |
| 18 | John Adams Cummins | | March 17, 1835 | March 21, 1913 | June 17, 1890 | February 25, 1891 | | Kalākaua, Liliuokalani |
| 19 | Samuel Parker | | June 23, 1853 | July 4, 1920 | February 25, 1891 | November 1, 1892 | 1st term | Liliuokalani |
| 20 | Joseph Kahoʻoluhi Nāwahī | | January 13, 1842 | September 14, 1896 | November 1, 1892 | November 1, 1892 | | Liliuokalani |
| 21 | Mark Prever Robinson | | July 4, 1852 | April 2, 1915 | November 8, 1892 | January 12, 1893 | | Liliuokalani |
| 22 | Samuel Parker | | June 23, 1853 | July 4, 1920 | January 13, 1893 | January 17, 1893 | 2nd term | Liliuokalani |
| 23 | Sanford Ballard Dole | | April 23, 1844 | June 9, 1926 | January 17, 1893 | July 4, 1894 | Served as Head of State also | Himself as Head of Provisional Government |
| 24 | Francis March Hatch | | June 7, 1852 | March 19, 1923 | July 4, 1894 | November 6, 1895 | | President Dole |
| 25 | Henry Ernest Cooper | | August 28, 1857 | May 15, 1929 | November 6, 1895 | October 28, 1896 | 1st term | President Dole |
| | William Owen Smith | | August 4, 1848 | April 13, 1929 | October 28, 1896 | December 26, 1896 | acting | President Dole |
| 26 | Henry Ernest Cooper | | August 28, 1857 | May 15, 1929 | December 26, 1896 | April 17, 1897 | 2nd term | President Dole |
| 27 | Samuel Mills Damon | | March 13, 1845 | July 1, 1924 | April 17, 1897 | April 28, 1897 | | President Dole |
| 28 | Henry Ernest Cooper | | August 28, 1857 | May 15, 1929 | April 28, 1897 | March 29, 1899 | 3rd term | President Dole |
| 29 | Ernest Augustus Mott-Smith | | May 12, 1873 | July 28, 1935 | March 29, 1899 | June 14, 1900 | | President Dole |

== See also ==
- Cabinet of the Kingdom of Hawaii

Other members of the Hawaiian Cabinet

- Ministry of Finance (Hawaii)
- Ministry of the Interior (Hawaii)
- Ministry of Public Instruction (Hawaii)
- Attorney General of Hawaii

== Sources ==
- Ben Cahoon (ed.). "Hawaiian Governments 1795-1900". worldstatesmen.org.
- William Fremont Blackman (1906). "Appendix A. List of Hawaiian Officials". The Making of Hawaii: a Study in Social Evolution. The Macmillan Company. pp. 241–243.
- Newbury, Colin (2001). "Patronage and Bureaucracy in the Hawaiian Kingdom, 1840–1893". Pacific Studies. 24 (1–2). Laie, HI: Brigham Young University, Hawaii Campus: 1–38. OCLC 607265842. Archived from the original on April 15, 2012.
- Thomas G. Thrum (1890). "A List of All the Cabinet Ministers Who Have Held Office in the Hawaiian Kingdom". All about Hawaii. Honolulu: Honolulu Star-Bulletin. pp. 92–97.
