= Edward Preston =

American judge

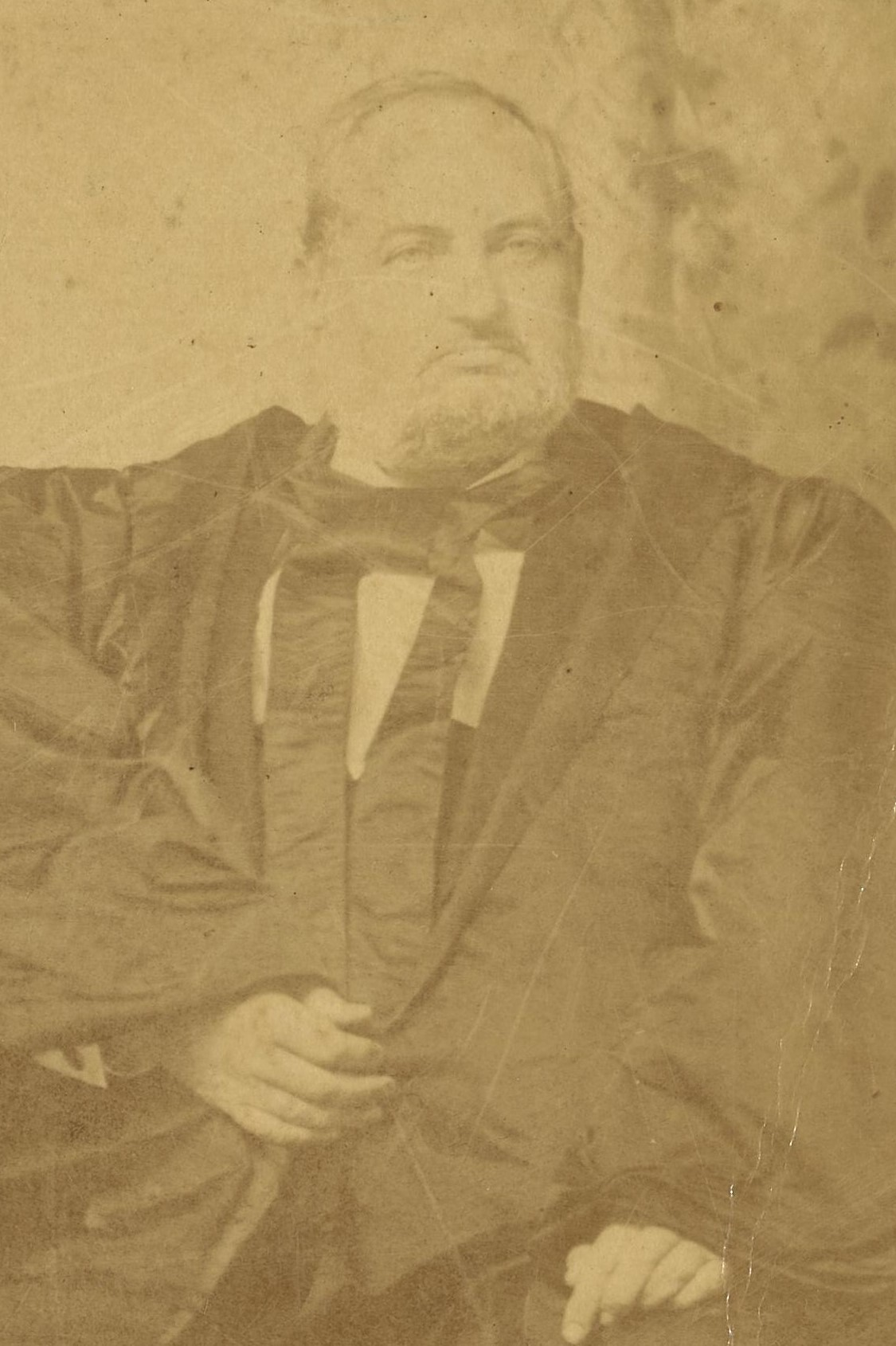
Edward Preston in 1885

Edward Preston (17 February 1831 – 17 January 1890) was a lawyer and judge originally from England who served in the Kingdom of Hawaii.

== Early life ==
Edward Preston was born 17 February 1831 in London, England. In 1852 he sailed to Melbourne, Australia, and then practised law in Christchurch, New Zealand in the firm Wynn Williams & Co.

== Hawaiian citizenship ==
He married in 1852, and came to the Hawaiian Islands with his wife in 1870. He became a citizen of the Kingdom of Hawaii on 1 April 1871, and was admitted to the bar 5 April 1871. He worked in the offices of Richard H. Stanley in 1875. He was awarded the Royal Order of Kapiolani with rank of grand officer.

== Political career ==
He was appointed Attorney General on 3 July 1878 by King Kalākaua, and served until 14 August 1880. He replaced Alfred S. Hartwell. In the 1878, 1880, and 1882 sessions he was in the legislature of the Hawaiian Kingdom in the House of Nobles. Working as a clerk for the judge in the legislature was John Mahiʻai Kāneakua who would sign the memorial from the Hawaiian Patriotic league to restore the monarchy in 1893.

He was appointed again on 19 May 1882, in the cabinet headed by controversial Walter M. Gibson. Gibson was widely known to be funded by sugar trader Claus Spreckels, who also had many personal loans to Kalākaua. The cabinet approved giving Spreckels a large tract of land on Maui to settle his claim on the crown lands, and an expensive coronation ceremony for Kalākaua. Gibson became acting attorney general even though he had no law training, on 14 May 1883.

== Supreme Court ==
On 7 July 1885 Preston was appointed to the supreme court of the kingdom under chief justice Albert Francis Judd. One incident that led to the downfall of Gibson was a Chinese planter T. Aki who said he had made a "gift" to Kalākaua expecting to receive a license for opium trading. When the license was given to someone else who paid more, Aki wanted to get his money back. This scandal and the other debts of Kalākaua resulted in the 1887 Constitution of the Kingdom of Hawaii which took away much of the king's power, and a trustee to pay off debts. Preston ruled that Aki had a valid claim, and he should be paid back with the other creditors.

Preston served on the supreme court until he died 17 January 1890. His funeral was at the St. Andrews Cathedral.

Government offices
| Preceded by Alfred S. Hartwell | Kingdom of Hawaii Attorney General; July 1878 – August 1880 | Succeeded by Claude W. Jones |
| Preceded by Henry A. P. Carter | Kingdom of Hawaii Attorney General; May 1882 – May 1883 | Succeeded by Walter M. Gibson |
