= Orders, decorations, and medals of Hawaii =

Flag of Hawai'i

The orders, decorations, and medals of the Kingdom, Republic, and State of Hawaiʻi include knighthoods, orders of merit and precedence, and military awards and decorations.

== Kingdom of Hawaiʻi ==
The orders and decorations formerly awarded in by the Kingdom of Hawaiʻi are:

=== Royal Orders ===
- Royal Order of Kamehameha I
- Royal Order of Kalākaua I
- Royal Order of Kapiʻolani
- Royal Order of the Crown of Hawaiʻi
- Royal Order of the Star of Oceania
- Royal Household Order for Ladies

=== Royal Medals ===
- King David Kalākaua Election Medal
- Professional Career's Cross
- Royal Hawaiian Agricultural Society Medal
- Coronation Medal of Kalākaua I
- The Round the World Medal

=== Royal Anniversary Medals ===
- Kalākaua and Kapiʻolani Medal
- King Kalākaua I Jubilee Medal

Recipients of the Royal Order of the Crown of Hawai'i
- George Charles Moʻoheau Beckley
- Emmanuel Bushayija
- Archibald Scott Cleghorn
- John Owen Dominis
- Duarte Pio, Duke of Braganza
- John Ena Jr.
- Curtis P. Iaukea
- Charles Hastings Judd
- Junius Kaʻae
- John Mākini Kapena
- Kapiʻolani
- Victoria Kinoiki Kekaulike
- Likelike
- Liliʻuokalani
- Poʻomaikelani

== Republic of Hawaiʻi ==
The Orders and decorations formerly awarded by the Republic of Hawaiʻi are:

- National Guard of Hawaiʻi Medal

== State of Hawaiʻi ==
=== Hawaii National Guard State Awards ===
- Hawaii Medal of Honor
- Hawaii Medal for Valor
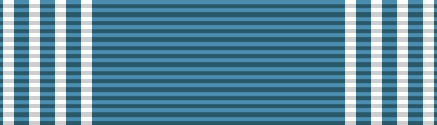
- Hawaii Distinguished Service Order
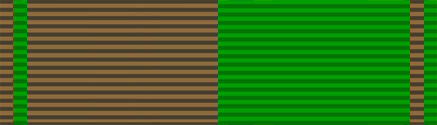
- Hawaii Medal for Merit
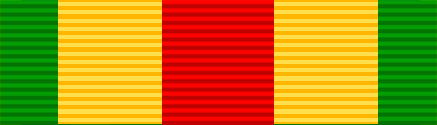
- Hawaii Commendation Medal
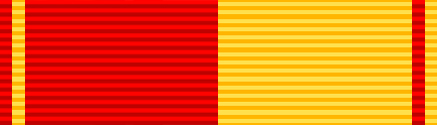
- Hawaii Service Medal (type 2)
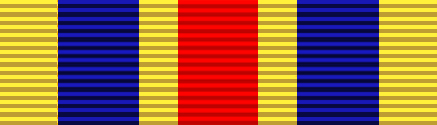
- Hawaii State Active Duty Ribbon
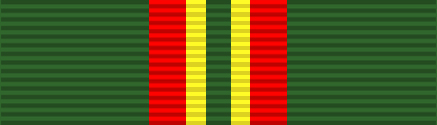
- Hawaii 1968 Federal Service Ribbon
- Hawaii Active Duty Basic Training Ribbon
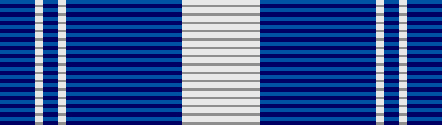
- Hawaii Hurricane Iniki Ribbon
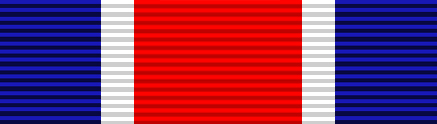
- Hawaii Operation Kokua Ribbon
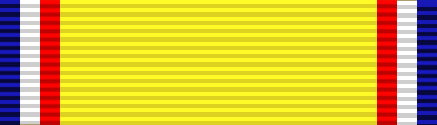
- Hawaii Recruiting Ribbon

=== Others ===
- Living Treasures of Hawaiʻi have been awarded since 1976 by the Buddhist temple Honpa Hongwanji Mission of Hawaiʻi
