= Curtis P. Iaukea =

Hawaiian and American politician (1855–1940)

Curtis Piʻehu Iaukea
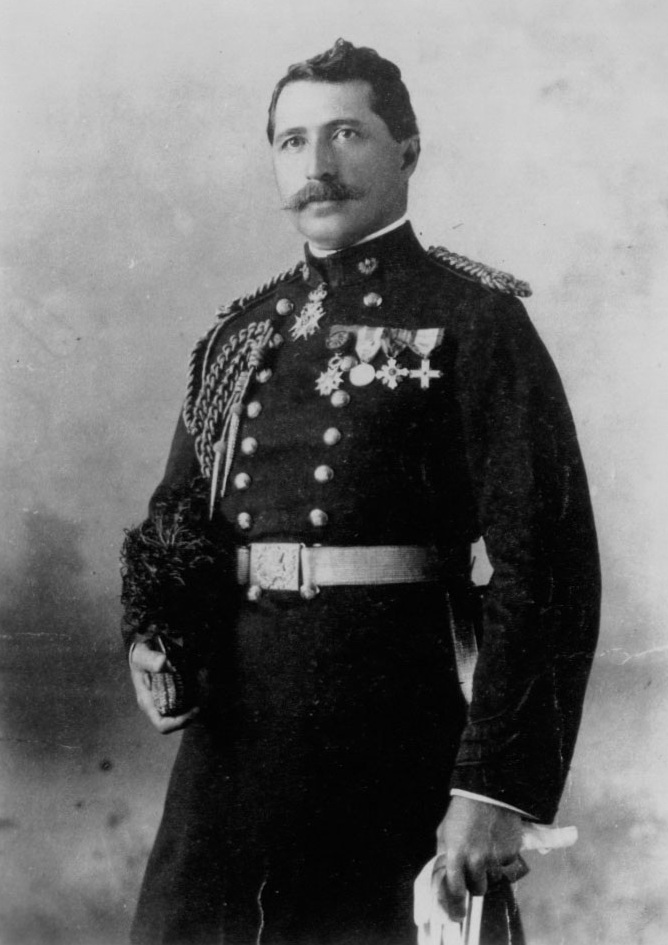

Governor of Oahu
- In office October 4, 1886 – August 5, 1887
- Monarch: Kalākaua

Secretary of Hawaii
- In office May 3, 1917 – October 12, 1921

Acting Governor of Hawaii
- In office December 30, 1919 – March 30, 1920
- Governor: Charles J. McCarthy

Member of the Territory of Hawaii Senate for the Third District
- In office 1913–1915

Personal details
- Born: December 13, 1855 Waimea, Hawaii, Kingdom of Hawaii
- Died: March 5, 1940 (aged 84) Honolulu, Oahu, Territory of Hawaii
- Resting place: Oahu Cemetery
- Party: National; Democrat
- Spouse: Charlotte Kahaloipua Hanks
- Children: Lorna Kahilipuaokalani Iaukea Watson; Frederick Hanks Nalaniahi Iaukea
- Education: St. Alban's College
- Occupation: Diplomat, Envoy, Politicians

Military service
- Allegiance: Kingdom of Hawaii; Republic of Hawaii
- Years of service: 1878–1893; 1895–1898
- Rank: Colonel, Adjutant General, Captain, Major and Quartermaster
- Unit: Prince’s Own; King's Staff; Queen's Staff; General Staff of the Republic

Colonel Curtis Piʻehu Iaukea (December 13, 1855 – March 5, 1940) served as a court official, army officer and diplomat of the Kingdom of Hawaii. He later became an influential official for the subsequent regimes of the Provisional Government and the Republic and the Territory of Hawaii.

Iaukea was raised from an early age to serve the Hawaiian royal family. He first gained prominence during the reign of King Kalākaua when he served as an important court official and an army officer in the volunteer army of the Kingdom of Hawaii. He held numerous significant positions including governor of Oahu and chamberlain to the Royal Household. He also served as Hawaii's ambassador to Europe and Asia, attending the coronation of Tsar Alexander III of Russia and the Golden Jubilee of Queen Victoria. Iaukea received numerous Hawaiian honors and foreign decorations during his service to the kingdom. Following the overthrow of the monarchy, he continued to work for the subsequent regimes of the Provisional Government and the Republic of Hawaii. He served as an officer on the military staff of President Sanford B. Dole and represented the Republic at the Diamond Jubilee of Queen Victoria.

After Hawaii's annexation to the United States, he became a member of the Democratic Party of Hawaii and served in many official positions in the newly created Territory of Hawaii including sheriff of Honolulu County, senator of the Third District, secretary of Hawaii, and acting governor of Hawaii. As one of the last surviving representatives of the Hawaiian royal court, he served as business manager and private secretary to the deposed Queen Liliʻuokalani until her death in 1917.

== Early life and family ==
Curtis Piʻehu Iʻaukea was born December 13, 1855, in Waimea, on the island of Hawaii. Descended from the Hawaiian aliʻi (noble) class, his parents were John W. Iaukea and Lahapa Nalanipo. His father served as the district magistrate of Hamakua and their family were well-known on the island of Hawaii. From his paternal line, he descended from Namiki, a priest of the Pa‘ao order, and Kahiwa Kānekapōlei, a daughter of Kamehameha I. On his mother's side, he descended from Kalanipo or Nalanipo, a descendant of the ʻI clan of Hilo and the Mahi clan of Kohala. His mother's family were also related to Kekuʻiapoiwa II, the mother of King Kamehameha I. His family were considered to be of the Hawaiian kaukau aliʻi rank, or lower ranking chiefs in service to the royal family.

He and his sister Maraea were born in the family's home in Waimea, which stood across the Waikōloa Stream from the residence of early American Protestant missionary Lorenzo Lyons who was a close friend of the family. Iaukea was given the first name Curtis after Lyons' son Curtis Jere Lyons. When he was later presented to King Kamehameha IV as a young child, the king gave him the additional name Piʻehu in respect of his shyness and lighter skin complexion. At court, he was known and referred to by his Hawaiian name Piʻehu. (Note: In his memoir, Iaukea recalled how he received his name Piʻehu How I received my Hawaiian name, Piʻehu, was told to me by my aunt, Keliʻiʻaipala. It came about quite unexpectedly on the day my uncle took me to see the King. At the door of the King's chambers, I pulled on my uncle's hand and tried to hold back. I was a little afraid of the King because he wore a beard, and never having seen anyone wearing one before, I tried to hide behind the door. The King, seeing me, said in Hawaiian to my uncle, "Pi maoli kou keiki" ("your child is truly shy".) After my uncle had succeeded in moving nearer to the King, with me still trying to hide behind his legs, the King commented about my complexion being lighter than that of most Hawaiians, saying that I was 'ehu. Apparently, having been impressed with both my shyness and my complexion, the King added, "Haina kou keiki Piʻehu!" ("Name your child, Piʻehu!").)

Shortly after birth, he was adopted by his maternal uncle Kaihupaʻa to be raised in the Hawaiian custom of hānai, an informal form of adoption between extended families practiced by Hawaiian royals and commoners alike. His uncle had been educated by the American Protestant missionary Levi Chamberlain and had served his entire life as a personal assistant and servant to King Kamehameha III and later his successor Kamehameha IV. Iaukea was taken to the kingdom's capital at Honolulu to live with Kaihupaʻa and his wife Keliaipala. They lived near the grounds of the old ʻIolani Palace, in the building of the former Royal School. Renamed Halepoepoe (meaning circular or round house), this building had been turned into a home for royal retainers and the kahu (caretakers) for the reigning King Kamehameha IV. Around the time he was five or six, Iaukea fell into a well and his uncle Kaihupaʻa broke his foot in the process of saving him, later dying from the injuries he sustained.

== Childhood and education ==
Iaukea was raised at the Hawaiian court to become a kahu and continue his family kuleana (responsibility) of serving the Hawaiian royal family. The young boy was intended to be raised as a page or valet, and companion for Prince Albert Edward Kamehameha, the only son and heir of Kamehameha IV and his wife Queen Emma. These plans were never realized because the prince died in 1862, at the age of four. In later life, Iaukea noted,

Of the more vivid and enduring of my boyhood impressions, I recall the days when, as a bare footed urchin of five and six, I used to romp around the Palace Grounds, dancing attendance on royalty in the role of page and valet to His Royal Highness, the Prince of Hawaii — Ka Haku-o-Hawaii, as he was more familiarly known amongst royalty and Hawaiians, then, well on in his fourth year and in the full enjoyment of health and happy childhood.

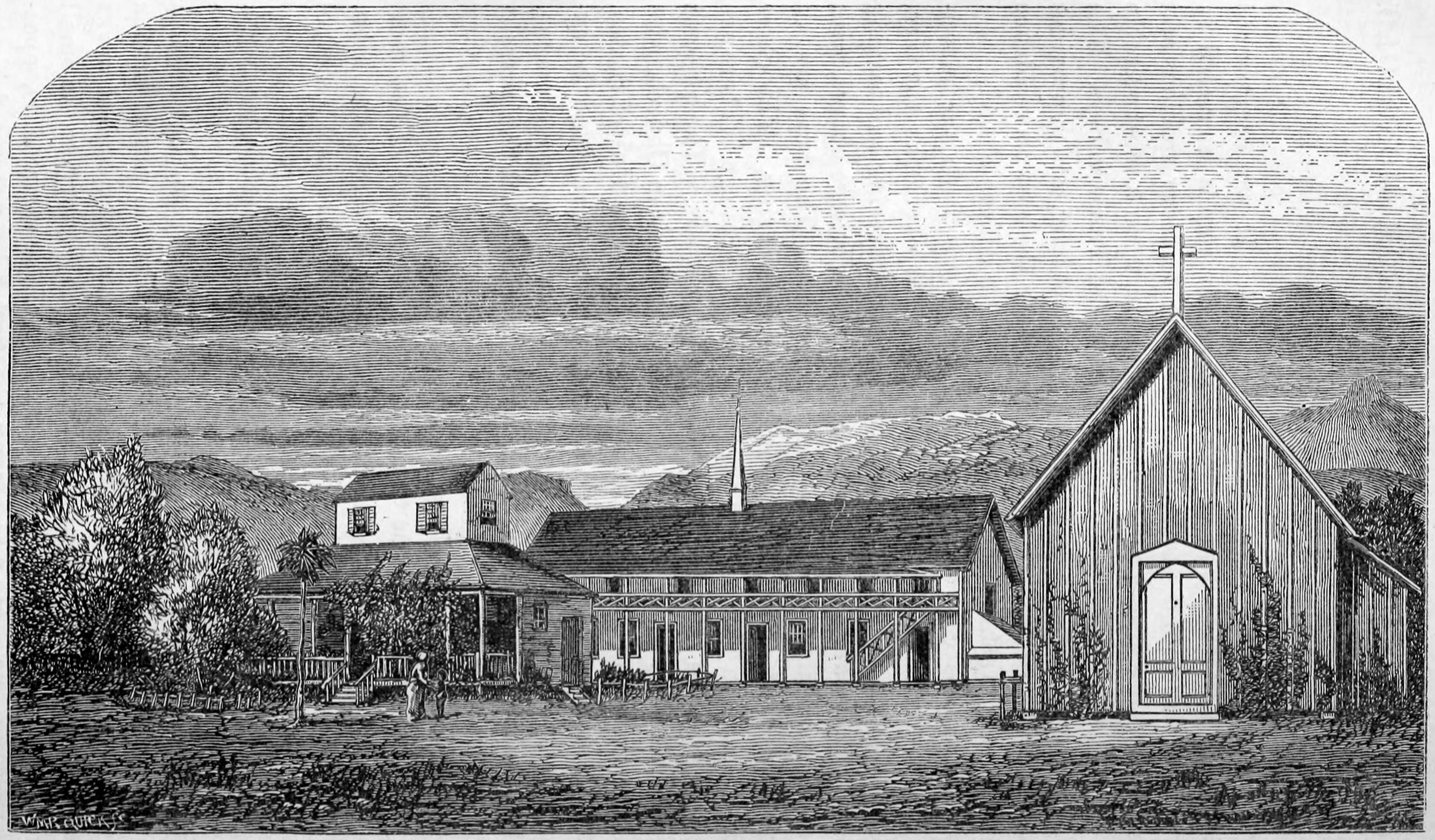
St. Alban's College, Honolulu, 1866

As a ward of the Hawaiian government, he was sent to an Anglican boarding school. Around 1862 or 1863, Iaukea was enrolled in St. Alban's College, founded by Bishop Thomas Nettleship Staley and his assistants Archdeacon George Mason and Rev. Edmund Ibbotson, which was located in the Pauoa Valley. Here he first developed a friendship with William Pitt Leleiohoku, the hānai son of Princess Keʻelikōlani. Their bond was later compared to the friendship of Damon and Pythias.

In 1863, the school was relocated and merged with the Luaʻehu School, in Lahaina, Maui, established by the Anglican Rev. William R. Scott and later administered by Archdeacon Mason who served as Iaukea's mentor. In 1870, he returned to Oahu when the school was again relocated back to its original site. These institutions were the precursors of the present ʻIolani School in Honolulu. Some of his other classmates included Samuel Nowlein and Robert Hoapili Baker, both of whom were politicians in later life.

== Service to the monarchy ==
In 1871, before leaving Hawaii, Archdeacon Mason informed Iaukea that had Kamehameha IV still been living, he would have intended for him to continue his education in Europe, and eventually to groom him to become an ordained chaplain for the royal family. Iaukea was deeply touched by the high expectations of his deceased benefactor. After finishing his education, he served King Kamehameha V as a kāhili bearer and steward at the palace, awaiting an assignment from the king.

In 1872, the king sent Iaukea and William K. Hutchison, the son of Ferdinand William Hutchison, to Lahaina where they learned the art of sugar boiling in the growing sugar industry on Maui, and helped manage the West Maui Sugar Plantation, in which the king had a share. They were placed under the care of Governor Paul Nahaolelua. After the king's death in 1872, Iaukea briefly left his service to the royal court and moved to Hilo to live with his sister Maraea and her husband Charles Akono Nui Akau, a Chinese-Hawaiian manager of the Paukaʻa Sugar Plantation. The listless Iaukea enjoyed his new-found independence, but he also felt unfulfilled. He later wrote: "I was dangling at a loose end. And even though I was enjoying my independence, I was aware that I did not know just where I was going or what I ought to do. I was frustrated without realizing it."

=== Reign of Kalākaua ===
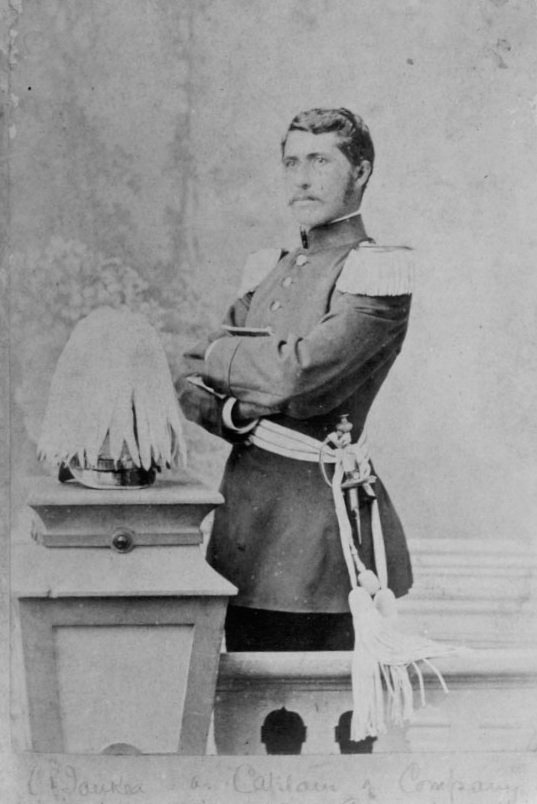
Colonel Iaukea as a young officer, 1878

Following the short reign of Lunalilo, King Kalākaua ascended to the throne of Hawaii in 1874. During a tour of the island of Hawaii, Iaukea caught the eye of the new king who commanded him to return to the royal court. He became a personal aide to the king's younger brother, and former schoolmate, Prince William Pitt Leleiohoku. Both men were of a similar age and shared the same interest in sports and music. He became a member of the Kawaihau Glee Club, sponsored by the Prince and his friends, which competed with the singing clubs of the king, Princess Liliʻuokalani and Princess Likelike. Liliʻuokalani noted her brother's group "consisted in a large degree of the very purest and sweetest male voices to be found amongst the native Hawaiians". In later life, Iaukea recalled, "Happy days those were; the days when 'Wine, Women and Song' were the rule of the day." The Prince died on April 7, 1877.

On April 15, 1878, Iaukea was commissioned as captain of the Prince’s Own Artillery Corps, Company A. This unit was a voluntary military regiment reorganized in 1874 and originally headed by King Kalākaua. At this time, the army of the Kingdom of Hawaii consisted of five volunteer companies, including the Prince's Own, and the regular troops of the King's Household Guard. Each unit was subject to being called for active service when necessary.

On November 29, 1878, Iaukea was also appointed to King Kalākaua's personal military staff, with the rank of colonel. The reign of Kalakaua was characterized by his emphasis on military pomp. On October 4, 1886, Iaukea was created adjutant general to the Forces of the Kingdom, succeeding upon the resignation of Charles T. Gulick. According to the military act of 1886, as adjutant general, he was the second-in-command after John Owen Dominis, who was appointed lieutenant general and commander-in-chief with the king as supreme commander and generalissimo.

At different times during the king's reign he held the important posts of tax collector for Koolaupoko, member of the Privy Council of State, commissioner to the Great International Fisheries Exhibition in London, member of the Board of Health, disbursing agent for the Royal Guard, collector general of Customs, commissioner of Crown Lands and land agent, and private secretary to the king, as well as other minor positions and appointments. He served as chamberlain to the Royal Household from 1886 to 1888, succeeding to this post upon the resignation of Charles Hastings Judd. After Dominis' appointment as lieutenant general, Iaukea was appointed as his successor as the governor of Oahu. He served in this position from October 4, 1886, to August 5, 1887, when Dominis was reappointed to the post.

From 1880 to 1883 he served as the secretary of the Foreign Office. In this capacity, he worked as the chief clerk and secretary for Minister of Foreign Affairs William Lowthian Green and later Green's successor Walter Murray Gibson. After a period in the service of this new foreign minister, he was asked to resign by Gibson who appointed his friend Joseph S. Webb to the position instead. Iaukea returned to serve as a staff member of the king, fast becoming a favorite in the royal entourage. During Kalākaua's coronation ceremony in 1883, he played a large ceremonial role as the bearer of the Sword of State, while his wife served as one of the ladies-in-waiting to Queen Kapiʻolani.

Following the coronation ceremony, the king informed Iaukea that he and his cabinet had commissioned him as the head of a diplomatic trip around the world. Iaukea was taken aback by the honor since he had no experience in diplomacy and was only twenty-eight at the time. In this role, Iaukea would become the most traveled member of the Hawaiian administration after Kalākaua who had made a similar world tour in 1881. Commissioned as the kingdom's ambassador with the rank of envoy extraordinary and minister plenipotentiary, he represented Hawaii at the coronation of Tsar Alexander III of Russia on May 27, 1883, and led a subsequent diplomatic tour of the courts of Europe and Japan. Traveling with his secretary, the part-Hawaiian Henry F. Poor, Iaukea made a favorable impression on the courts of Europe. In Russia, they had an audience with the new tsar and tsarina, met Russian Foreign Minister Nikolay Girs, and socialized on an equal footing with the other foreign dignitaries. Iaukea later noted, "the sight of my country's flag floating over the entrance to the Hotel Duseaux besides those of the United States and Japan, gave me an added incentive to meet the responsibilities that lay ahead and discharge them with honor". The two Hawaiians traveled to the courts of Berlin, Vienna, Belgrade, London, Rome, and India and Japan via the Suez Canal. In London, he visited the International Fisheries Exhibition. In Japan, he met with the Emperor Meiji and helped finalize an immigration plan between Japan and Hawaii previously negotiated by Kalākaua during his world tour.

In 1887, he was appointed ambassador to Great Britain, with the rank of envoy extraordinary and minister plenipotentiary to the Court of St James's, and accompanied Queen Kapiʻolani and Princess Liliʻuokalani to the celebration of Queen Victoria's Golden Jubilee. The diplomatic party also included Governor John Owen Dominis, husband of the princess, Colonel James Harbottle Boyd, secretary and attaché to Iaukea, and their attendants. On the journey across the United States, they visited Washington, DC and met with President Grover Cleveland. The Hawaiian party was graciously received during the Jubilee and given the same honor as every nation in attendance. Iaukea translated for Queen Kapiʻolani, who spoke only Hawaiian, during her official audience with Queen Victoria.

Iaukea was decorated with the Royal Order of Kapiolani and the Royal Order of the Crown of Hawaii in 1884, and biographies of him claim he also received all the Hawaiian orders during the reign of Kalākaua, i.e. the honors of the Royal Order of Kamehameha I, the Royal Order of Kalākaua, and the Royal Order of the Star of Oceania. He also received many foreign honors and decorations including Commander (Third Class) Order of the Crown of Thailand, Commander of an unspecified order from the Ottoman Empire, Grand Cross and Cordon of Order of Saint Stanislaus of Russia, the Grand Cross and Ribbon of the Order of the Cross of Takovo of Serbia, the Legion of Honour of France, Grand Cross of the Order of the Crown of Italy, Knight Commander of the Order of St. Olav of Sweden-Norway, Knight Commander of the Order of the Rising Sun of Japan, the Belgian Red Cross, Grand Officer of the Order of the Liberator of Venezuela, the British Queen Victoria Golden Jubilee, and Diamond Jubilee Medal.

== Following the overthrow ==
After Kalākaua's death and the accession of Queen Liliʻuokalani, Iaukea was reappointed colonel of the queen's personal military staff, and as agent of the Crown Lands. The monarchy was overthrown on January 17, 1893, by the Committee of Safety, with the support of United States Minister John L. Stevens, and the landing of American forces from the USS Boston. After a brief transition under the Provisional Government, the oligarchical Republic of Hawaii was established on July 4, 1894, with Sanford B. Dole as president.

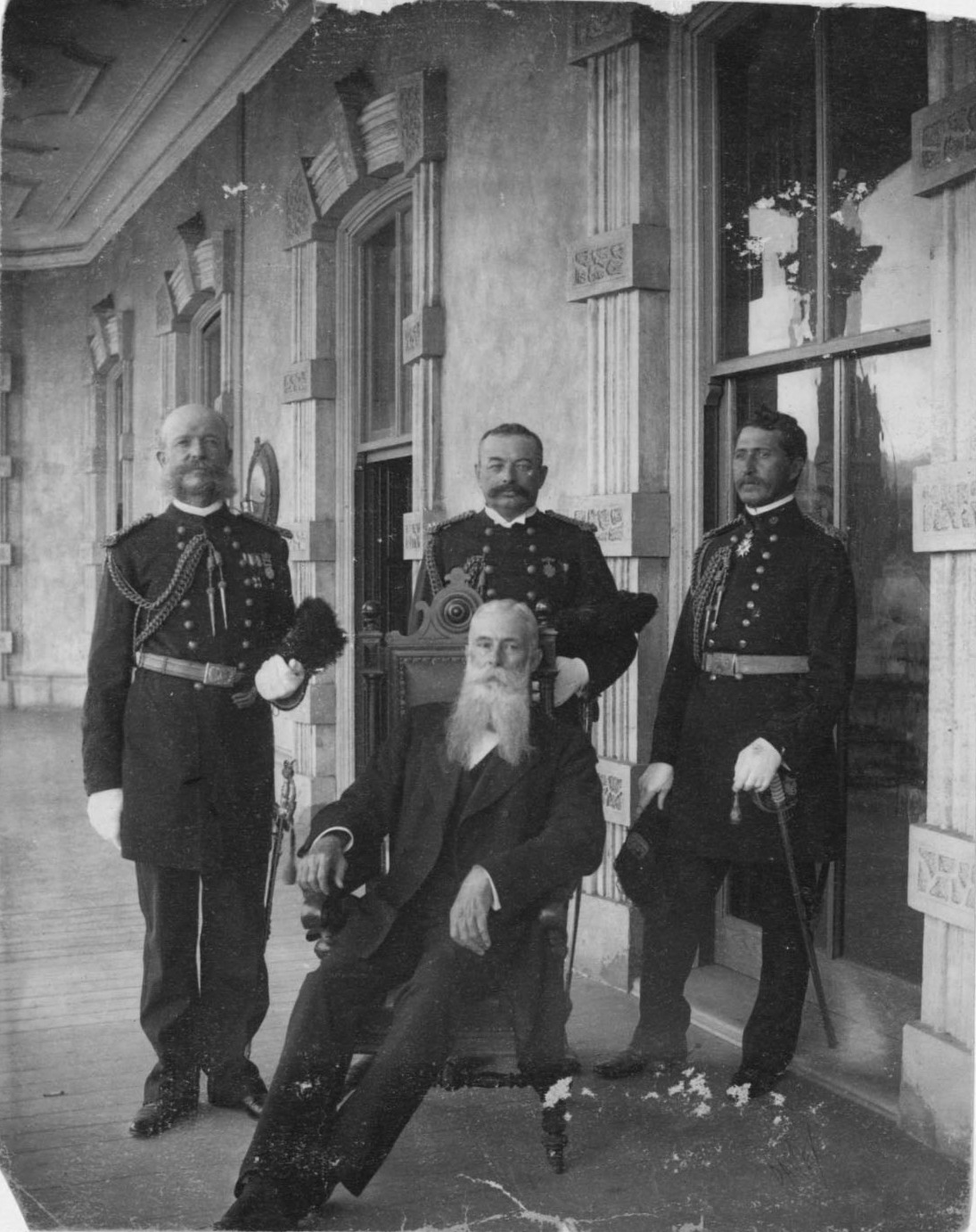
Major Iaukea (right) with other officers and President Sanford B. Dole

Following the overthrow, Iaukea was asked by the Provisional Government to remain in his post as agent of the Crown Lands. He took the oath of allegiance to the new regime on January 24, 1893. According to Iaukea, in later life, he decided to continue working for the two subsequent regimes after consulting with the deposed queen and gaining her approval. He also cited the economic necessity of working for the government since he and his wife had to sell their Honolulu residence around this time. From this point his friendship with Liliʻuokalani cooled with Iaukea noting that "my calls on [her] lacked the personal informality of happier days".

During this period, he worked as the sub-agent of Public Lands. He also served on the Board of Prison Inspectors in 1893, and was appointed special police constable of the Kona District of Oahu in 1894. On November 27, 1895, he was commissioned with the demoted rank of major and quartermaster on the General Staff of the Republic. Having developed a close friendship with the British Crown, Iaukea returned to the United Kingdom to celebrate the Diamond Jubilee of Queen Victoria in 1897. Representing the Republic, he served at the demoted rank of secretary and military attaché to Special Envoy Samuel Mills Damon. In January 1898, he accompanied President Dole and his wife to Washington, DC, also in the role of secretary and military attaché.

== After annexation ==
When the United States annexed Hawaii and established the Territory of Hawaii, Iaukea became involved in local politics as a member of the Democratic Party of Hawaii. In the general election of 1904, he unsuccessfully challenged Prince Jonah Kūhiō Kalanianaʻole, a Republican, for the position of congressional delegate from Hawaii on the Democratic ticket. In the 1906 election, he was elected as the second sheriff of the County of Honolulu, succeeding Arthur M. Brown. He served in this position from 1907 to 1909. He was a trustee of the Queen's Medical Center from 1905 to 1909.

He served as a Democratic member of the Territorial Senate from 1913 to 1915, representing the Third District of Oahu. Under the Democratic Governor Charles J. McCarthy, Iaukea was appointed by President Woodrow Wilson as the Secretary of Hawaii from May 3, 1917, to October 12, 1921, and acting governor of the Territory from December 30, 1919, to March 30, 1920.

After the death of Joseph Oliver Carter, Iaukea became the private secretary and business agent of Liliʻuokalani. From 1909 to 1917, he served in this role and became a trustee of The Queen Liliʻuokalani Trust, a charitable trust established by the queen to manage her landholdings and estate after her death. Iaukea and his wife Charlotte were at Liliʻuokalani's side when she died in 1917. He was the one who raised her royal standard (flag) over Washington Place to signal her death, and was in charge of planning Liliʻuokalani's state funeral. He served as an honorary pallbearer during the funeral procession while his son Frederick Hank Iaukea served as an active pallbearer carrying the catafalque bearing the casket of the queen to her final resting place for entombment with her family members in the Kalākaua Crypt of the Royal Mausoleum of Mauna ʻAla. As a former chamberlain, and one of the last surviving representatives of the former dynasty, he had planned the royal funerals of Princess Kaʻiulani in 1899, Prince David Kawānanakoa in 1908, and Prince Jonah Kūhiō Kalanianaʻole in 1922. He was chairman of the Hawaiian Homes Commission from 1933 to 1935, member of the Archives Commission from 1937 and custodian of the throne room of Iolani Palace from 1937.

Iaukea died in Honolulu, on March 5, 1940, at the age of 84. He was buried at the Oahu Cemetery. As the last surviving court member of the defunct monarchy, Iaukea was regarded as an important authority on the past during his lifetime but also as a positive example of those who adapted to the changing politics of the islands. His great-great-granddaughter Sydney Lehua Iaukea noted:

Curtis P. Iaukea not only embodied these changes but was directly implicated in this process as a permanent figure in the government of both the Hawaiian Kingdom and the Territory of Hawai‘i. Toward the end of his life, he was celebrated as one Hawaiian who made the leap to American citizenry successfully ...
Curtis P. Iaukea was celebrated as a Hawaiian who survived the monarchy and lived to tell about it. He was also regarded as representing all that was apparently good about becoming American, even though until the end of his life the photos of my great-great-grandfather show him proudly wearing the uniforms and medals that accompanied his trips to faraway places as a diplomat for the Hawaiian Kingdom. He was never pictured wearing his uniforms, after the fact, for the Republic of Hawai‘i as its official diplomat. Even so, the territorial government regularly drew on his memories to close the gap between the Hawaiian Kingdom and the territory and in order to legitimize its own existence in the process. It needed to insert its inevitability into the historical narrative, and used my great-great-grandfather’s public memories to represent its "evidence of inheritance."

== Personal life ==
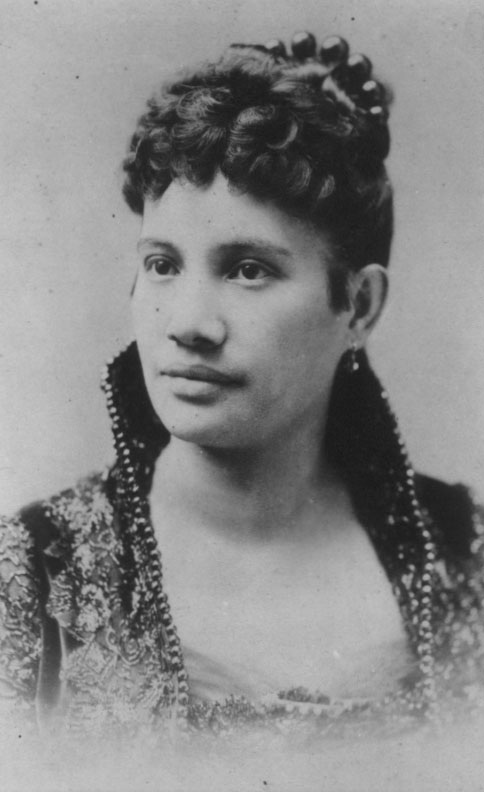
Charlotte Kahaloipua Hanks Iaukea

Iaukea married Charlotte Kahaloipua Hanks (1856–1936) on April 7, 1877. (Note: Historian John Dominis Holt IV recorded her name as Nancy.) They had met through the acquaintanceship of Charlotte's aunt Uwini Auld and Queen Emma. The only daughter of American businessman Frederick Leslie Hanks and Chinese-Hawaiian Akini, Charlotte was of mixed-Caucasian, Native Hawaiian and Chinese descent. Her father was allegedly a relative of Nancy Hanks, the mother of President Abraham Lincoln, and had settled in Hawaii after his second visit in 1853. A descendant of the Kahaloipua line of chiefs, her genealogy was considered of a higher rank than her husband. Her maternal grandfather was the early Chinese businessman Tyhune (i.e. Wong Tai-hoon), who owned the Tyhune Store in downtown Honolulu from the 1830s to the 1850s and invested in sugar, shipping, merchandise, and liquor sales. She inherited lands in Waikiki and Honolulu from her maternal grandmother Wahinekapu, a Hawaiian chiefess and the daughter or sister of Kahanaumaikai, who had been a recipient of land in the Great Māhele. Charlotte served as a lady-in-waiting for Queen Kapiʻolani, and was a close friend of Liliʻuokalani. During the monarchy, she received the honor of Knight Companion of the Royal Order of Kapiolani.

The couple had two children: a son named Frederick Hanks Nalaniahi Iaukea (1881–1944) and a daughter named Lorna Kahilipuaokalani Iaukea (1885–1973), who married Edward B. Watson. Before his death, Iaukea had hired writer and researcher Jeanne Hobbs to write his memoir entrusting her with many of his personal papers. However, he later sued her for not finishing the memoir and demanded the return of these papers, but died before getting them back. Reclaiming these documents from Hobbs after her death in 1953, his daughter Lorna wrote and published the book By Royal Command: The Official Life and Personal Reminiscences of Colonel Curtis Piehu Iaukea at the Court of Hawaii's Rulers using the personal writings of her father. In 2012, his great-great-granddaughter Sydney Lehua Iaukea wrote The Queen and I: A Story of Dispossessions and Reconnections in Hawaiʻi, a book about Iaukea and the role he played in the estate of Queen Liliʻuokalani. Other notable descendants of Iaukea and Charlotte include writer Lesley Kehaunani Iaukea, and professional wrestlers King Curtis Iaukea and Rocky Iaukea.

== Bibliography ==
- Barrere, Dorothy B. (1994). "KAKAHANAUMAIKAI, L LCA 5873" (PDF). The King's Mahele: The Awardees and Their Lands. pp. 124–126. OCLC 31886789.
- Char, Wai-Jane (1974). "Three Chinese Stores in Honolulu". The Hawaiian Journal of History. 8. Honolulu: Hawaiian Historical Society: 11–38. hdl:10524/360. OCLC 60626541.
- Day, Arthur Grove (1984). History Makers of Hawaii: a Biographical Dictionary. Honolulu: Mutual Publishing of Honolulu. ISBN 978-0-935180-09-1. OCLC 11087565. Archived from the original on December 15, 2019.
- Greer, Richard A. (1973). "Collarbone and the Social Evil". The Hawaiian Journal of History. 7. Honolulu: Hawaiian Historical Society: 3–17. hdl:10524/366. OCLC 60626541.
- Hawaii (1918). Lydecker, Robert Colfax (ed.). Roster Legislatures of Hawaii, 1841–1918. Honolulu: Hawaiian Gazette Company. OCLC 60737418. Archived from the original on March 29, 2016.
- Holt, John Dominis (1993). Recollections: Memoirs of John Dominis Holt, 1919–1935. Honolulu: Ku Paʻa. ISBN 9780681027831. OCLC 30886291.
- Hopkins, Jaime Uluwehi (August 2012). Hānau Ma Ka Lolo, For the Benefit of Her Race: a Portrait of Emma Kaʻilikapuolono Metcalf Beckley Nakuina (PDF) (Thesis). Honolulu: University of Hawaii at Manoa. hdl:10125/100964. Archived (PDF) from the original on January 1, 2017.
- Hori, Joan (1981). "Japanese Prostitution in Hawaii During the Immigration Period". The Hawaiian Journal of History. 15. Honolulu: Hawaiian Historical Society: 113–124. hdl:10524/111. OCLC 60626541.
- Iaukea, Curtis Piehu; Watson, Lorna Kahilipuaokalani Iaukea (1988). Schweizer, Niklaus R. (ed.). By Royal Command: The Official Life and Personal Reminiscences of Colonel Curtis Piehu Iaukea at the Court of Hawaii's Rulers. Honolulu: Hui Hanai. ISBN 978-0-9616738-6-4. OCLC 16006083. Archived from the original on February 16, 2017.
- Iaukea, Curtis P. (1930). "Reminiscences of the Court of Kamehameha IV and Queen Emma" (PDF). Papers of the Hawaiian Historical Society (19). Honolulu: Hawaiian Historical Society: 17–27. hdl:10524/961. Archived (PDF) from the original on September 18, 2009.
- Iaukea, Sydney Lehua (2012). The Queen and I: A Story of Dispossessions and Reconnections in Hawaiʻi. Berkeley: University of California Press. ISBN 978-0-520-95030-6. OCLC 763161035.
- Kai, Peggy (1974). "Chinese Settlers in the Village of Hilo Before 1852". The Hawaiian Journal of History. 8. Honolulu: Hawaiian Historical Society: 39–75. hdl:10524/221. OCLC 60626541.
- Kalakaua (1971). Greer, Richard A. (ed.). "The Royal Tourist—Kalakaua's Letters Home from Tokio to London". The Hawaiian Journal of History. 5. Honolulu: Hawaiian Historical Society: 75–109. hdl:10524/186. OCLC 60626541.
- Kanahele, George S. (1999). Emma: Hawaii's Remarkable Queen. Honolulu: University of Hawaii Press. ISBN 978-0-8248-2240-8. OCLC 40890919. Archived from the original on May 8, 2016.
- Karpiel, Frank (1999). "Notes & Queries – The Hale Naua Society". The Hawaiian Journal of History. 33. Honolulu: Hawaiian Historical Society: 203–212. hdl:10524/509. OCLC 60626541.
- Kuykendall, Ralph Simpson (1967). The Hawaiian Kingdom 1874–1893, The Kalakaua Dynasty. Vol. 3. Honolulu: University of Hawaii Press. ISBN 978-0-87022-433-1. OCLC 500374815. Archived from the original on January 20, 2015.
- Liliuokalani (1898). Hawaii's Story by Hawaii's Queen, Liliuokalani. Boston: Lee and Shepard. ISBN 978-0-548-22265-2. OCLC 2387226.
- McKinzie, Edith Kawelohea (1997). Hawaiian Genealogies: Extracted from Hawaiian Language Newspapers. University of Hawaii Press. p. 50. ISBN 9780939154371. OCLC 769212483.
- Newbury, Colin (2001). "Patronage and Bureaucracy in the Hawaiian Kingdom, 1840–1893". Pacific Studies. 24 (1–2). Laie, HI: Brigham Young University, Hawaii Campus: 1–38. OCLC 607265842.
- Proto, Neil Thomas (2009). The Rights of My People: Liliuokalani's Enduring Battle with the United States, 1893–1917. New York: Algora Publishing. ISBN 978-0-87586-720-5. OCLC 319248358.
- Pukui, Mary Kawena; Elbert, Samuel H.; Mookini, Esther T. (1974). Place Names of Hawaii. Honolulu: University of Hawaii Press. ISBN 978-0-8248-0524-1. OCLC 1042464. Archived from the original on November 1, 2019.
- Quigg, Agnes (1988). "Kalakaua's Hawaiian Studies Abroad Program". The Hawaiian Journal of History. 22. Honolulu: Hawaiian Historical Society: 170–208. hdl:10524/103. OCLC 60626541.
- Restarick, Henry Bond (1924). Hawaii, 1778–1920, from the Viewpoint of a Bishop: Being the Story of English and American Churchmen in Hawaii with Historical Sidelights. Honolulu: Paradise of the Pacific. OCLC 1337282. Archived from the original on July 27, 2018.
- Rose, Roger G. (1992). Reconciling the Past: Two Basketry Kāʻai and the Legendary Līloa and Lonoikamakahiki. Honolulu: Bishop Museum Press. ISBN 978-0-930897-76-5. OCLC 28374106. Archived from the original on February 16, 2017.
- Rose, Roger G. (1978). Symbols of Sovereignty: Feather Girdles of Tahiti and Hawaiʻi. Honolulu: Department of Anthropology, Bernice P. Bishop Museum. OCLC 461816715. Archived from the original on April 27, 2016.
- Schweizer, Niklaus R. (1991). "King Kalakaua: An International Perspective". The Hawaiian Journal of History. 25. Honolulu: Hawaiian Historical Society: 103–120. hdl:10524/539. OCLC 60626541.
- Siddall, John William (1917). Men of Hawaii. Vol. 1. Honolulu: Honolulu Star-Bulletin. OCLC 16326675. Archived from the original on April 11, 2016.
- Siddall, John William (1921). Men of Hawaii. Vol. 2. Honolulu: Honolulu Star-Bulletin. OCLC 16326675. Archived from the original on June 5, 2017.
- Siler, Julia Flynn (2012). Lost Kingdom: Hawaii's Last Queen, the Sugar Kings and America's First Imperial Adventure. New York: Atlantic Monthly Press. ISBN 978-0-8021-9488-6. OCLC 881683650. Archived from the original on April 23, 2017.
- Soong, Irma Tam (1997). "Sun Yat-sen's Christian Schooling in Hawaiʻi". The Hawaiian Journal of History. 31. Honolulu: Hawaiian Historical Society: 151–178. hdl:10524/527. OCLC 60626541.
- Taylor, Albert Pierce (1922). Under Hawaiian Skies: A Narrative of the Romance, Adventure and History of the Hawaiian Islands. Honolulu: Advertiser Publishing Company, Ltd. OCLC 479709.
- Taylor, Albert Pierce (1926). Under Hawaiian Skies: A Narrative of the Romance, Adventure and History of the Hawaiian Islands, a Complete Historical Account. Honolulu: Advertiser Publishing Company, Ltd. OCLC 1547523. Archived from the original on February 6, 2017.

Government offices
Preceded by William Jarrett	Secretary of the Foreign Office; 1880–1883	Succeeded by Joseph S. Webb
Preceded by William Fessenden Allen	Collector General of Customs; 1884–1886	Succeeded by John Mākini Kapena
Preceded by Charles Hastings Judd	Chamberlain to the Royal Household; 1886–1888	Succeeded by George W. Macfarlane
Preceded by John Owen Dominis	Governor of Oahu; 1886–1887	Succeeded by John Owen Dominis
Military offices
Preceded by Charles T. Gulick	Adjutant General to the Forces of the Kingdom; 1886–1887	Vacant Title next held by John Harris Soper
Government offices
Preceded by Wade Warren Thayer	Secretary of Hawaii Territory; 1917–1921	Succeeded by Raymond C. Brown
Preceded by Charles J. McCarthy as Governor	Acting Governor of Hawaii Territory; 1919–1920	Succeeded by Charles J. McCarthy as Governor
Preceded by Arthur M. Brown	Sheriff of Honolulu County; 1907–1909	Succeeded by William Paul Jarrett
