= John Dominis Holt =

John Dominis Holt may refer to:

- John Dominis Holt II (1861–1915), Hawaiian colonel and Democratic delegate
- John Dominis Holt IV (1919–1993), Hawaiian writer and cultural historian
