= Dominis =

Dominis is a surname. Notable people with the surname include:

- John Dominis (1921–2013), American Documentary photographer, war photographer and photojournalist
- John ʻAimoku Dominis (1883–1917), son of John Owen Dominis
- John Owen Dominis (1832–1891), American-born statesman
- John Dominis Holt II (1861–1915), Hawaiian military leader
- John Dominis Holt IV (1919-1993), Hawaiian writer
- Marco Antonio de Dominis (1566–1624), Dalmatian ecclesiastic, apostate, and man of science
- Mary Dominis (1803–1889), American settler of Hawaii

== See also ==
- Dominis Conspiracy (Hawaii), also known as the Wilcox Rebellion of 1888
