= Prince's Own Artillery Corps =

Prince’s Own Artillery Corps
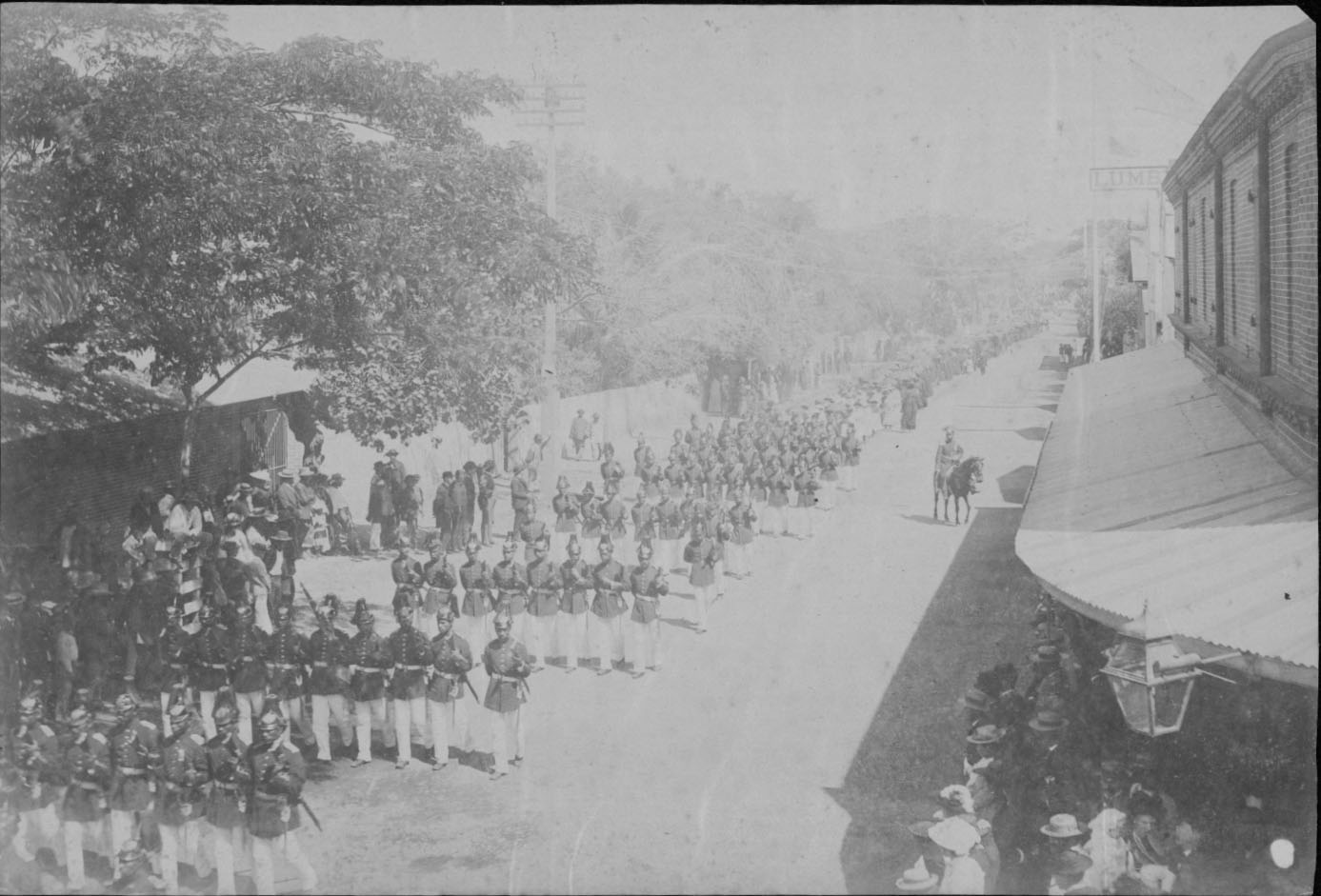
- The Prince’s Own during the funeral procession of Queen Emma of Hawaii
- Active: 1857-1889
- Disbanded: 1889
- Country: (Hawaii) Hawaiian Kingdom
- Allegiance: Hawaiian Kingdom
- Type: Artillery Corps
- Size: 105 (1884)

Commanders
- Notable commanders: David Kalākaua; Curtis P. Iaukea; A. Kaaha; James H. Boyd

The Prince’s Own was one of many Volunteer Companies of the Hawaiian Kingdom.

== History ==
The Prince’s Own (formerly known as the Prince of Hawai’i’s Own) was established in 1874 in response to the re-establishment of the Hawaiian Military following the ascension of Kalākaua. Originally commanded by David Kalākaua, the Prince’s Own was a substitute to the original Honolulu Rifles after its dissolution. The Corps was meant to be the Hawaiian Armies artillery unit and one of the five military companies that made up the Hawaiian Army.

On April 15, 1878 Curtis P. Iaukea was commissioned to lead the Prince’s own (Company A), serving as its Captain for several years before Captain A. Kaaha (Company A.) and Captain James Harbottle Boyd (Company B.) took command.

After the Bayonet Constitution, the new Reform Government instituted a reorganization of the military companies, combining them into “Battalion 2” (Comprising the former companies) and “Battalion 1” (Honolulu Rifles), officially dissolving the Prince’s own.

== Bibliography ==
- Iaukea, Curtis Piehu; Watson, Lorna Kahilipuaokalani Iaukea (1988). Schweizer, Niklaus R. (ed.). By Royal Command: The Official Life and Personal Reminiscences of Colonel Curtis Piehu Iaukea at the Court of Hawaii's Rulers. Honolulu: Hui Hanai. ISBN 978-0-9616738-6-4. OCLC 16006083. Archived from the original on February 16, 2017.
- Iaukea, Sydney Lehua (2012). The Queen and I: A Story of Dispossessions and Reconnections in Hawaiʻi. Berkeley: University of California Press. ISBN 978-0-520-95030-6. OCLC 763161035.
