= Royal Order of Kapiolani =

Order of the Kingdom of Hawai'i

Royal Order of Kapiʻolani (Kapiʻolani e Hookanaka)
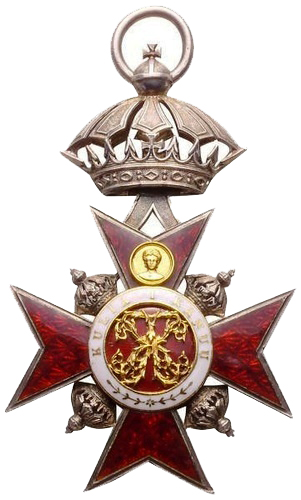
- Commander badge of the order.

Awarded by Kalākaua of Hawaii
- Type: Chivalric order in six classes
- Established: August 39, 1880
- Motto: "KULIA I KANUU"
- Status: Obsolete
- Grades: Grand Cross; High Grand Officer; Grand Officer; Commander; Officer; Companion (Knight); Medal of Honor

Precedence
- Next (higher): Royal Order of Kalākaua
- Next (lower): Royal Order of the Crown of Hawaii
- Grand Cross ribbon

The Royal Order of Kapiʻolani (Kapiʻolani e Hoʻokanaka) was instituted on August 30, 1880, by King Kalākaua to recognize services in the cause of humanity, for merit in Science and the Arts, or for special services rendered to the Kingdom of Hawaiʻi. He named the Order in honor of his ancestor High Chiefess Kapiʻolani the Great, an early exponent of Christianity in the Hawaiian Islands. It also honored his wife Queen Kapiʻolani, the namesake of the first Kapiʻolani. This Order was awarded 177 times in all grades during Kalākaua's reign, and three more times by his successor, Queen Liliʻuokalani. The last award of the Order took place on 2 June 1892; in 1893 the Order became abeyant.

== Grades ==
The Order was awarded in six grades. Granting the insignia and awards of the Order was determined by the number of living members of the Order. At any given time, there could only be:

- Grand Cross – 12 recipients
- High Grand Officer – 15 recipients
- Grand Officer – 20 recipients
- Commander – 30 recipients
- Officer – 50 recipients
- Companion (Knight) – 60 recipients
- Medal of Honor – no limit to recipients, 1st (silver) and 2nd-degree (bronze)

== Insignia of the Order ==
=== Grand Cross ===
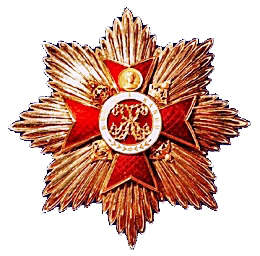
Grand Cross

The insignia of the Grand Cross includes the badge, breast star and grand cordon.

The Order's badge comprises a red enameled gold Maltese cross, surmounted by a gold Hawaiian crown. Between the arms of the cross are gold Hawaiian crowns in angles. A center disc of red and white enamel displays a gold double-K monogram, surrounded by a white enamel band, on which is inscribed "KULIA I KANUU" – "Strive to Reach the Summit". At end of the cross is a small, gold locket with the portrait of Queen Kapiʻolani. On the reverse is a single red disc, with the motto "KULIA".

The star of the Grand Cross of Order is an octagonal silver star, on which is superimposed the badge without the surmounted crown.

The grand cordon is yellow, bordered by narrow stripes of the colors the Hawaiian flag: white, red and dark-blue. The badge is fastened to the sash's bow and rests on the hip.

=== High Grand Officer ===
High Grand Officers bear the same insignia as the Grand Cross, except the badge is not worn on a sash, rather on a neck ribbon of alternating yellow and red strips.

=== Grand Officer ===
Grand Officers wear only the breast star.

=== Commander ===
The insignia of Commander is identical to that of Grand Cross, except the Commander wears only the sash. In addition, on the badge the crowns between the arms of the cross are silver, not gold.

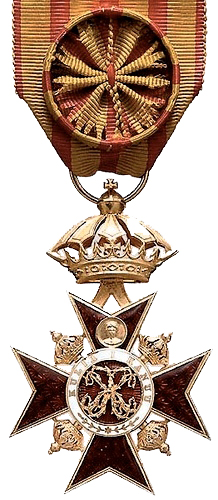
Officer cross

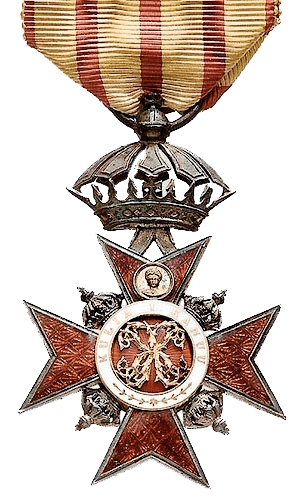
Companion cross

=== Officer & Companion ===
The Officer and Companion cross use an identical badge to that of the Commander, albeit markedly smaller in size. These decorations are breast badges suspended by the badge's crown on a riband of alternating yellow and red stripes. A rosette is affixed to the riband of the Officer cross.

=== Medals of Honor ===
The Medals of Honor are similar to the Companion cross; however they lack the crowns between the arms of the cross and the badge's crown surmounting the cross. The medal of the 1st-degree is made of silver, and the 2nd-degree of bronze.

== Annuity ==
Along with being granted insignia of the Order, an annuity was given to the recipients: $150 for the Grand Cross, $130 for the Grand High Officer, $125 for the Grand Officer, $100 for the Commander, $75 for the Officer and $50 for the Companion.

=== Recipients ===
The first recipient of the Royal Order of Kapiʻolani was Auguste Jean Baptiste Marques. He was made Commander in 1880.

Dr. Charles M. Newell, of Boston wrote several romantic novels about the Hawaiian Islands in the late 19th century, including Kalani of Oahu (1881), Kamehameha the Conquering King (1885) and The Voyage of the Fleetwing (1886) and The Isle of Palms (1888). His Companion is believed awarded in 1885 and was sold by Cowans Auctions in 2010.

Queen Natalie of Serbia was awarded the Grand Cross on 28 June 1883.

The Saint Marianne of Molokaʻi (born Maria Anna Barbara Koob) was awarded the Companion on November 9, 1885, for her work in Hawaiian hospitals and the Hansens Disease (Leprosy) settlement of Kalaupapa.

Dr. Eduard Arning, British-German bacteriologist, was awarded the Companion in 1886 for research in Hansens Disease.
