= Royal Order of Kamehameha I =

Hawaiian order of knighthood

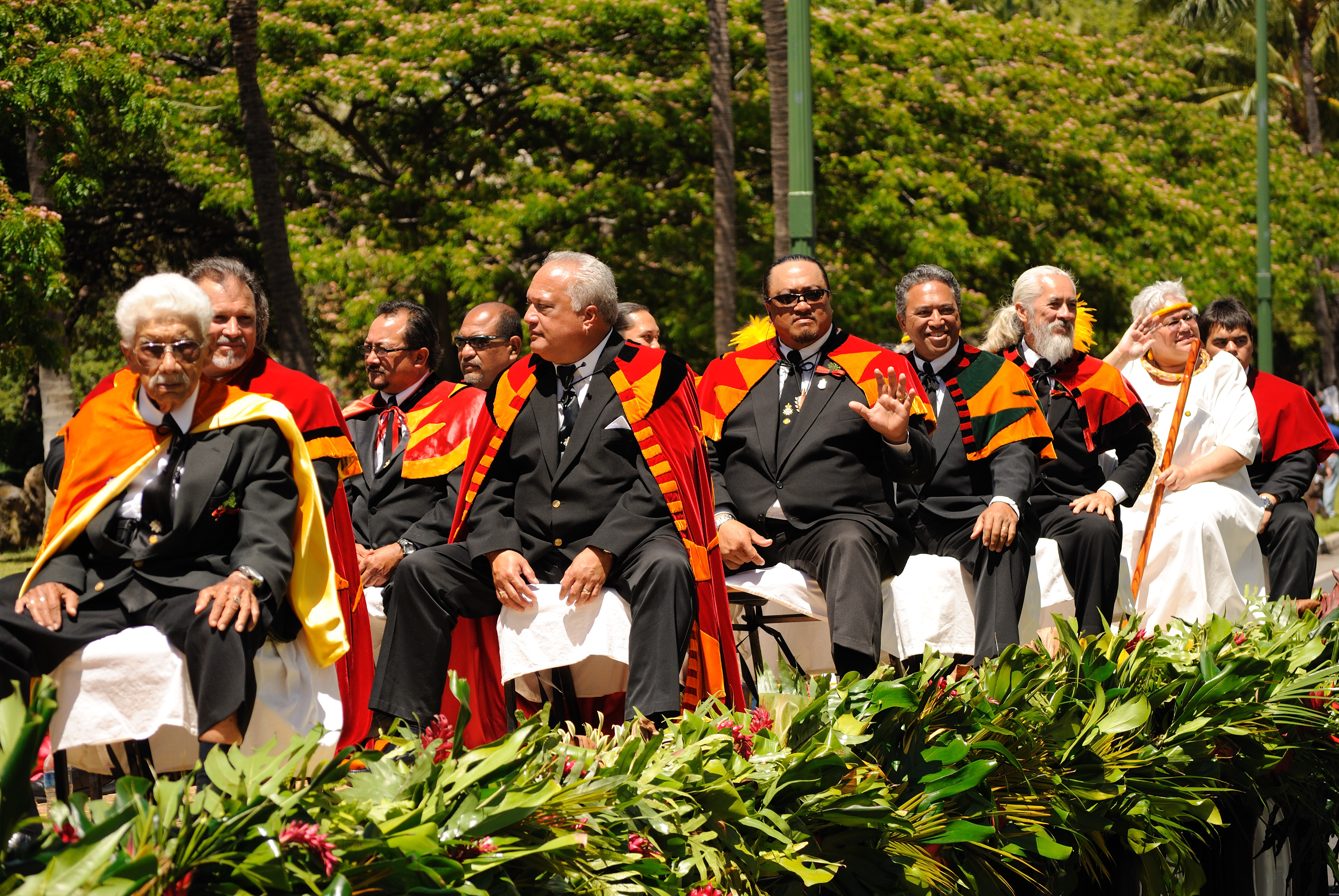
- Members of the Royal Order of Kamehameha I in 2012 - Kamehameha Celebration Floral Parade
- Type: Knightly Order, Dynastic order
- Country: The Kingdom of Hawaii
- Royal house: House of Kamehameha
- Aliʻi Nui: Alika Desha
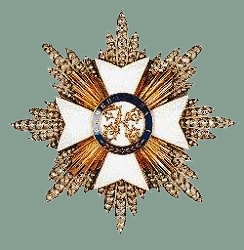
- Star of Knight Grand Cross of the Order of Kamehameha I

Royal Order of Kamehameha I (Kamehameha I e Hookanaka)
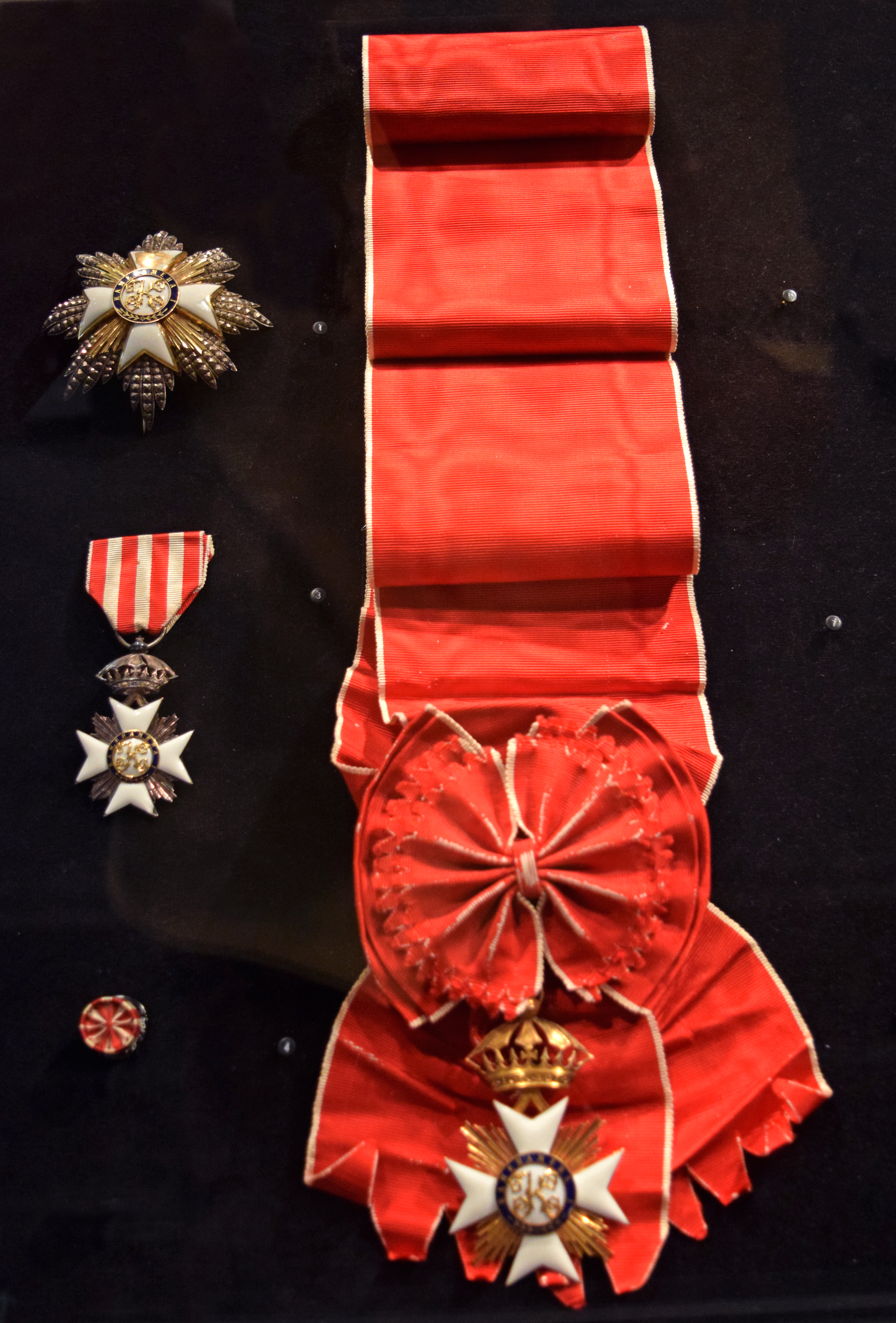
- Badges and sash of the Order
- Country: Kingdom of Hawaiʻi
- Motto: E HOOKANAKA (Order of Fraternity)
- Grades: Knight Grand Cross with Collar; Knight Grand Cross; Knight Commander; Knight Companion

Precedence
- Next (higher): None
- Next (lower): Royal Order of Kalākaua
- Grand Cross and Grand Collar ribbon Commander and Companion ribbon

The Royal Order of Kamehameha I (Hawaiian: Kamehameha I e Hookanaka) is an order of knighthood established by Kamehameha V in 1865, to promote and defend the sovereignty of the Hawaiian Kingdom. Established by the 1864 Constitution, the Order of Kamehameha I is the second order of its kind in Hawaii.

== Grades ==
Appointing a member of the Order was determined by the number of living members in each particular grade. At any given time, there could only be:

- Knight Grand Cross with Collar (CGCOK) – limited to heads of state
- Knight Grand Cross (KGCOK) – 10 individuals
- Knights Commander (KCOK) – 30 individuals
- Knights Companion (KOK) – 50 individuals

== History ==
After Lot Kapuāiwa took the throne as King Kamehameha V, he established, by special decree, created by the privy council using Article 35 of the Constitution the Order of Kamehameha I on April 11, 1865, named to honor his grandfather Kamehameha I. Kamehameha I was the founder of the Kingdom of Hawaii and the House of Kamehameha. Both native Hawaiians and foreigners could be appointed to the Order, in each instance for distinguished service to the king and the people of Hawaiʻi. Upon its inception, it became the first order of the Kingdom of Hawaiʻi actually awarded (the Royal Order of the Cross and Crown was established by King Kamehameha III in 1848 but not awarded until much later). Through the decree of Kamehameha V, the Royal Order of Kamehameha was perpetually created. Its purpose to promote and defend the sovereignty of the Kingdom of Hawaii. It is chartered in the Kingdom of Hawaii by the decree of 1865. Although called "The Royal Order of Kamehameha I" today by the Public, it is known as the "Order of Kamehameha I" by its members, in private.

The Order was awarded 57 times by King Kamehameha V, and 82 times by King Kalākaua. Number of awards in the history of the Order:

- Knights Grand Cross – 40 recipients
- Knight Commander – 56 recipients
- Knight Companion – 43 recipients

Recipients of the Order who resided in the Hawaiian Islands received a yearly salary depending upon their grade: a Knight Grand Cross was entitled to an annual stipend of $250; a Knight Commander, to $150; and a Knight, to $75.

The former Royal House of Keoua maintains a family order also named the Royal Order of Kamehameha I.

== Grand Council ==
The Grand Council of Order, comprising the members of the Order resident in the Hawaiian islands, convened each year. Members absent from the annual meeting without a written message for a valid reason were penalized $20. Among Royal Hawaiian Orders, only this and the Royal Order of Kalākaua I gathered at regular intervals.

== Insignia of the Order ==
The jewel or badge of the Order is a Maltese cross in gold or silver with white enamel, surmounted by the Hawaiian crown. Rays of gold or silver are placed between the arms of the cross. A white-enamelled disc imposed upon the cross bears an elaborate golden "K" at its center; the blue-enamelled band surrounding the disc is inscribed "KAMEHAMEHA I" in golden letters, together with two golden laurel branches. A comparable disc on the reverse of the badge is inscribed "E HOOKANAKA" ("Order of Fraternity", in Hawaiian).

- Knight Grand Cross with Collar: Members of this grade wore the badge of the Order dependent from a golden collar, the decorative links of which alternated the monogram "K" (surrounded by a green-enamelled laurel crown) with the royal crown and a small enamelled badge of the Order. The breast star was identical to that worn by Knights Grands Cross.
- Knight Grand Cross: Knights Grand Cross wore the badge of the Order dependent from a broad red sash, which was edged by a narrow white stripe on each side; the sash was worn over the bearer's right shoulder, its bow (from which the badge, sometimes decorated with brilliants, depended) resting on his left hip. The breast star was an octagonal silver star bearing the uncrowned badge of Order in gold and enamels.
- Knight Commander: Knights Commander wore the badge of the Order dependent from a red neck ribbon, which was edged in white and bore three white stripes.
- Knight: Knights of the Order wore the badge on the left breast, suspended from a ribbon of red and white stripes.
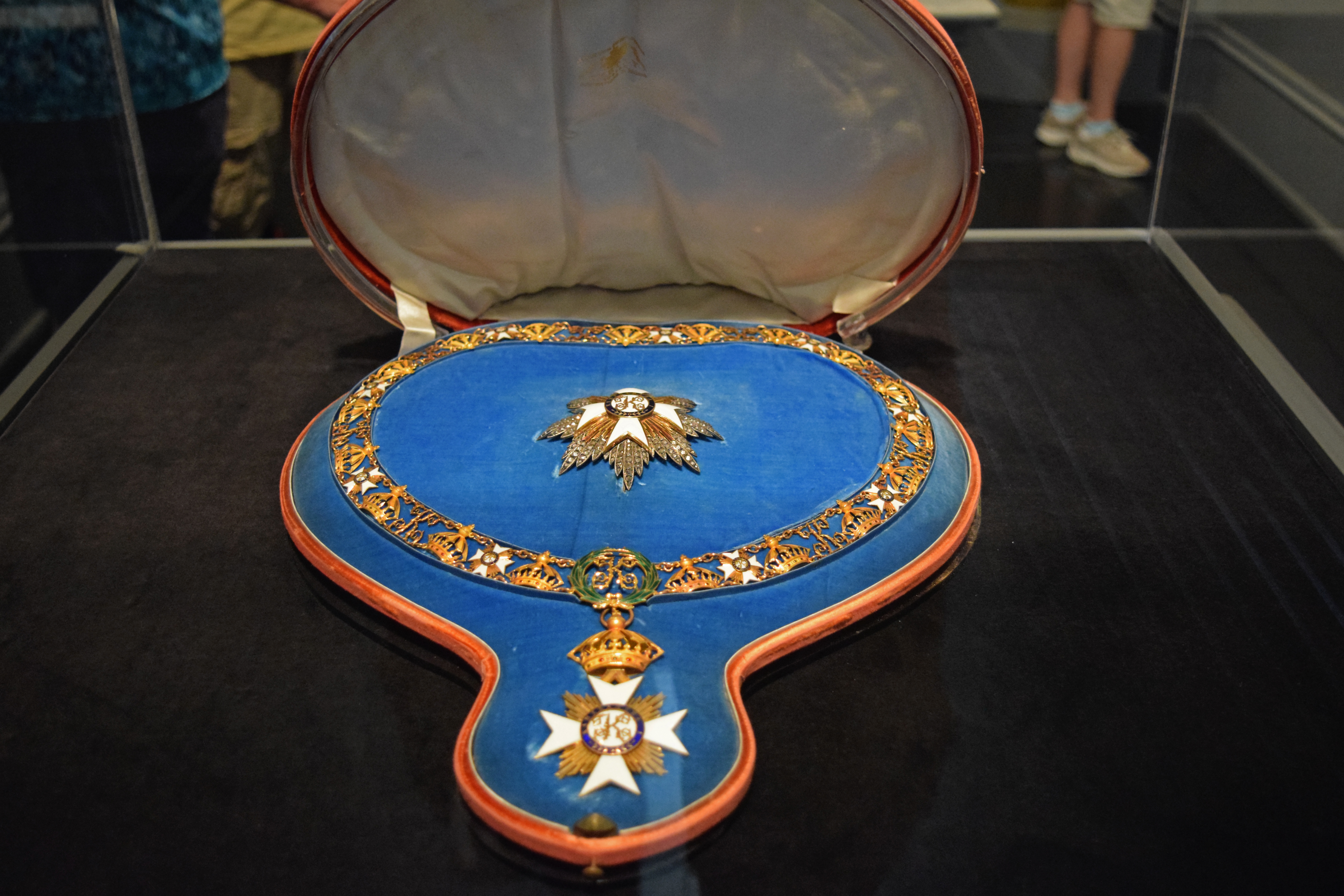
Grand Cross with Collar

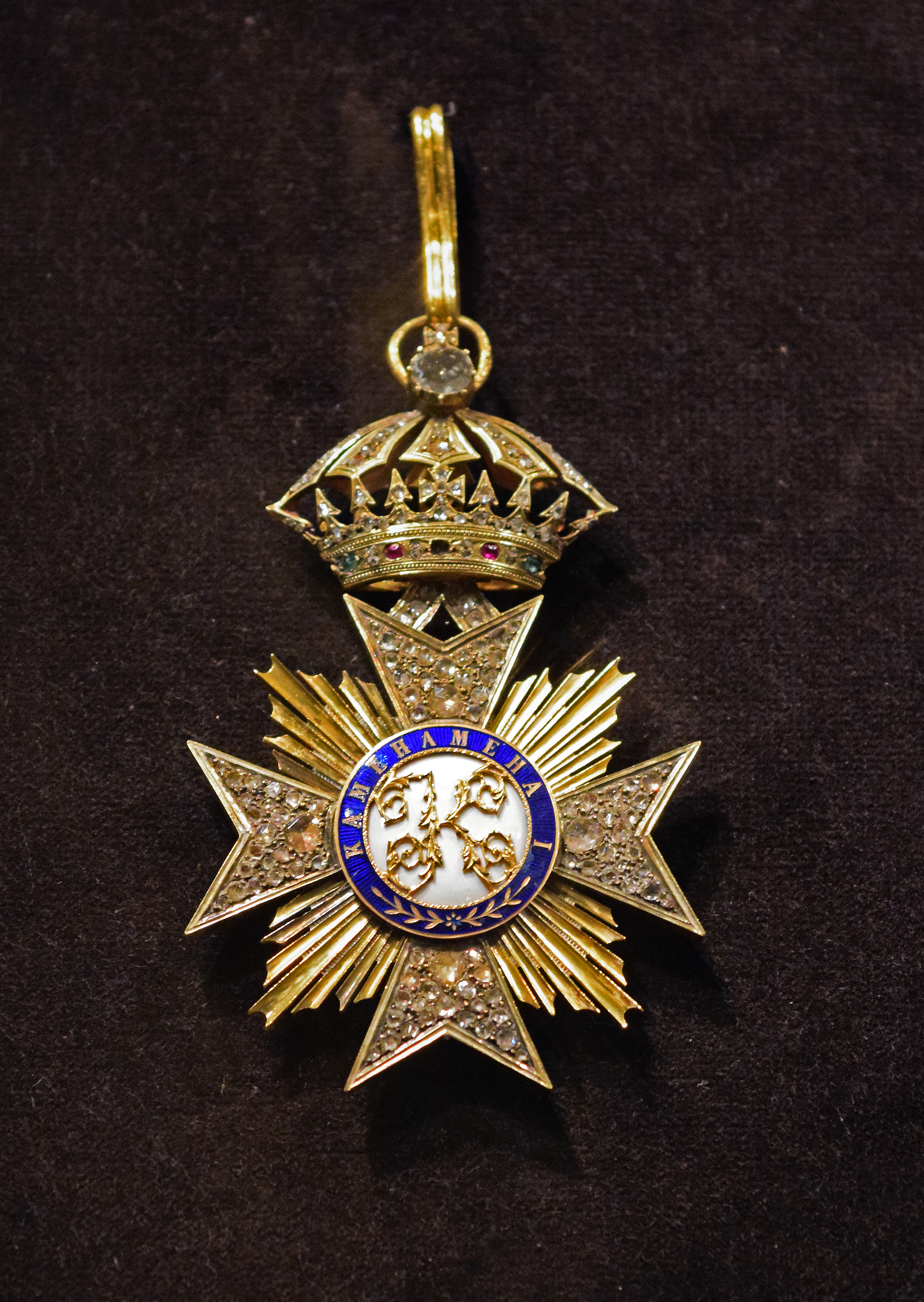
Grand Cross Sash Badge in Brilliants

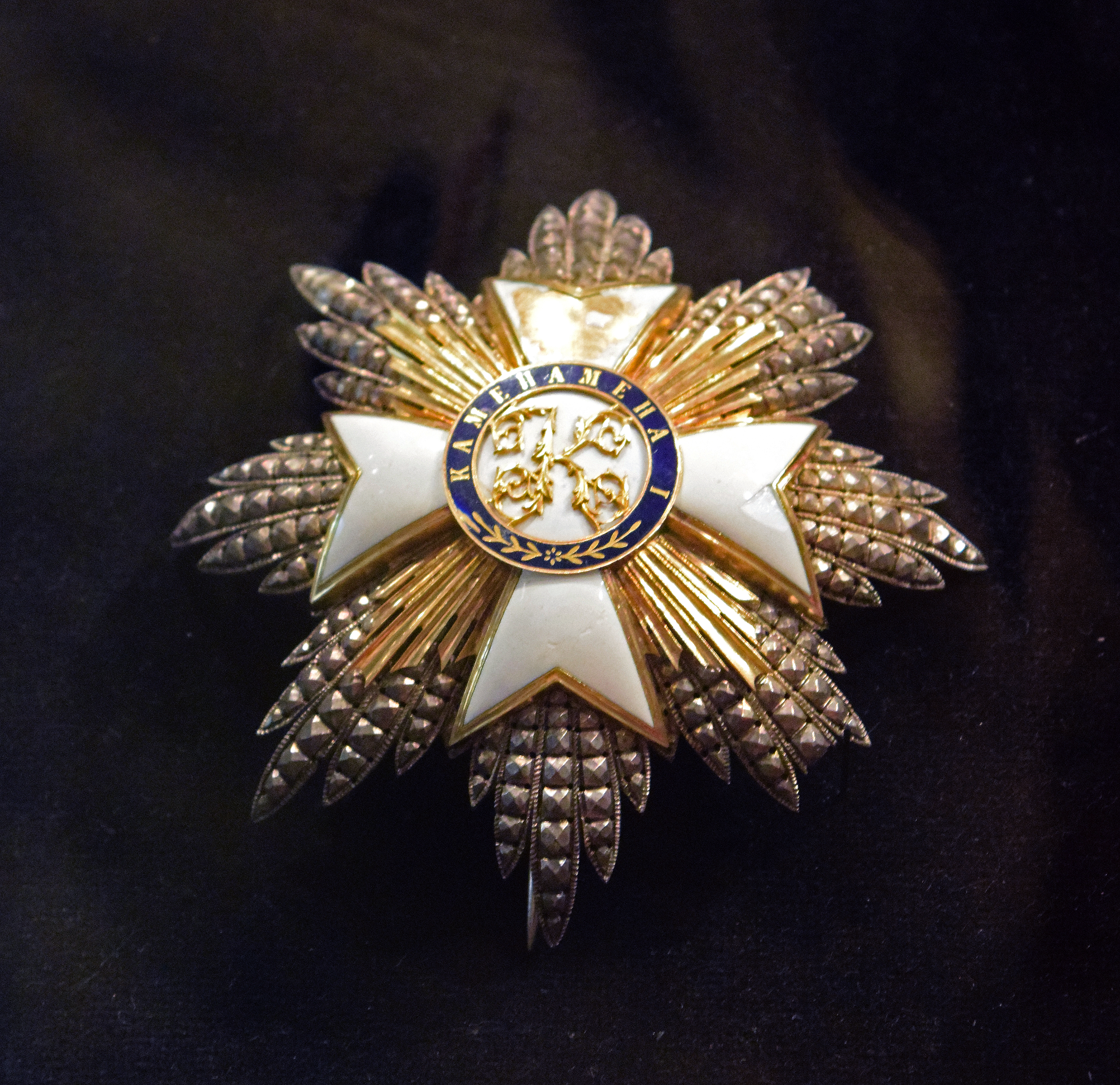
Knights Grand Cross Star

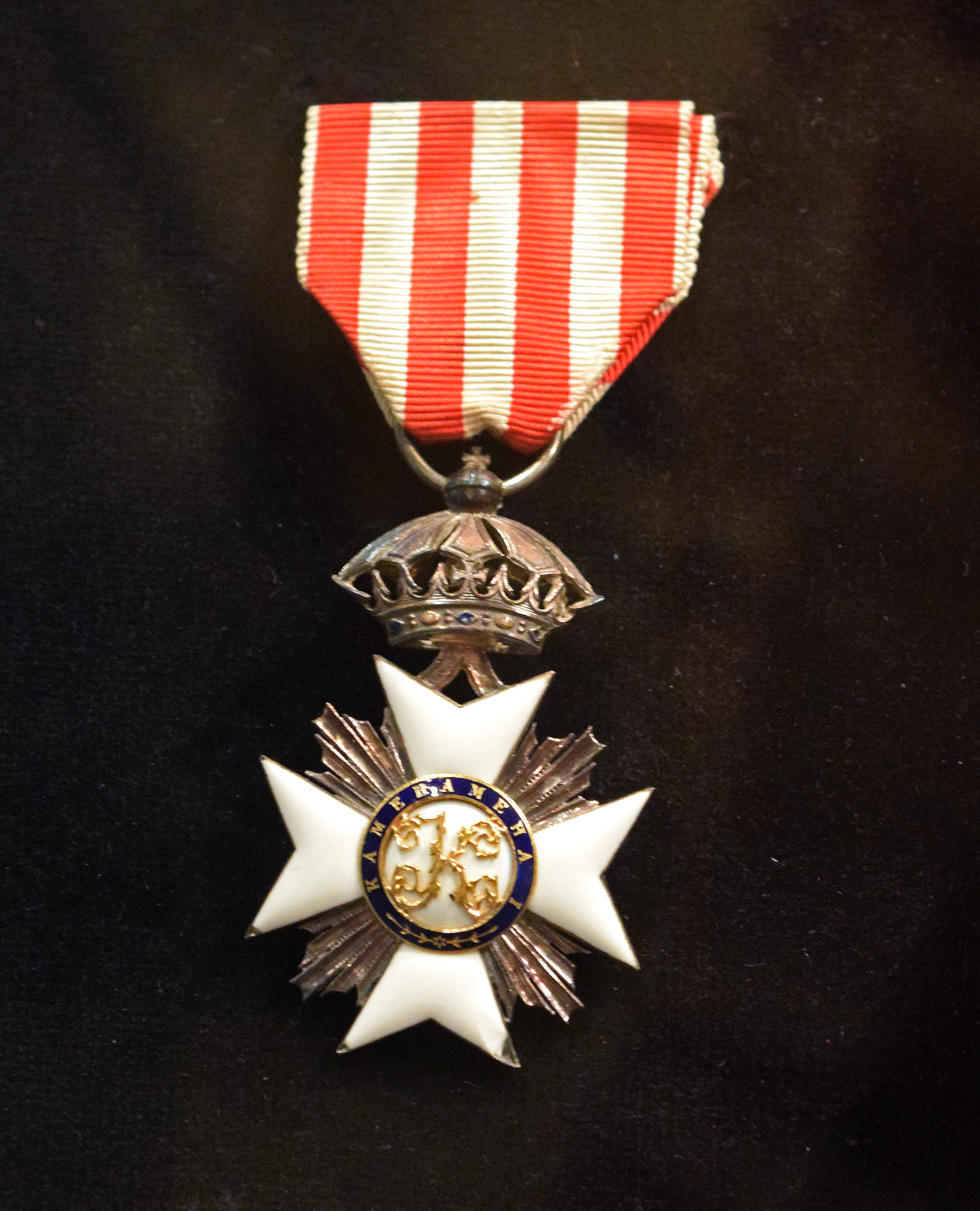
Companion Cross

=== Recipients ===
Among those awarded with Knights Grand cross were:

- Emperor of Russia, Alexander III (1881)
- Queen of the United Kingdom, Victoria (1881)
- Sultan of the Ottoman Empire, Abdul Hamid II (1881)
- German Emperor, King of Prussia, Wilhelm I (1876)
- Emperor of Austria, King of Hungary, Franz Joseph I (1865)
- Emperor of Japan, Meiji (1881)
- King of Siam, Chulalongkorn (1881)
- King of Belgians, Leopold II (1881)
- King of Spain, Alfonso XII (1881)
- Kings of Italy, Victor Emmanuel II (1865) and Umberto I (1878)
- King of Portugal, Luís I (1881)
- Emperor of Qing, Guangxu (1882)
- King of Bavaria, Ludwig II (1865)
- King of Serbia, Milan I (1883)
- King of Romania, Carol I (1882)
- Prince of Orange, Alexander (1881)
- Duke of Genoa, Tommaso (1874)

Recipients of other classes include:

- Albert I of Belgium
- Alfred, Duke of Saxe-Coburg and Gotha
- Christian IX of Denmark
- Kalama
- Keʻelikōlani
- Leleiohoku II
- Likelike
- Liliʻuokalani
- John J. Almy
- George Belknap
- Bernice Pauahi Bishop
- Charles Reed Bishop
- Archibald Scott Cleghorn
- John Owen Dominis
- Thomas George Fermor-Hesketh
- Abraham Fornander
- Charles Hastings Judd
- Victoria Kamāmalu
- Charles Kanaʻina
- John Mahiʻai Kāneakua
- Paul Kanoa
- Paul P. Kanoa
- John Mākini Kapena
- Elizabeth Kekaʻaniau
- Victoria Kinoiki Kekaulike
- William Luther Moehonua
- Paul Nahaolelua
- Anton von Petz
- George Morison Robertson
- Prince Fushimi Sadanaru
- Joseph S. Skerrett
- Prince Arisugawa Taruhito
- Henry Thatcher
- William M. Wherry
- Alfred Willis
- Prince Kitashirakawa Yoshihisa

The Knights Grand Cross with Collar was awarded on two occasions, to Queen Victoria of the United Kingdom and to Emperor Meiji of Japan.

== Today ==
The purpose of the Royal Order of Kamehameha I, as it is known today, is to unite men of Hawaiian descent in fraternal and benevolent work, good moral character, and sound bodily health; to cultivate the cardinal principles of friendship, charity and benevolence; to aid widows and orphans; to improve the social and moral conditions of its members; to provide scholarship assistance; to preserve and perpetuate the ancient culture, customs, and traditions of ancient Hawaiʻi, uplift the Hawaiian people; infuse the spirit of patriotism, loyalty, helpfulness and kindness among its members; advance the interest of its members in every rightful cause, and to encourage and develop leadership.

Today the order has nine Chapters:

- Moku O Hawaiʻi (Central Oʻahu)
- Moku O Mãmalahoa (Hilo, Hawaiʻi)
- Moku O Kaumualiʻi (Kauaʻi)
- Moku O Kahekili (Maui)
- Moku O Kalaniana’ole (Molokaʻi)(Inactive)
- Moku O Kuhio (Windward Oʻahu)
- Moku O Kona (Kona, Hawaiʻi)
- Moku O Kapuaiwa (Leeward Oʻahu)
- Moku O Kohala (Kohala, Hawai'i)
- Moku O Puna (Puna, Hawai'i)

The last remaining original meeting hall of the order, located at 1162 Kalanianaole Avenue in the Keaukaha community of Hilo, Hawaii, was added to the National Register of Historic Places on May 20, 1993.

The Royal Order of Kamehameha I continues its work in observance and preservation of some native Hawaiian rituals and customs established by the leaders of the Kingdom of Hawaiʻi. It is often consulted by the U.S. government, state of Hawaiʻi and the various county governments of Hawaiʻi in native Hawaiian-sensitive rites performed at state functions.
