= Royal Hawaiian Agricultural Society Medal =

- Location: Honolulu
- Country: Kingdom of Hawaii
- Presented by: Royal Hawaiian Agricultural Society
- Status: Obsolete
- Established: 1850s

The Royal Hawaiian Agricultural Society Medal is a silver medal which was issued by the Royal Hawaiian Agricultural Society, which was active in the Kingdom of Hawaii in the 1850s. The Society presented the medal annually to the best in each category of a juried exhibition of Hawaiian agricultural products.

The medals were ordered by the Society through the agency of a Mr. Marshall of Massachusetts. At the Society's request, Marshall contacted James Ross Snowden, director of the United States Mint, who forwarded the request to the Department of the Treasury. The request was approved with the stipulation that the medals were to be made after regular Mint hours. The number of specimens minted is unknown.

== The medal ==
The face (obverse) of the medal includes symbols of agricultural enterprise in the Hawaiian Islands - sugar and coffee - and implements and vehicles of trade - the plow and tall ships; the eastern sun is rising in the background, with a palm to the left and royal crown above all. The inscription around the edge reads "Royal Hawaiian Agricultural Society, Established A.D. 1850." The reverse has a wreath surrounded by the inscription "Premium for the best exhibited" with a center field for prize category and awardee's name. It is made from silver and white metal, 64.5 mm, thick, approximately 82 grams, with dies engraved by Francis N. Mitchell.

In 2006, three examples with variations on the reverse were presented for auction by Doyle New York:

- Blank - unissued, from the collection of Samuel Mills Damon.
- "Imported" inscription - depiction of a fenced-in area containing a wood shed, and in the foreground - a boar feeding at a trough. In the background are three palm trees and a figure, wearing a wide brimmed hat, looking over the fence. In the far background is the profile of Diamond Head. Also from the collection of Samuel Mills Damon.
- "Syrup TO Brewer Plantation" inscription. Lacquered medal awarded to C. Brewer & Co. Plantation, one of the Big Five plantations, for best syrup.
