= Royal Order of the Crown of Hawaii =

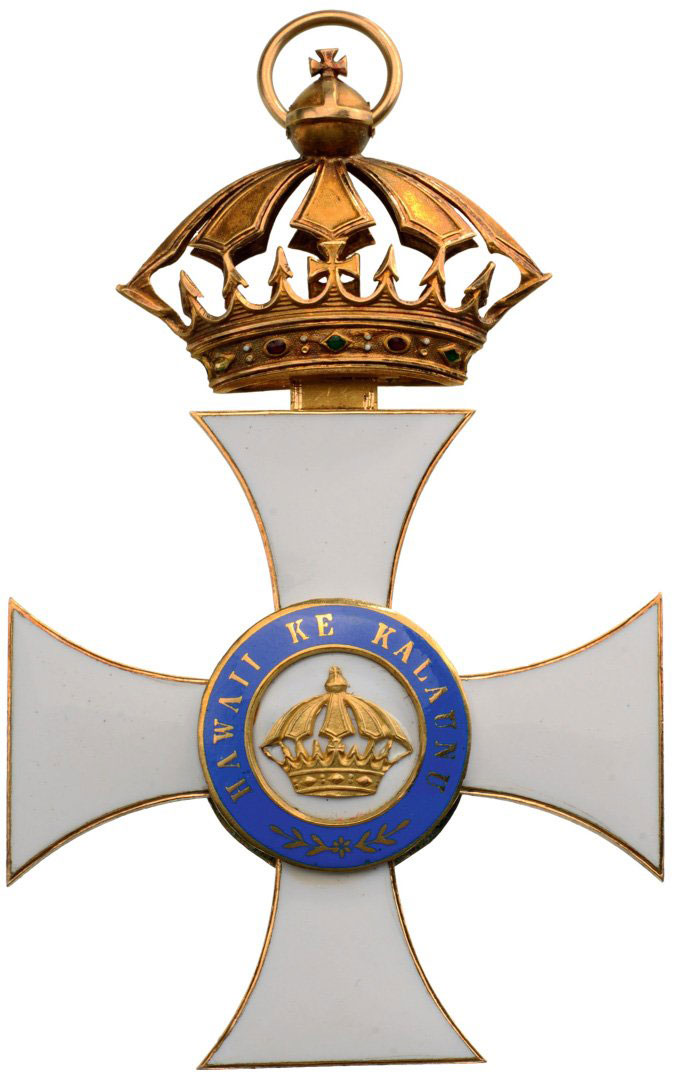

Awarded by The Monarch of the Kingdom of Hawai'i
- Established: 1848
- Country: Kingdom of Hawaii
- Motto: Onipaʻa
- Awarded for: loyalty towards the crown of Hawaii
- Status: Dynastic Order
- Founder: Kamehameha III
- Grand cross ribbon

Royal Order of the Crown of Hawaii is an order founded in 1848 by king Kamehameha III to commemorate his ascension to the throne. It is considered the first order of the kingdom of Hawaii.

The order is bestowed upon people for loyalty and meritorious service for the crown of Hawaii, or for merits on the field of culture and education.

The order is awarded in seven different classes:

- Grand Cross
- Grand Officer
- Commander
- Officer
- Companion
- Gold medal
- Silver medal
