= Royal Order of Kalākaua =

Hawaiian order of merit (1873–1893)

Royal Order of Kalākaua I Kalākaua I e Hookanaka
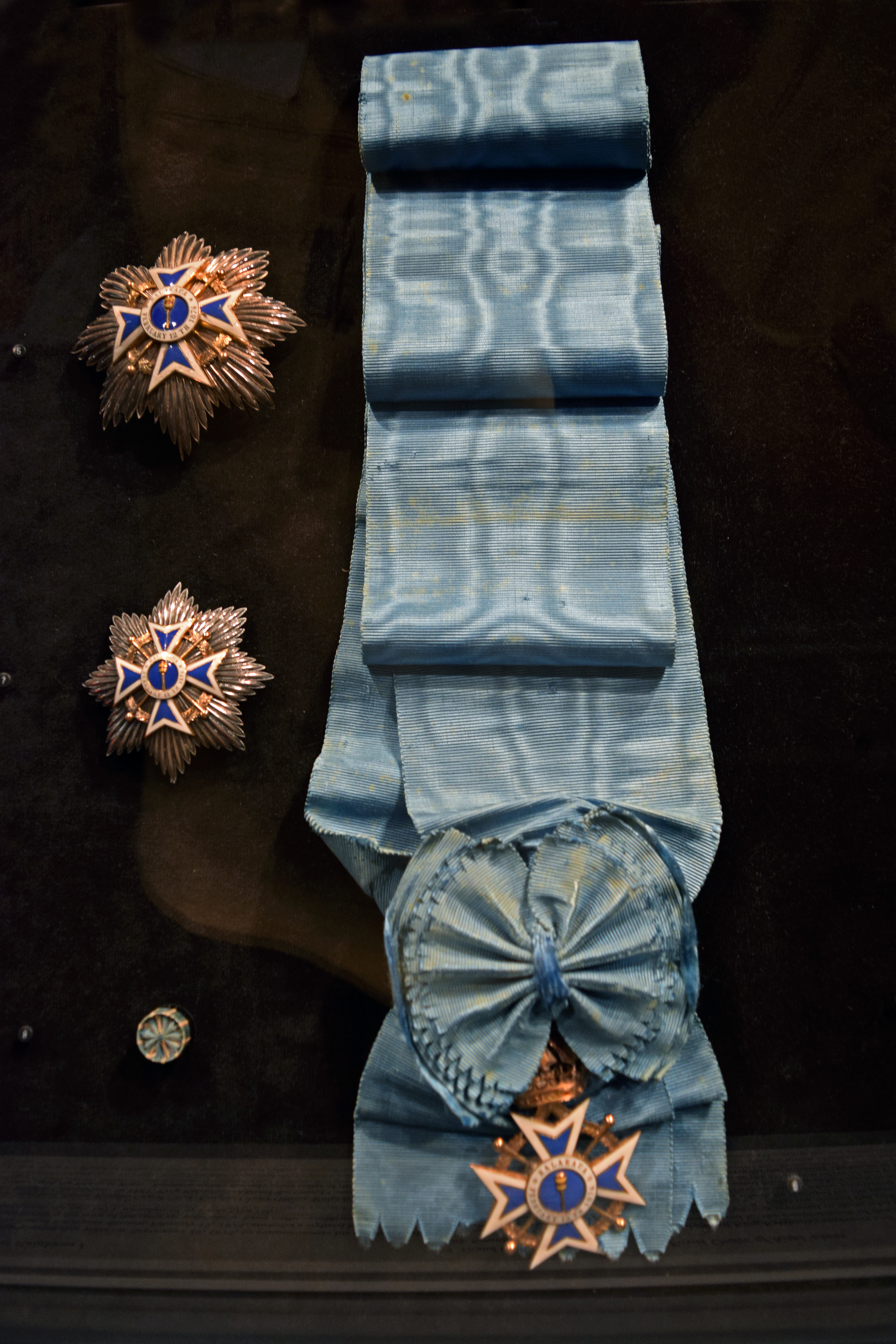
- Badge and sash of the Order
- Type: Order of merit
- Country: Kingdom of Hawaiʻi
- Grades: Knight Grand Cross with Collar; Knight Grand Cross; Grand Officer; Commander; Companion

Precedence
- Next (higher): Royal Order of Kamehameha I
- Next (lower): Royal Order of Kapiolani
- Grand Cross ribbon Grand Officer, Commander, and Companion ribbon

The Royal Order of Kalākaua I (Kalākaua I e Hookanaka) was instituted on 28 September 1874 by King Kalākaua I to commemorate his accession to the throne of the Kingdom of Hawaiʻi on 12 February 1874.

== Grades ==
The Order was awarded in four grades with an additional superior class:

- Knights Grand Cross - 12 individuals
- Grand Officer - 20 individuals
- Commander - 50 individuals
- Companion - 60 individuals

The Knights Grand Cross with Collar was only given for head of states. Granting the insignia and awards of the Order was determined by the number of living members of the Order.

== History ==
The Royal Order of Kalākaua I was instituted on 28 September 1874 by King Kalākaua I to commemorate his accession to the throne of the Kingdom of Hawaiʻi on 12 February 1874. This order was granted to both native Hawaiians and foreigners for superlative service to the monarch and to the kingdom. It was last conferred by Queen Liliʻuokalani on 1 August 1892; in 1893, the Order became abeyant.

In the duration of the Order, it was granted 239 times by King Kalākaua I, and 15 times by his sister Queen Liliʻuokalani.

Number of awards in the history of the Order:

- Knights Grand Cross - 38 recipients
- Grand Officer Star - 49 recipients
- Commander Cross - 95 recipients
- Companion Cross - 73 recipients

== Annuity ==
Recipients of the Order who were residents in the Hawaiian islands received a yearly salary depending upon their grade: $150 for the Knights Grand Cross, $125 for the Grand Officer Star, $100 for the Commander Cross and $50 for the Knight.

== Grand Council ==
The Grand Council of Order, which consists of the Order's Cavaliers resident on the Hawaiian islands, convened yearly on 12 February. Members absent from the annual meeting and without a written message stating as such without a valid reason, were penalized $20. Of all the Royal Hawaiian Orders, only this one and the Royal Order of Kamehameha I gathered at regular intervals.

== Insignia of the Order ==
The badge of the order is a Maltese cross in gold or silver with Prussian blue and white enamel, surmounted by a Hawaiian crown. The arms of the cross have a border strip of white enamel, the center being blue - separated by a thin band of gold or silver. A gold or silver wreath and a pūloʻuloʻu (kapu sticks - ball and stick insignia) is found between the arms connecting them. On the cross is a blue and white enamel locket. On a white strip, the inscription KALAKAUA FEBRUARY 12 1874 circles a kāhili (feathered standard of royalty) on a background of blue. The reverse comprises a locket of blue and white. At the center of the locket is the date 1874, surrounded by the inscription KEOLA (eternal life) - both in gold.

Knights Grand Cross with Collar: The insignia are a collar chain and a breast star. The collar chain is composed of alternating monograms "K.I.K." and kahili of red and yellow enamel. The central component of the chain, from which is hung the badge of the Order, is the monogram "K.I.K." surrounded by a gold wreath. The breast star is identical to that of the Knights Grands Cross, as detailed below.

Knights Grand Cross: The insignia of the Knights Grand cross comprises a breast star, the badge of the Order and a grand cordon sash. The breast star is an octagonal silver star, to which is affixed the badge of Order without the crown - in gold. The sash is deep blue. The badge of the Order is fastened to a bow on the sash on a bow, resting on the left hip.

Grand Officer: The insignia of Grand Officer Star is only a breast star. Initially, the size of the cross affixed to the star was smaller than that of the Knights Grand Cross; however, from 1879 onwards, both were identical in size. The wreath of Grand Officer Star is silver.

Commander: The insignia of the Commander Cross is identical to that of the Grand Officer Star, except it is worn on a neck ribbon of five alternating white and blue stripes.

Companion: The Companion Cross comprises a breast badge suspended by a ribbon of white and blue stripes.

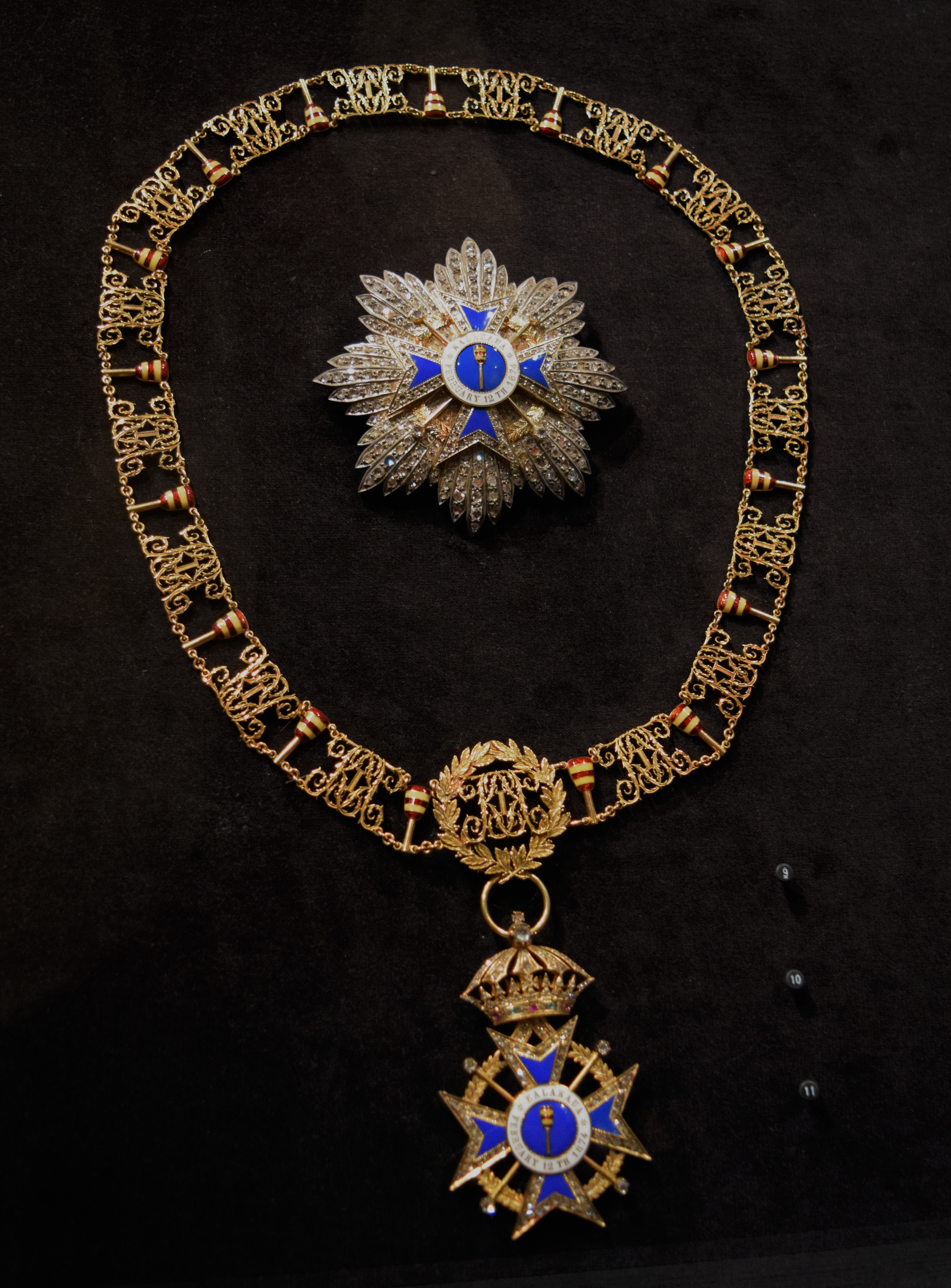
Grand Cross with Collar

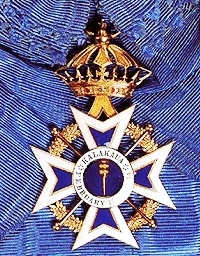
Knights Grand Cross Sash Badge

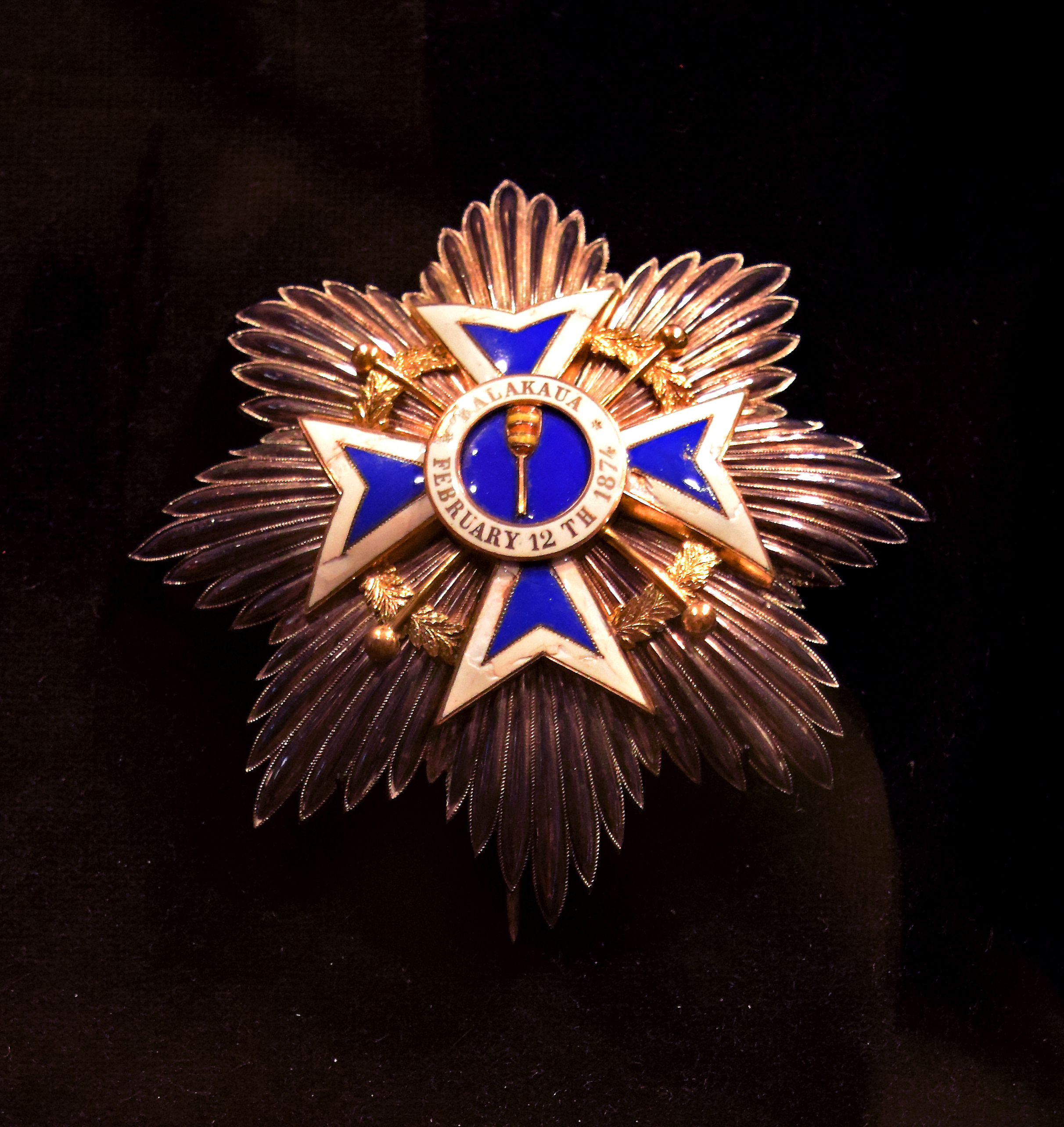
Knights Grand Cross Star

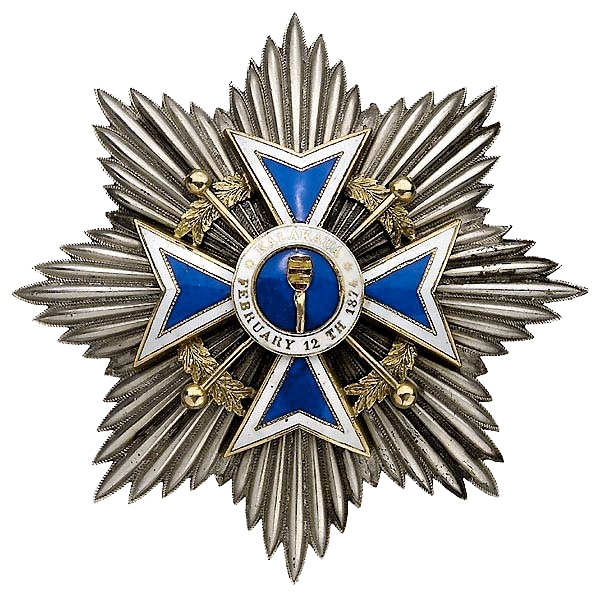
Grand Officer Star

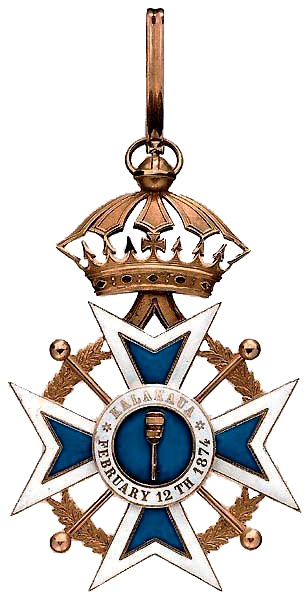
Commander Cross Sash Badge

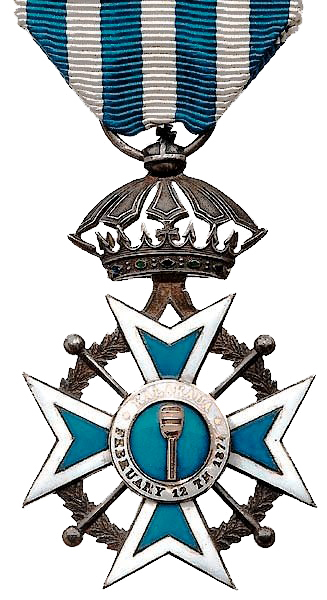
Companion Cross

== Recipients ==
Among those awarded with Knights Grand Cross were:

- Emperor of Austria-Hungary, Franz Joseph I (1878)
- King of Serbia, Milan I Obrenović (1882)
- Prince of Wales, Albert Edward (1881)
- Khedive of Egypt and Sudan, Tewfik Pasha (1881)
- Bey of Tunis, Muhammad III as-Sadiq (1881)
- Vatican Secretary of State, Luigi Jacobini (1881)
- President of France, Marie François Sadi Carnot (1889)
- President of Venezuela, Antonio Guzmán Blanco (1878)
- Presidents of Mexico, Manuel González and José de la Cruz Porfirio Díaz Mori (both 1884)

The Knights Grand Cross with Collar was bestowed twice in the Order's history, both times by King Kalākaua I, first to the Prince of Wales, Albert Edward, and second to King Kalākaua I by himself.
