= John Dominis Holt II =

Hawaii official (1861–1915)

John Dominis Holt
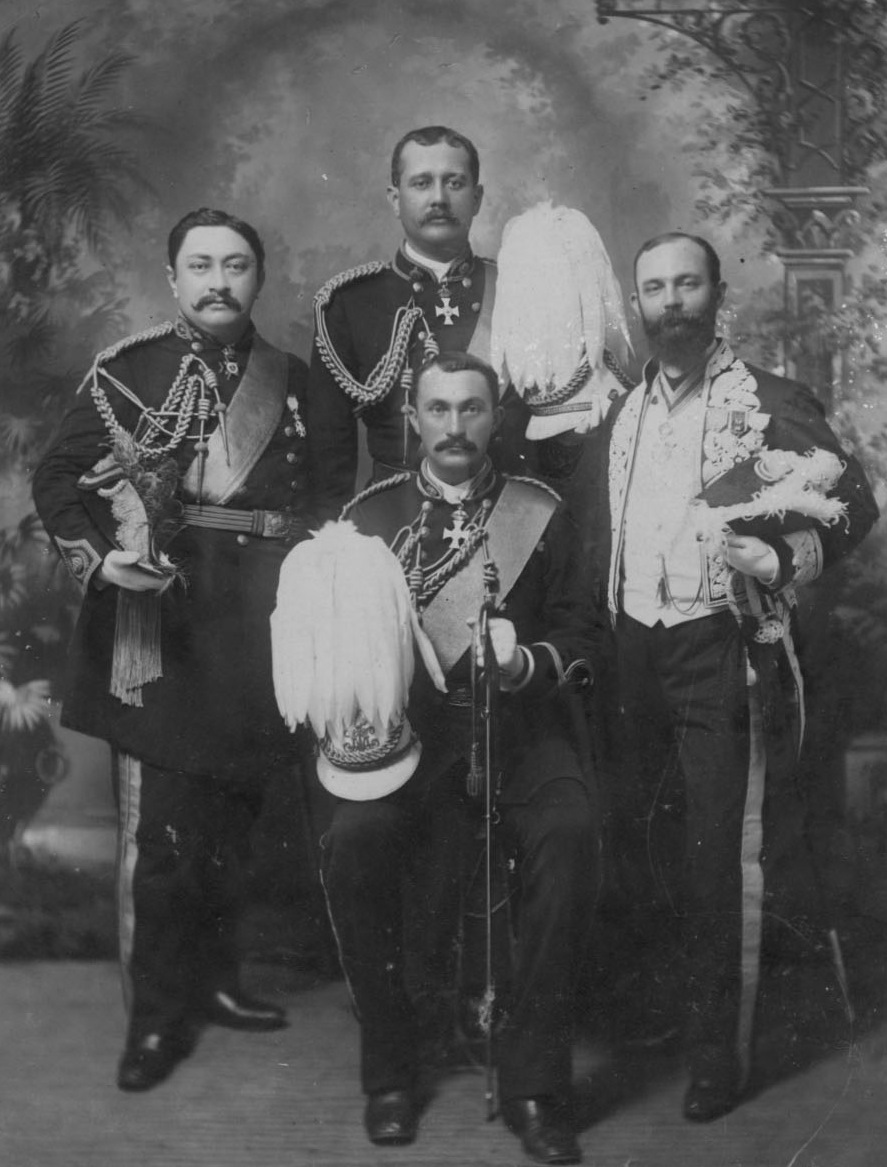
- Col. John Dominis Holt (center) with other members of Queen Liliuokalani's Staff: Col. James Harbottle Boyd, Col. Henry Franz Bertelmann, Col. James W. Robertson, Her Majesty's Chamberlain
- Born: March 17, 1861; Honolulu, Oahu, Hawaiian Kingdom
- Died: December 23, 1915 (aged 54); Wailuku, Maui, Territory of Hawaii
- Burial place: Oahu Cemetery
- Spouse: Emma Daniels
- Military career
- Allegiance: United Kingdom; Hawaiian Kingdom
- Branch: Governor of Oahu's Staff; His Majesty's Staff; Her Majesty's Staff
- Service years: 1884–1893
- Rank: Colonel, Major

Colonel John Dominis Kauikeaouli Holt II (March 17, 1861 – December 23, 1915) was an official holding the rank of major and colonel within the Hawaiian Kingdom. After the American annexation of Hawaii, he became an early member of the Democratic Party of Hawaii.

== Life and career ==
He was born March 17, 1861, in Honolulu, to Owen Jones Holt (1842–1891) and Hanakaulani o Kamāmalu Holt (1843–1904). His grandfather Robert William Holt was originally from Warwickshire and Liverpool. Holt, himself, was of mixed Native Hawaiian, Tahitian and English descent, known as a hapa haole in Hawaiian. According to family tradition, his paternal great-grandmother was the daughter of a Tahitian chiefess and Lucien Bonaparte, the younger brother of French Emperor Napoleon, while his mother was the illegitimate daughter of British Admiral Lord George Paulet and granddaughter of Kamehameha I. He was named after his uncle John Dominis Holt I, who was named after Captain John Dominis, the father of Prince Consort John Owen Dominis, the husband of Queen Liliuokalani. The Holt family were relations of the Dominises through Mary Jones Dominis, whose sister was his grandfather's first wife.

Holt initially worked as a teacher at ʻIolani School before gaining royal favor. Due to his family connection, Holt served many positions in the royal inner circle of the Hawaiian Kingdom during the reign of King Kalākaua. On December 23, 1884, he was appointed as a major on the Governor of Oahu's Staff under John Owen Dominis, He was appointed on October 4, 1886, as secretary and aide-de-camp to Dominis in his capacity as lieutenant general and commander-in-chief. He later served on the military staff of King Kalākaua from 1889 to 1891. He served on the staff of Queen Liliuokalani and was elevated to the rank of colonel on March 14, 1891. Holt was described as a cavalier, a court favorite with social grace and an excellent horseman.

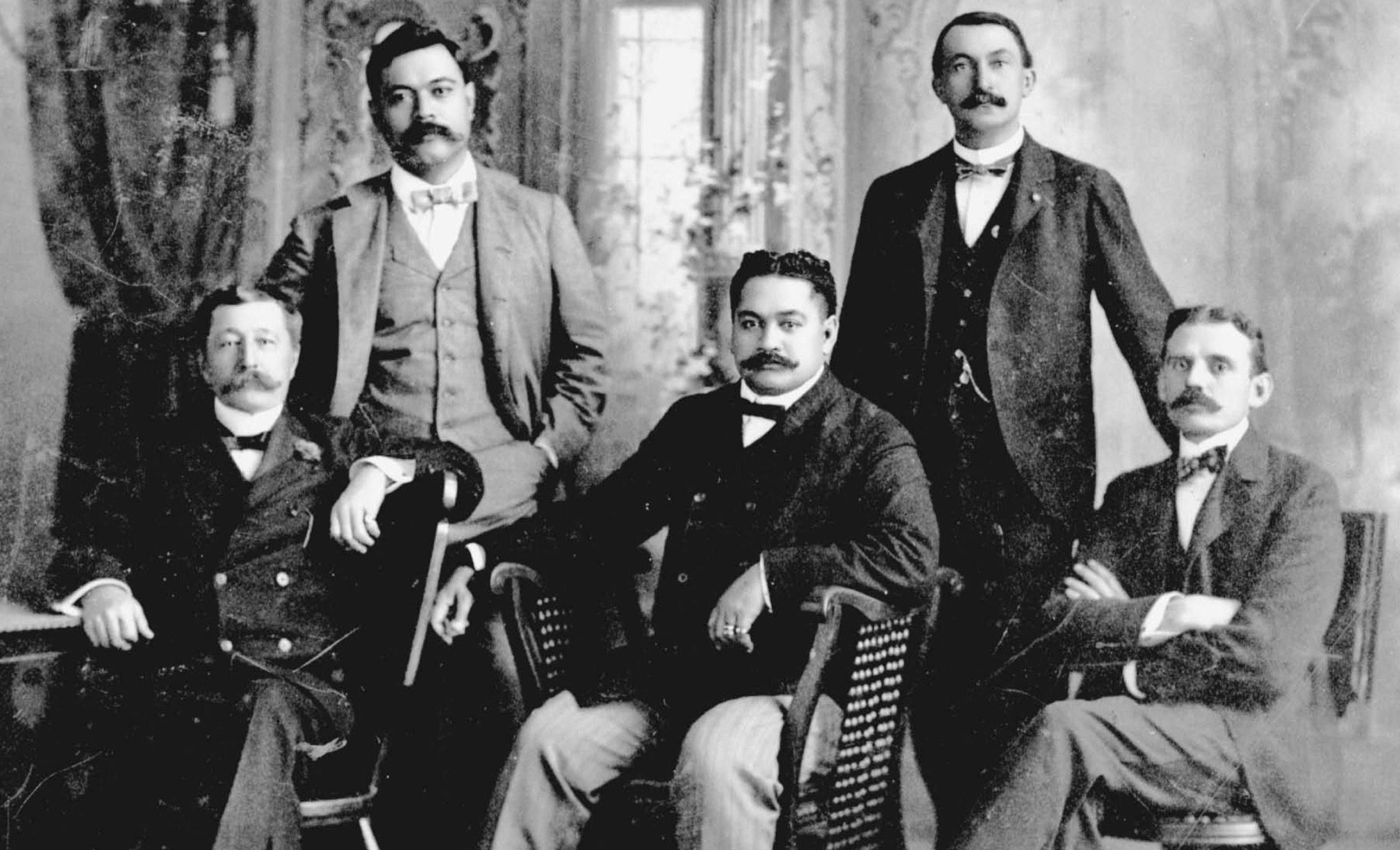
The Hawaiian Democratic Delegation, 1900.

After the overthrow of the Hawaiian Kingdom and the annexation of Hawaii to the United States, Holt became involved in the liquor business and was regarded as "a prosperous business man and loyal Hawaiian". Holt also served as an early member of the Democratic Party of Hawaii. With former Hawaiian royal Prince David Kawānanakoa, he served as a delegate to the 1900 Democratic National Convention in Kansas City, Missouri, in which William Jennings Bryan was nominated. Between 1904 and 1917, he also served on the Board of Registration for the island of Oahu. He died on December 23, 1915, at the home of his son John at Wailuku on the island of Maui. Holt is buried at Oahu Cemetery in Honolulu.

== Personal life ==
He married Emma Daniels (1857–1906), daughter of Henry Wilson Daniels, the English-born circuit judge of Maui, and the British-Hawaiian Nancy Hannah Kamaekalani Copp. They had many children and their descendants include his grandson John Dominis Holt IV.

== Bibliography ==
- Holt, John Dominis; Sinesky, Alice (1987). "John Dominis Holt". Watumull Foundation Oral History Project. 16. Honolulu. hdl:10524/48676. OCLC 663425247.
- Holt, John Dominis (1974). On Being Hawaiian. Honolulu: Topgallant Publishing Company. ISBN 978-0-914916-23-9. OCLC 1231853.
- Holt, John Dominis (1993). Recollections: Memoirs of John Dominis Holt, 1919–1935. Honolulu: Ku Paʻa. ISBN 978-0-681-02783-1. OCLC 30886291.
- "Paradise of the Pacific". Vol. 75. Honolulu: Press Publishing Co. 1963. OCLC 6372692.
- Taylor, Clarice B. (1954). Holt, Lisa Ululani (ed.). The Fabulous Holt. Honolulu: Honolulu Star-Bulletin. Archived from the original on December 8, 2016.
- Van Dyke, Jon M. (2008). Who Owns the Crown Lands of Hawaiʻi?. Honolulu: University of Hawaii Press. ISBN 978-0-8248-6560-3. OCLC 257449971 – via Project MUSE.
