= John Dominis Holt IV =

American Hawaiian historian, poet (1919–1993)

- Born: June 4, 1919; Honolulu, Territory of Hawaii (now United States)
- Died: March 29, 1993 (aged 73); Honolulu, Hawaii, United States
- Resting place: Oahu Cemetery
- Education: Sacramento Junior College, George Washington University, Columbia University
- Occupations: Writer, publisher, poet, Hawaiian cultural historian
- Spouses: Fredda Burwell (m.? –1972; her death), Frances Patches McKinnon Damon
- Children: 3
- Awards: Living Treasures of Hawaiʻi (1979)

John Dominis Holt IV (June 4, 1919 – March 29, 1993) was an American and Native Hawaiian writer, poet and cultural historian. In 1979, he was recognized as a Living Treasures of Hawaiʻi for his contribution to the Hawaiian Renaissance.

== Family ==
He was born June 4, 1919, in Honolulu, to John Dominis Holt III (1885–1950) and May Ellen Bailey (1892–1975). His paternal grandfather was Colonel John Dominis Holt II, an officer of King Kalākaua and Queen Liliuokalani's military staff. From his mother, he descended from Hawaiian missionary and artist Edward Bailey. Holt was of mixed Native Hawaiian, Tahitian and English descent, known as a hapa haole in Hawaiian. According to family tradition, his ancestors included Hawaiian and Tahitian royalty. Other ancestors include Lucien Bonaparte, the younger brother of French Emperor Napoleon, and British Admiral Lord George Paulet. By the time of his generation, the wealth and social standing of the family were long gone; but he spent his youth surrounded by older generations who loved to tell their memories of the monarchy. These traditional stories inspired his later writing as an adult.

His first marriage was to Fredda Burwell (1904–1972), an artist from New York. After her death in 1972, he remarried to Frances Patches McKinnon Damon, a granddaughter of Samuel Mills Damon. They adopted three children: Allison, Melanie, and Daniel. He worked as a landscape designer and contractor.

== Literary career ==
Holt was educated Punahou School (briefly), Kamehameha Schools and graduated from President Theodore Roosevelt High School in Honolulu.

For college, he attended Sacramento Junior College in Sacramento, California; and George Washington University in Washington, D.C., and from 1943 to 1946 he attended Columbia University but never acquired a degree. He lived in New York City for some time before returning to Hawaii with his first wife Fredda Burwell. He worked as a landscape designer and contractor.

Holt is known mainly for his literary work. He wrote many books on the subject of Hawaiian history and culture. His works include writings about Hawaiian featherwork, family heritage and genealogy. The spirit of old Hawaii that he learned from family traditions and childhood tales of the monarchy became incorporated into the stories he wrote as an adult. In 1964, his essay "On Being Hawaiian" inspired the rise of the Second Hawaiian Renaissance movement. Holt brought pride back to the Hawaiian self-identity after decades of shame and negative stereotypes. Through his writings, Hawaii saw a revival in traditional Hawaiian culture, art and language. Below is an excerpt from this essay:

Statistically I am part-Hawaiian; although I was reminded one night at a dinner party by a charming, mathematically astute lady, who descends from two prominent early missionary couples, that I am actually three-eighths Hawaiian by blood. All four of my grandparents were part-Polynesian: two actually fifty-percent white and fifty-percent Hawaiian; one who was a mixture of Tahitian, Hawaiian and white; and the fourth, one-quarter Hawaiian and three-quarters white…. My ancestors here included a Spanish rancher; a part-Corsican, part-Tahitian alii woman; an American missionary couple originally from Holden, Massachusetts; a British earl; a Boston businessman; and Hawaiians from both the high-ranking and the lesser, the kau-kau alii, who came originally from the islands of Maui and Hawaii. I am, in depth, a product of Hawaii–an American, yes, who is a citizen of the fiftieth State, but I am also a Hawaiian; somewhat by blood, and in large measure by sentiment. Of this, I am proud.

— John Dominis Holt, "On Being Hawaiian"

Holt worked as a publisher for Topgallant Publishing Company and was a trustee for the Bernice Pauahi Bishop Museum. He was one of the earliest contemporary Hawaiian novelists. He and his second wife Patches worked as activists in the Hawaiian community, fighting against rapid development on the island of Oahu. They were also patrons of the arts. In 1979, he was recognized as a Living Treasures of Hawaiʻi. In 1985, Holt was awarded the Hawai‘i Award for Literature by Governor John David Waiheʻe III.

Holt died on March 29, 1993. He was buried in Oahu Cemetery in Honolulu. The John Dominis Holt Award for Excellence in Publishing, named in his honor, is awarded annually by Hawaii Book Publishers Association to an individual for their lifetime contribution to Hawaiian literature and book-publishing. In 2001, John Dominis and Patches Damon Holt Gallery at the Honolulu Academy of Arts was named after Holt and his second wife.

== Works ==
- Whitman, John B.; Holt, John Dominis; Peabody Museum of Salem (1979). An Account of the Sandwich Islands: the Hawaiian Journal of John B. Whitman, 1813–1815. Honolulu: Topgallant Publishing Company; Salem, MS: Peabody Museum of Salem. OCLC 6648942.
- Holt, John Dominis (1985). The Art of Featherwork in Old Hawaiʻi. Honolulu: Topgallant Publishing Company. ISBN 978-0-914916-68-0. OCLC 13165036.
- Holt, John Dominis (1971). Art in Ancient Hawaii. OCLC 663391783.
- Holt, John Dominis (1961). Hale Hoike-ike: The Story of a House. Honolulu. OCLC 7017957.
- Holt, John Dominis; McGregor, Davianna Pōmaikaʻi (1986). Hanai, a Poem for Queen Liliuokalani. Honolulu: Topgallant Publishing Company. ISBN 978-0-914916-74-1. OCLC 14903156.
- Holt, John Dominis. History of the Protestant Mission in Hawaii: 1830–1835. OCLC 46632597.
- Holt, John Dominis (1971). Kaulana Na Pua—Famous Are the Flowers: Queen Liliuokalani and the Throne of Hawaii. Honolulu: Topgallant Publishing Company. ISBN 978-0-914916-01-7. OCLC 4527828.
- Holt, Frances MacKinnon Damon; Holt, John Dominis (1973). Moanalua: Statement on the Historical Significance of Moanalua. Honolulu: Moanalua Gardens Foundation. OCLC 663213152.
- Holt, John Dominis (1974). Monarchy in Hawaii. Honolulu: Hogarth Press. OCLC 2405531.
- Holt, John Dominis (1979). Moʻolelo ʻo Holt. Honolulu: Kamehameha Schools/Bernice P. Bishop Estate. OCLC 8775981.
- Holt, John Dominis (1964). On Being Hawaiian (1st ed.). Honolulu: Honolulu Star-Bulletin. OCLC 222391884.
- Holt, John Dominis (1974). On Being Hawaiian (2nd ed.). Honolulu: Topgallant Publishing Company. ISBN 978-0-914916-23-9. OCLC 1231853.
- Missing third edition
- Holt, John Dominis (1995). On Being Hawaiian (4th ed.). Honolulu: Kū Paʻa. ISBN 978-0-914916-23-9. OCLC 680564031.
- Holt, John Dominis (1977). Princess of the Night Rides and Other Tales. Honolulu: Topgallant Publishing Company. ISBN 978-0-914916-22-2. OCLC 2345624.
- Holt, John Dominis (1993). Recollections: Memoirs of John Dominis Holt, 1919–1935. Honolulu: Kū Paʻa. ISBN 9780681027831. OCLC 30886291.
- Holt, John Dominis (1988). Robert William Holt: Founder of the Holt Family in Hawaii. Honolulu: Topgallant Publishing Company. OCLC 19664741.
- Holt, John Dominis. The Royal Children of the Tabu Chiefess Keopuolani and the Great Kamehameha I. Honolulu. OCLC 851897816.
- Holt, John Dominis (1965). Today Ees Sad-dy Night and Other Stories. Honolulu: Star-Bulletin Print. Co. OCLC 16340589.
- Holt, John Dominis (1976). Waimea Summer: a Novel. Honolulu: Topgallant Publishing Company. ISBN 978-0-914916-12-3. OCLC 3187684.

== Bibliography ==
- Casey, Alexander. "Surrounded by Spirits: Hauntings of Identity in Waimea Summer by John Dominis Holt." Dzieciństwo. Literatura i Kultura 2, no. 1 (2020): 78–91.
- Dye, Bob, ed. (1998). Hawaiʻi Chronicles Two. Honolulu: University of Hawaii Press. ISBN 978-0-8248-1984-2. OCLC 249244077.
- Hershinow, Sheldon (Summer 1980). "John Dominis Holt: Hawaiian-American Traditionalist". MELUS. 7 (2). Oxford: Oxford University Press: 61–72. doi:10.2307/467085. JSTOR 467085.
- Holt, John Dominis; Sinesky, Alice (1987). "John Dominis Holt". Watumull Foundation Oral History Project. 16. Honolulu. hdl:10524/48676. OCLC 663425247.
- Ledward, Brandon C. (2007). "On Being Hawaiian Enough: Contesting American Racialization with Native Hybridity" (PDF). Hūlili: Multidisciplinary Research on Hawaiian Well-Being. 4 (1). Honolulu: Kamehameha Schools: 107–143. OCLC 906020258.
- Lee, Candace W. (July 2004). "A Biography of John Dominis Holt". A Catalog of the Johanna Drew Cluney Collection. Honolulu: Kamehameha Schools Archives: viii–ix. OCLC 56685712.
- Nelson, Emmanuel S. (2015). Ethnic American Literature: An Encyclopedia for Students: An Encyclopedia for Students. Santa Barbara: ABC-CLIO. ISBN 978-1-61069-881-8. OCLC 902958180.
- Najita, Susan Y. (2006). Decolonizing Cultures in the Pacific: Reading History and Trauma in Contemporary Fiction. New York: Routledge. ISBN 978-1-134-21171-5. OCLC 77210286.
- Smith, Keri E. Iyall (2007). The State and Indigenous Movements. New York: Routledge. ISBN 978-1-135-86179-7. OCLC 70107033.
- Taylor, Clarice B. (1954). Holt, Lisa Ululani (ed.). The Fabulous Holt. Honolulu: Honolulu Star-Bulletin. Archived from the original on December 8, 2016.
