= 1892 legislative session of the Hawaiian Kingdom =

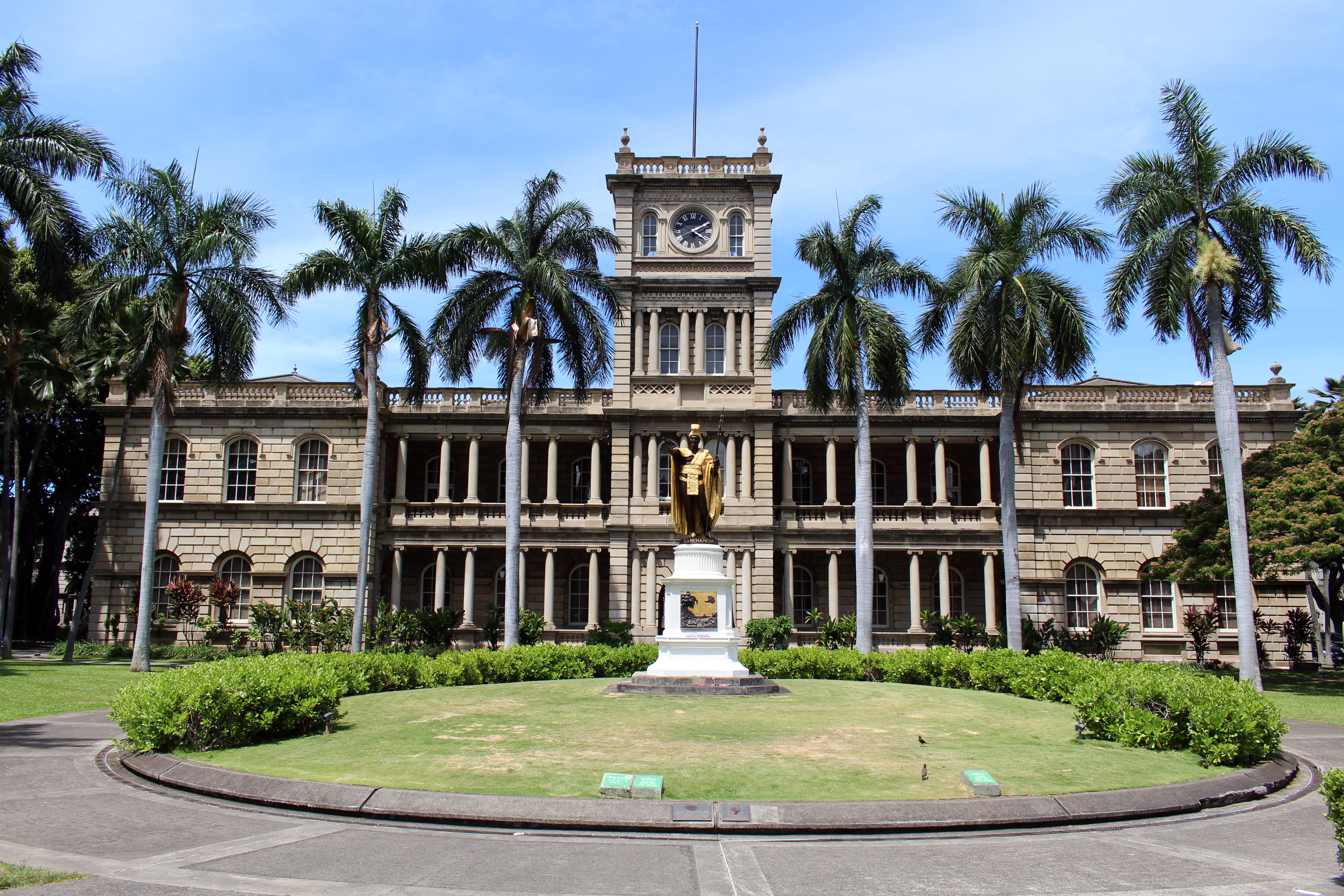
The Legislative Assembly of 1892 met at the seat of government at Aliʻiōlani Hale (pictured) which was situated across the street from ʻIolani Palace

The 1892 session of the Legislature of the Hawaiian Kingdom, also known as the Longest Legislature, was a period from May 28, 1892, to January 14, 1893, in which the legislative assembly of the Hawaiian Kingdom met for its traditional bi-annual session. This unicameral body was composed of the upper House of Nobles and the lower House of Representatives. This would be the first session during the reign of Queen Liliʻuokalani and the last meeting of the legislative assembly during the Hawaiian monarchy. Three days after the prorogation of the assembly, many of the political tension developed during the legislative debates and the queen's attempt to promulgate a new constitution while her legislators were not in session led to the overthrow of the Hawaiian Kingdom on January 17, 1893.

Members of this legislative session included citizens and subjects of the kingdom of either full or mixed Native Hawaiian, Euro-American and Asian descent, who were divided across different party lines. They included the insurgents who would play an eventual role in the deposition of the queen, and also the political resistance leaders who would lead the opposition to the overthrow and attempts to annex the Hawaiian Islands to the United States.

== Background ==
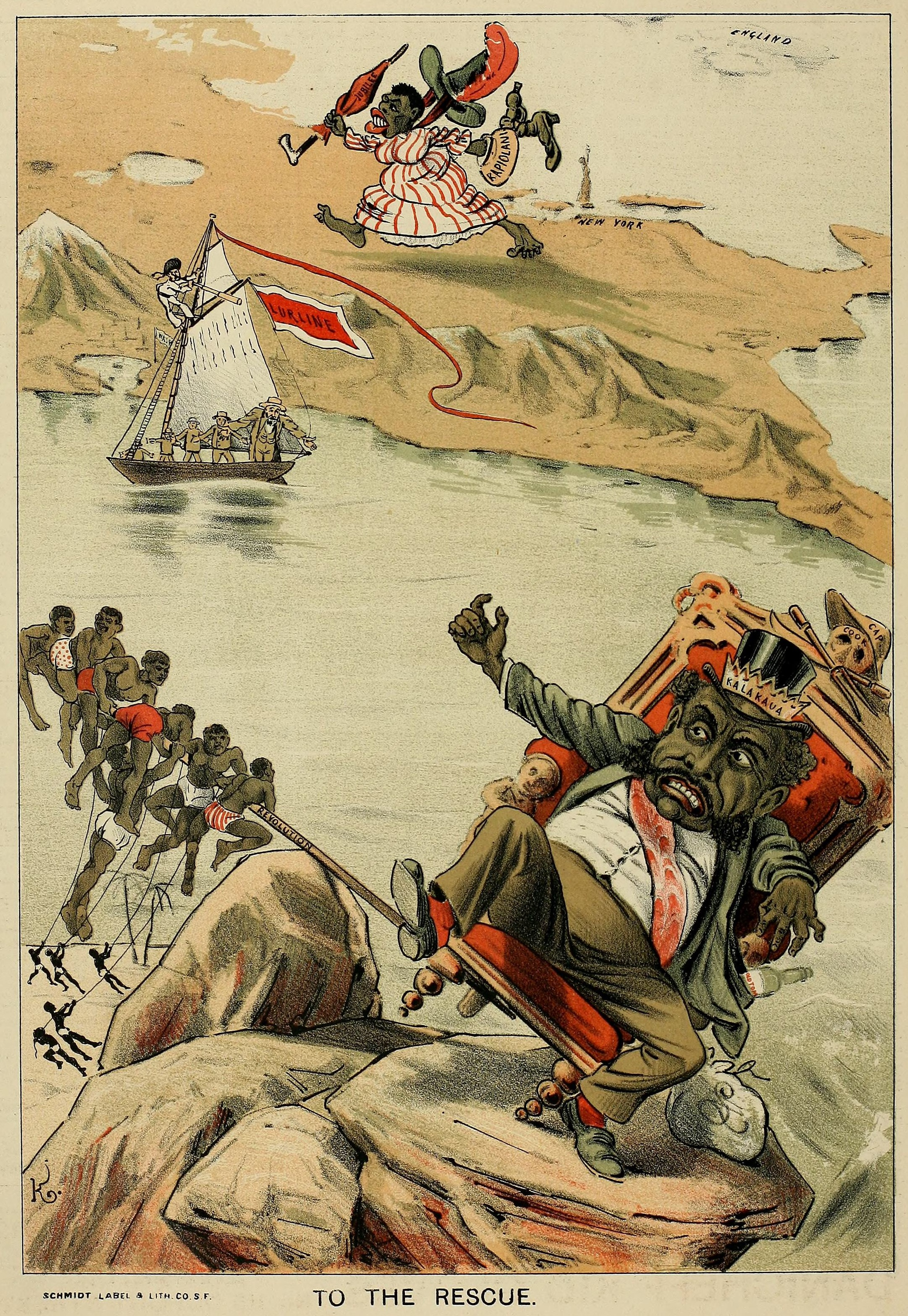
Political cartoon depicting the coup d'état which resulted in the signing of the Bayonet Constitution, 1887

In 1887, King Kalākaua was forced to sign the Bayonet Constitution under duress by the Hawaiian League, a group of foreign businessman and Hawaiian subjects of American missionary descent including Lorrin A. Thurston. This constitution limited the absolute power of the monarch and strengthened the power of the executive cabinet. It also raised property requirements for suffrage, disenfranchised many poor Native Hawaiians and naturalized Asian citizens, and gave the vote to unnaturalized foreign residents of European or American descent. It also changed membership in the House of Nobles, the upper house of the legislature, from life appointments by the king to elected offices for the first time. A new cabinet headed by Thurston was imposed on the king and the king's previous administration headed by Walter Murray Gibson was ousted.

The instigators of this coup d'état formed the Reform Party, drawing its memberships from Hawaiian conservatives and citizens of foreign descent, and won the majority of the seats in the legislature in the election of 1887, which was mandated by the new constitution. In the election of 1890, the Hui Kālaiʻāina (Hawaiian Political Association) and the Mechanics' and Workingmen's Political Protective Union joined together to form the National Reform Party in opposition to the Reform Party in this session. The Reform Party lost their majority control in the legislature and the Thurston cabinet was removed by a legislative vote of want of confidence.

Following the prorogation of the legislature of 1890, King Kalakaua died while in San Francisco and was succeeded by his sister Queen Liliʻuokalani on January 29, 1891.

== Election of 1892 ==
The general election of 1892 proved the most contentious. The four major parties were the Reform, National Reform, National Liberal, and the Native Sons of Hawaii which ran the same candidates as the National Reformers. The National Reform Party became the administration or governmental party and gained the personal support of the new queen. They joined with the Reformers and Native Sons in opposing the more radical elements of the National Liberal. The National Liberal Party, which became the party of the opposition, advocated for increased Native Hawaiian participation in the government and a constitutional convention to draft a new constitution to replace the unpopular Bayonet Constitution. However, the Liberals soon became divided between radicals and more conciliatory groups. Joseph Nāwahī and William Pūnohu White became the leaders of the factions of the Liberals loyal to the queen against the more radical members led by John E. Bush and Robert William Wilcox, who were advocating for drastic changes such as increased power for the people and a republican form of government.

The election resulted in a divided legislature, although the conservatives painted it as a victory for their coalition. It was hard to tell where the exact loyalty of many of the elected nobles and representatives lay because of internal disagreement. According to historian Ralph S. Kuykendall, "the party composition of the 1892 legislature (the forty-eight elected members) appeared to be: Reform Party, twenty-three; Liberal Party, thirteen; National Reform Party, nine; Independent, three".

== Legislative session ==
From May 28, 1892, to January 14, 1893, the legislature of the Kingdom convened for an unprecedented 171 days, which later historians such as Albertine Loomis and Helena G. Allen dubbed the "Longest Legislature". This would be the first session during the reign of Queen Liliʻuokalani and the last meeting of the legislative assembly during the Hawaiian monarchy.

At the opening of the legislature, forty-eight elected politicians, consisting of twenty-four nobles (including thirteen holdovers continued their terms from the 1890 legislature) and twenty-four representatives from the four main Hawaiian Islands met at the legislative halls of Aliʻiōlani Hale in Honolulu. The legislature met as a unicameral body composed of the upper House of Nobles and the lower House of Representatives with Noble John Smith Walker presiding as President of the Legislative Assembly and Noble John Kauhane as Vice-President. The body included politicians of Native Hawaiian descent, Euro-American descent, mixed Hawaiian and Euro-American descent, and even three members of Chinese-Hawaiian descent. The appointed cabinet ministers also had the right to participate as ex-officio members of the legislature with the right to vote on all matters except on votes for their removal. In the course of the session, five members would resign and three new members chosen in special elections to replace with two of the five members reclaiming their vacated seats.

This session was dominated by political infighting within and between and the different parties. Debates heard on the floor of the houses concerned the popular demand for a new constitution, the passage of a lottery bill and an opium licensing bill, aimed at alleviating the economic crisis caused by the McKinley Tariff. By the end of the session, the queen had also signed into law the lottery bill and opium licensing bill, which were extremely controversial in the foreign community and especially with the leaders of the Reform Party.

Petitions asking for a new constitution were submitted by seven legislators: Noble David William Pua and Representatives Joseph Nāwahī, William Pūnohu White, Jose Kekahuna Iosepa, Anakalea Kauhi, T. S. Nahinu, Luther W. P. Kanealii and George Panila Kamauoha. Attempts were made to call a constitutional convention to draft a new constitution in both the 1890 session and the 1892 session. Both National Liberals and National Reformers campaigned on the promise of a new constitution, however many National Reformers supported a middle path and advocated for changes via amendments. The conservative Reformers would not tolerate any changes to the existing constitution. There was also disagreement on the legality of how to execute the change. No clear comparable precedents existed, since previous constitutions had been promulgated by the sovereign.

The main issue of contention between the new monarch and the legislators was the retention of her cabinet ministers; political division prevented Liliʻuokalani from appointing a balanced council. The 1887 constitution retained the monarch's right to appoint her own cabinet minister but gave the legislature the power to vote for the dismissal of her cabinet. Seven resolutions of want of confidence were introduced during this session, and four of her self-appointed cabinets (the Widemann, Macfarlane, Cornwell, and Wilcox cabinets) were ousted by votes of the legislature. During this session, Nāwahī also proposed a bill to the legislature to amend the constitution to give women the right to vote. The bill failed to pass. Had it been made into law, Hawaii would have preceded New Zealand as the first nation to allow women to vote.

On January 13, 1893, after the legislature dismissed the Wilcox cabinet (which had political sympathies to the Reform Party), Liliʻuokalani appointed the new Parker cabinet, which had ties to the National Reform Party and consisted of Samuel Parker, as minister of foreign affairs; John F. Colburn, as minister of the interior; William H. Cornwell, as minister of finance; and Arthur P. Peterson, as attorney general.

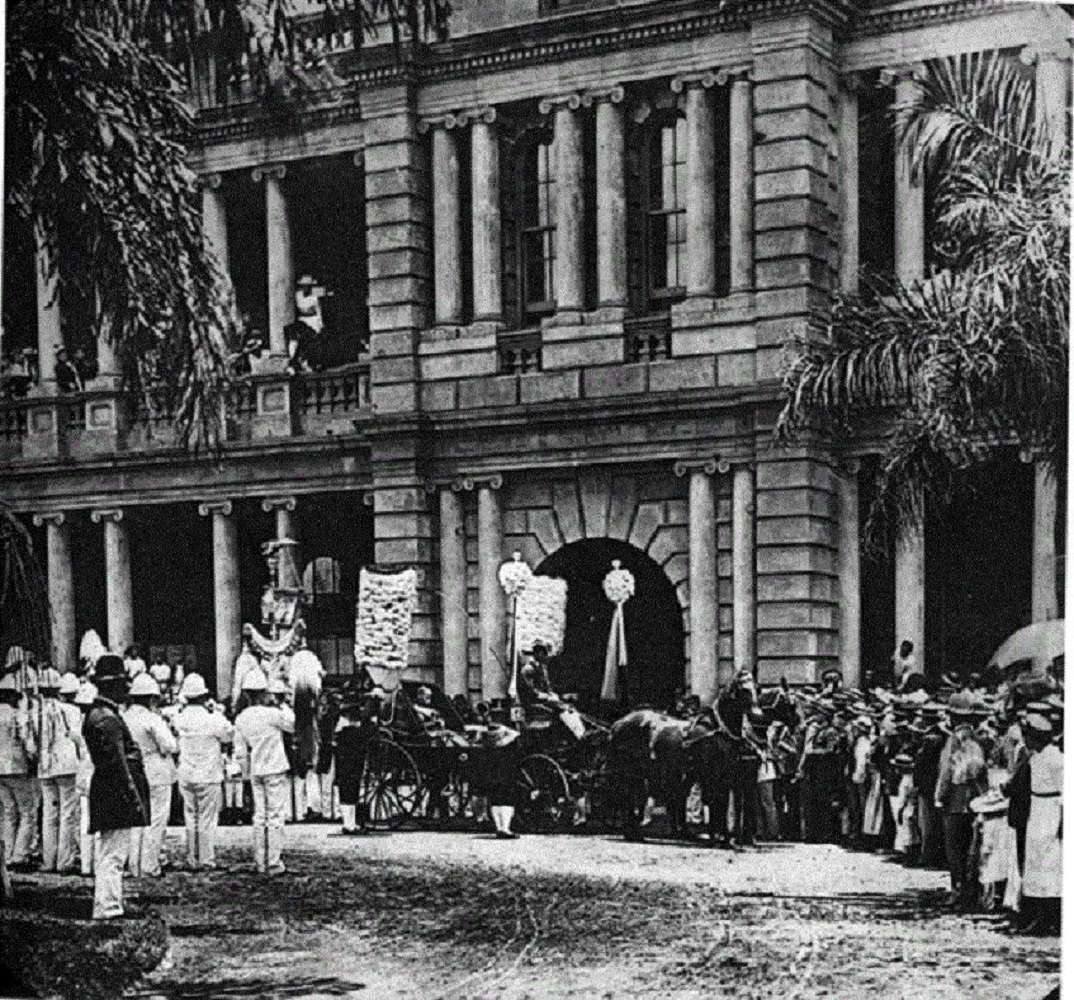
Queen Liliʻuokalani leaving Aliiolani Hale following the prorogation ceremony, 1893

The legislative assembly was prorogued January 14, at a noon ceremony officiated by the queen at Aliʻiōlani Hale, which was situated across the street from ʻIolani Palace.

== Aftermath ==
Following the prorogation of the legislative session, Liliʻuokalani attempted to promulgate a new constitution while the legislature was not in session. In reaction to the legislative stand still on the constitution convention bill, the queen met in secret with the two leaders of the Liberal Party: Representatives Nāwahī and White and Samuel Nowlein, the captain of her Royal Guards, to draft a new constitution.

In the afternoon of January 14, she met with her cabinet ministers while members of Hui Kālaiʻāina and a delegation of native legislators marched to ʻIolani Palace with a sealed package containing the constitution for her to promulgate. According to historian William DeWitt Alexander, this was pre-planned by the queen. However, she discovered the ministers were either opposed to or reluctant to sign the new constitution and the queen had to postpone her plans and dismiss the delegations of political leaders and the assembled crowds from the palace. She later wrote, "I told them I would not have taken such a step if they had not encouraged me. They had led me out to the edge of a precipice, and now were leaving me to take the step alone."

The political fallout of the queen's actions led to citywide political rallies and meetings in Honolulu. Anti-monarchists, annexationists, and leading Reformist politicians, including legislators Lorrin A. Thurston, William Owen Smith, and William Chauncey Wilder, formed the Committee of Safety in protest of the "revolutionary" action of the queen and conspired to depose her. In response, royalists and loyalists formed the Committee of Law and Order and met at the palace square on January 16. White, Nāwahī, Bush, Wilcox, and Antone Rosa and other pro-monarchist leaders gave speeches in support for the queen and the government. These actions and the radicalized political climate eventually led to the overthrow of the monarchy, on January 17, 1893, by the Committee of Safety, with the covert support of United States Minister John L. Stevens and the landing of American forces from the USS Boston. After a brief transition under the Provisional Government, the oligarchical Republic of Hawaii was established on July 4, 1894, with Sanford B. Dole as president. During this period, the de facto government was composed largely of residents of American and European ancestry, although a few Native Hawaiians from the 1892 legislature: John Ena, John Kauhane, and Jose Kekahuna Iosepa signed the constitutional convention for the Republic while Kauhane and George Panila Kamauoha would serve multiple terms in the legislature of the Republic.

Many of the former legislators of the 1892 session, including Robert William Wilcox and Joseph Nāwahī, would lead the opposition to the overthrow and resistance to annexation of the Hawaiian Islands to the United States. In 1893, Nawahi and many former 1892 legislators founded the Hui Aloha ʻĀina (Hawaiian Patriotic League), a patriotic group founded to protest annexation, while Wilcox led an unsuccessful counter-revolution in 1895 to restore the monarchy.

== Members of the Legislative Assembly ==
=== House of Nobles ===
The makeup of the House of Nobles according to The Pacific Commercial Advertiser Hawaiian National Liberal Party: 2 seats National Reform Party (Hawaii): 10 seats Reform Party (Hawaii): 14 seats N/A: 1 seat

This incomplete breakdown of party allegiance are based on The Pacific Commercial Advertiser, a contemporary newspaper, reporting at the beginning of the legislative session and the report of Noble Edward C. MacFarlane in the Blount Report.

| Name | District | Party at election | Party (Blount Report) | Notes | Sources |
|---|---|---|---|---|---|
| Robert Renton Hind | Hawaii | Reform | Independent | | |
| John Meirs Horner | Hawaii | Reform | Reform | | |
| John Green Hoapili | Hawaii | National Liberal | National Reform | | |
| John Kauhane | Hawaii | Reform | Reform | Served as Vice-President of the Legislative Assembly | |
| Joseph Marsden | Hawaii | Reform | Reform | | |
| Alexander Young | Hawaii | Reform | Reform | | |
| James Anderson | Maui, Molokai, Lanai | Reform | Reform | | |
| Henry Perrine Baldwin | Maui, Molokai, Lanai | Reform | Reform | | |
| William H. Cornwell | Maui, Molokai, Lanai | Reform | National Reform | Resigned on November 1 and appointed Minister of Finance. Re-elected on December 5. | |
| William Yates Horner | Maui, Molokai, Lanai | Reform | Reform | | |
| Lorrin A. Thurston | Maui, Molokai, Lanai | Reform | Reform | | |
| Russell D. Walbridge | Maui, Molokai, Lanai | Reform | Reform | | |
| Charles Otto Berger | Oahu | National Reform | National Reform | | |
| John Adams Cummins | Oahu | National Reform | National Reform | | |
| John Ena | Oahu | National Reform | National Reform | | |
| Charles Louis Kāmohoaliʻi Hopkins | Oahu | National Reform | N/A | Served from October 7 after the resignation of Macfarlane | |
| Edward C. Macfarlane | Oahu | National Reform | National Reform | Resigned on September 12 and appointed Minister of Finance | |
| C. B. Maile | Oahu | National Reform | N/A | Served from October 7 after the resignation of Neumann. | |
| Paul Neumann | Oahu | National Reform | National Reform | Resigned on August 29 and appointed Attorney General | |
| Arthur P. Peterson | Oahu | National Reform | National Reform | | |
| David William Pua | Oahu | National Liberal | National Reform | | |
| John Smith Walker | Oahu | National Reform | National Reform | Served as President of the Legislative Assembly | |
| John Norman Spencer Williams | Oahu | National Reform | National Reform | | |
| August Dreier | Kauai and Niihau | Reform | Independent | | |
| Paul P. Kanoa | Kauai and Niihau | Reform | Reform | | |
| Alexander M. McBryde | Kauai and Niihau | N/A | N/A | Served from December 19 when he replaced Wilcox after he was appointed Minister of the Interior | |
| George Norton Wilcox | Kauai and Niihau | Reform | Reform | Resigned on November 18 and appointed Minister of the Interior | |

=== House of Representatives ===
The makeup of the House of Representatives according to The Pacific Commercial Advertiser Hawaiian National Liberal Party: 13 seats Reform Party (Hawaii): 8 seats Independent: 3 seats

| Name | District | Islands | Party at election | Party (Blount Report) | Notes | Sources |
|---|---|---|---|---|---|---|
| Albert Horner, Jr. | North Hilo | Hawaii | Reform | Reform | | |
| George Panila Kamauoha | Kohala | Hawaii | National Liberal | National Liberal | | |
| John N. Kapahu | Kau | Hawaii | National Liberal | N/A | | |
| John K. Kaunamano | Hamakua | Hawaii | Independent | National Reform | | |
| K. M. Koahou | Central Hilo | Hawaii | National Liberal | National Liberal | | |
| Joseph Nāwahī | South Hilo | Hawaii | National Liberal | National Liberal | Resigned on November 1 and appointed Minister of Finance. Re-elected on December 24. | |
| James H. Waipuilani | Kona | Hawaii | Reform | National Reform | | |
| William Edmonds | South Wailuku | Maui, Molokai, Lanai | Reform | N/A | | |
| Jose Kekahuna Iosepa | Hana | Maui, Molokai, Lanai | Reform | Reform | | |
| John Kaluna | Makawao | Maui, Molokai, Lanai | Reform | Reform | | |
| Luther W. P. Kanealii | North Wailuku | Maui, Molokai, Lanai | National Liberal | National Liberal | | |
| T. S. Nahinu (Note: Sometime given as G. S. Nahinu.) | Molokai | Maui, Molokai, Lanai | Independent | National Liberal | | |
| William Pūnohu White | Lahaina | Maui, Molokai, Lanai | National Liberal | National Liberal | | |
| Samuel K. Aki | Ward 4, Honolulu | Oahu | National Liberal | National Liberal | | |
| Clarence W. Ashford | Ward 3, Honolulu | Oahu | National Liberal | National Liberal | | |
| John W. Bipikane | Ward 2, Honolulu | Oahu | National Liberal | National Liberal | | |
| John E. Bush | Ward 6, Koolau | Oahu | National Liberal | National Liberal | | |
| Anakalea Kauhi | Ward 8, Ewa | Oahu | Independent | Independent | | |
| Samuel K. Pua | Ward 5, Honolulu | Oahu | National Liberal | National Liberal | | |
| Robert William Wilcox | Ward 7, Waialua | Oahu | National Liberal | National Liberal | | |
| William Chauncey Wilder | Ward 1, Honolulu | Oahu | Reform | Reform | | |
| Joseph Apukai Akina | Waimea | Kauai and Niihau | National Liberal | National Liberal | | |
| William Owen Smith | Lihue | Kauai and Niihau | Reform | Reform | | |
| Albert Spencer Wilcox | Hanalei | Kauai and Niihau | Reform | Reform | | |

=== Cabinet ministers ===
According to Article 42 of the 1887 Constitution, "The Cabinet holds seats ex officio, in the Legislature, with the right to vote, except on a question of want of confidence in them." Each cabinet were named after the leading cabinet ministers.

| Name | Position | Assumed office | Left office | Party | Notes | Sources |
|---|---|---|---|---|---|---|
The Widemann Cabinet
| William Austin Whiting | Attorney General | February 25, 1891 | July 27, 1892 | National Reform | | |
| Charles Nichols Spencer | Minister of the Interior | February 25, 1891 | September 12, 1892 | National Reform | | |
| Hermann A. Widemann | Minister of Finance | February 25, 1891; January 28, 1892 | March 10, 1891; September 12, 1892 | National Reform | Resigned in 1891 and reappointed in 1892 | |
| John Mott-Smith | Minister of Finance | July 28, 1891 | October 17, 1891 | Reform | | |
| Samuel Parker | Minister of Foreign Affairs | February 25, 1891 | September 12, 1892 | National Reform | First term, Parker also served as acting Minister of Finance between March 10, 1891 and July 28, 1891 after Widemann's resignation and between October 17, 1891 and January 28, 1892 after Mott-Smith's resignation | |
The Macfarlane Cabinet
| Paul Neumann | Attorney General | September 12, 1892 | November 1, 1892 | National Reform | Former member of the House of Nobles | |
| Charles T. Gulick | Minister of the Interior | September 12, 1892 | November 1, 1892 | National Reform | First term | |
| Edward C. Macfarlane | Minister of Finance | September 12, 1892 | November 1, 1892 | National Reform | Former member of the House of Nobles | |
| Samuel Parker | Minister of Foreign Affairs | September 12, 1892 | November 1, 1892 | National Reform | Second term | |
The Cornwell Cabinet
| Charles F. Creighton | Attorney General | November 1, 1892 | November 1, 1892 | N/A | | |
| Charles T. Gulick | Minister of the Interior | November 1, 1892 | November 1, 1892 | National Reform | Second term | |
| William H. Cornwell | Minister of Finance | November 1, 1892 | November 1, 1892 | National Reform | First term. Former member of the House of Nobles. | |
| Joseph Nāwahī | Minister of Foreign Affairs | November 1, 1892 | November 1, 1892 | National Liberal | Former member of the House of Representatives. | |
The Wilcox Cabinet
| Cecil Brown | Attorney General | November 8, 1892 | January 12, 1893 | Reform | | |
| George Norton Wilcox | Minister of the Interior | November 8, 1892 | January 12, 1893 | Reform | | |
| Peter Cushman Jones | Minister of Finance | November 8, 1892 | January 12, 1893 | Reform | | |
| Mark Prever Robinson | Minister of Foreign Affairs | November 8, 1892 | January 12, 1893 | Reform | | |
The Parker Cabinet
| Arthur P. Peterson | Attorney General | January 12, 1893 | January 17, 1893 | National Reform | | |
| John F. Colburn | Minister of the Interior | January 12, 1893 | January 17, 1893 | National Reform | | |
| William H. Cornwell | Minister of Finance | January 12, 1893 | January 17, 1893 | National Reform | Second term. Former member of the House of Nobles. | |
| Samuel Parker | Minister of Foreign Affairs | January 12, 1893 | January 17, 1893 | National Reform | Third term | |

== Bibliography ==
- Alexander, William DeWitt (1896). History of Later Years of the Hawaiian Monarchy and the Revolution of 1893. Honolulu: Hawaiian Gazette Company. OCLC 11843616.
- Allen, Helena G. (1982). The Betrayal of Liliuokalani: Last Queen of Hawaii, 1838–1917. Glendale, CA: A. H. Clark Company. ISBN 978-0-87062-144-4. OCLC 9576325.
- Blount, James Henderson (1895). The Executive Documents of the House of Representatives for the Third Session of the Fifty-Third Congress, 1893–'94 in Thirty-Five Volumes. Washington, DC: U.S. Government Printing Office. OCLC 191710879.
- Hawaii (1918). Lydecker, Robert Colfax (ed.). Roster Legislatures of Hawaii, 1841–1918. Honolulu: Hawaiian Gazette Company. OCLC 60737418.
- Kuykendall, Ralph Simpson (1967). The Hawaiian Kingdom 1874–1893, The Kalakaua Dynasty. Vol. 3. Honolulu: University of Hawaii Press. ISBN 978-0-87022-433-1. OCLC 500374815.
- Liliuokalani (1898). Hawaii's Story by Hawaii's Queen, Liliuokalani. Boston: Lee and Shepard. ISBN 978-0-548-22265-2. OCLC 2387226.
- Loomis, Albertine (1963). "The Longest Legislature" (PDF). Seventy-First Annual Report of the Hawaiian Historical Society for the Year 1962. 71. Honolulu: Hawaiian Historical Society: 7–27. hdl:10524/35.
- Moblo, Pennie (1998). "Institutionalising the Leper: Partisan Politics and the Evolution of Stigma in Post-Monarchy Hawaiʻi". The Journal of the Polynesian Society. 107 (3). Wellington: The Polynesian Society: 229–262. OCLC 6015242891. Archived from the original on February 13, 2018.
- Osorio, Jon Kamakawiwoʻole (2002). Dismembering Lāhui: A History of the Hawaiian Nation to 1887. Honolulu: University of Hawaii Press. ISBN 0-8248-2549-7. OCLC 48579247.
- Silva, Noenoe K. (2004). Aloha Betrayed: Native Hawaiian Resistance to American Colonialism. Durham: Duke University Press. ISBN 0-8223-8622-4. OCLC 191222123.
- Twigg-Smith, Thurston (1998). Hawaiian Sovereignty: Do the Facts Matter?. Honolulu: Goodale Publishing. ISBN 978-0-9662945-0-7. OCLC 39090004.
- Van Dyke, Jon M. (2007). Who Owns the Crown Lands of Hawai'i?. University of Hawaii Press. ISBN 978-0-8248-3211-7. OCLC 257449971.
