= Clarence W. Macfarlane =

Hawaiian businessman and yachtsman

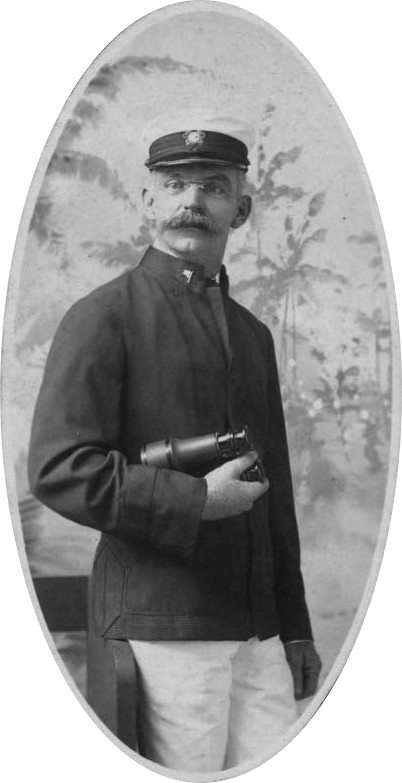
Clarence W. Macfarlane, photograph by James J. Williams

Commodore Clarence William Macfarlane (March 8, 1858 – September 15, 1947), was a businessman and yachtsman of Hawaii. He founded the Transpacific Yacht Race (Transpac) in 1906 by sailing from San Pedro/Los Angeles, California to Honolulu, Hawaii.

== Life ==
Born on March 8, 1858, in Honolulu, Hawaii, his parents were Richard (or Henry) Macfarlane (died 1860) and Eliza Macfarlane (1828–1904). His father was Scottish, of the Highland Clan MacFarlane, while his mother was of English descent. His parents married in Auckland and were early settlers of Hawaii arriving to the islands in 1846 via New Zealand. The youngest of six siblings, his brothers were: Henry R. Macfarlane, George W. Macfarlane, who served as Chamberlain of King Kalākaua, Edward C. Macfarlane, who served on as Queen Liliuokalani's cabinet minister, Frederick W. Macfarlane and sister, Helen Blanche Macfarlane who married William H. Cornwell, also a cabinet minister during the monarchy. All were born in the island with the exception of Henry who was born at sea.

During the overthrow of the Hawaiian monarchy, Macfarlane and his brothers were supporters of Queen Liliuokalani. He later became a member of the Democratic Party of Hawaii after the islands became a part of the United States.

Macfarlane engaged in business in Hawaii. He worked for the sugar plantation industry in the islands and worked in the Waikapu Sugar Company, on the island of Maui, owned by his brother George and his brother-in-law William H. Cornwell. He organized the Oceanic Gas & Electric Company and introduced the first acetylene gas plant in Hawaii. He later went into a myriad of business including liquor, exporting and importing, and hotel management with his brother George. He managed the Seaside Hotel in Waikiki.

Besides his work in business, Macfarlane became a sailing enthusiast. In Spring 1906 he sailed his 48-foot schooner, the La Paloma. from Honolulu to San Francisco in 28 days where he expected to join other San Francisco sailors in a race back to Honolulu. However, upon arriving in San Francisco on April 19, 1906, he was shocked to discover the devastating effects 1906 San Francisco earthquake that occurred the day before. He then sailed south to Los Angeles and enlisted sailors in Los Angeles Yacht Club to join him in the first transpacific (Transpac) LA-Honolulu race that started on June 11, 1906. This transpacific (Transpac) race is still held every two years from Point Fermin off San Pedro, Los Angeles and ending off of Diamond Head in Honolulu, covering a distance of 2,223 nautical miles. It also claimed he was the first Caucasian to master the traditional Hawaiian sports of surfing and sailing the outrigger canoe. He was later admitted to the Hawaii Sports Hall of Fame for his pioneering contribution to yacht racing.

He died on September 15, 1947, and was buried in the Macfarlane family plot in Oahu Cemetery.
