= Edward C. Macfarlane =

American politician (1848–1902)

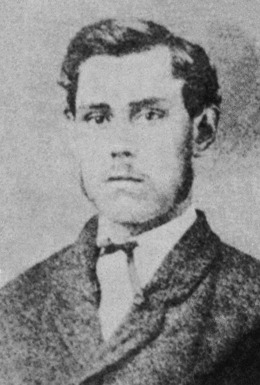

Kingdom of Hawaii Minister of Finance
- In office September 12, 1892 – November 1, 1892
- Monarch: Liliuokalani
- Preceded by: Hermann A. Widemann
- Succeeded by: William H. Cornwell

Personal details
- Born: October 8, 1848 Honolulu, Oahu, Kingdom of Hawaii
- Died: February 16, 1902 (aged 53) Chicago, Illinois
- Resting place: Oahu Cemetery
- Occupation: Politician, businessman

Edward Creamor Macfarlane (October 8, 1848 – February 16, 1902), also known as Ned Macfarlane, was a politician of the Kingdom of Hawaii. He served as Minister of Finance during the reign of Queen Liliuokalani, and was one of her trusted political advisors during the Overthrow of the Kingdom of Hawaii.

== Early life ==
He was born on October 8, 1848, in Hawaii. His parents were Richard (or Henry) Macfarlane (died 1860) and Eliza Macfarlane (1828–1904). His father was Scottish, of the Highland Clan MacFarlane, while his mother was of English descent from Devonshire. His parents married in Auckland and were early settlers of Hawaii arriving to the islands in 1846 via New Zealand. His brothers were: Henry R. Macfarlane, George W. Macfarlane, who served on as Chamberlain of King Kalākaua, Frederick W. Macfarlane and Clarence W. Macfarlane. A younger sister Helen Blanche Macfarlane married William H. Cornwell. All were born in the island with the exception of Henry who was born at sea.

He moved to California and worked for The Wasp, a San Francisco magazine, owned by Frank J. Ballinger, for a time before returning to Hawaii.

== Political career ==
In the legislative election of 1890, Macfarlane ran and was elected to the House of Nobles, the upper house of the Legislature of the Kingdom of Hawaii, for a four-year term. He sat in the legislative assembly of 1890 during the reign of King Kalākaua and during the 1892–93 session under his successor Queen Liliʻuokalani. He was a member of the Hawaiian National Reform Party in the 1890 session and remain so in the following session.

From May 28, 1892, to January 14, 1893, the legislature of the Kingdom convened for an unprecedented 171 days, which later historian Albertine Loomis dubbed the "Longest Legislature". This session was characterized by a divided legislature with no party holding control. On September 12, 1892, Macfarlane became the head of the so-called “Macfarlane Cabinet” and was appointed Minister of Finance after the previous cabinet under Hermann A. Widemann resigned. He formed his cabinet consisting of Samuel Parker, retaining him from the previous cabinet as minister of foreign affairs; Charles T. Gulick, as minister of the interior; and Paul Neumann, as attorney general. Serving a mere five weeks, he and his colleagues were voted out by the legislature on a resolution of want of confidence, on October 17. The queen asked them to retain their position until she appointed a new cabinet on November 1.

After the overthrow of the monarchy, Macfarlane accompanied Neumann and Prince David Kawānanakoa to represent the deposed queen's case to the United States government. Archibald Scott Cleghorn also paid for his travel expenses and asked him to protect the rights of his daughter Princess Kaʻiulani. Queen Liliuokalani regarded Macfarlane as a trusted advisor and confided with him during the overthrow. Writing in her 1898 memoir Hawaii's Story by Hawaii's Queen, she noted:

The Macfarlane cabinet was one of the greatest popularity amongst the Hawaiian people on account of the stand Mr. Macfarlane took in the House, and his courage in replying to the false and uncalled-for speeches of J. L. Stevens, the American Minister resident.

== Later life and death ==
After the establishment of the Territory of Hawaii, he ran as a candidate of the Democratic Party for the first Hawaii Territorial Legislature, although he was not elected. Besides politic, he also engaged in business in Hawaii. He managed E. C. Macfarlane & Company and was involved in the investment of Royal Hawaiian Hotel (not the current Waikiki hotel) with his brother George. On February 6, 1902, he married, in San Francisco, Florence Ballinger, the sister of Frank J. Ballinger, his former business partner. During their honeymoon, Macfarlane caught a cold and died of pleuropneumonia in Chicago, on February 16, 1902; contradictory reports claimed he was either 53 or 49. His remains were taken back to Honolulu for his funeral. After a Catholic ceremony, he was interred at the Macfarlane family plot in the Oahu Cemetery.

== Bibliography ==
- Blount, James Henderson (1895). The Executive Documents of the House of Representatives for the Third Session of the Fifty-Third Congress, 1893–'94 in Thirty-Five Volumes. Washington, DC: U.S. Government Printing Office. OCLC 191710879.
- Hawaii (1918). Lydecker, Robert Colfax (ed.). Roster Legislatures of Hawaii, 1841–1918. Honolulu: Hawaiian Gazette Company. OCLC 60737418.
- Kuykendall, Ralph Simpson (1967). The Hawaiian Kingdom 1874–1893, The Kalakaua Dynasty. Vol. 3. Honolulu: University of Hawaii Press. ISBN 978-0-87022-433-1. OCLC 500374815.
- Liliuokalani (1898). Hawaii's Story by Hawaii's Queen, Liliuokalani. Boston: Lee and Shepard. ISBN 978-0-548-22265-2. OCLC 2387226.
- Loomis, Albertine (1963). "The Longest Legislature" (PDF). Seventy-First Annual Report of the Hawaiian Historical Society for the Year 1962. 71. Honolulu: Hawaiian Historical Society: 7–27. hdl:10524/35.
- Twigg-Smith, Thurston (1998). Hawaiian Sovereignty: Do the Facts Matter?. Honolulu: Goodale Publishing. ISBN 978-0-9662945-0-7. OCLC 39090004.
