= George W. Macfarlane =

British businessman, courtier and politician

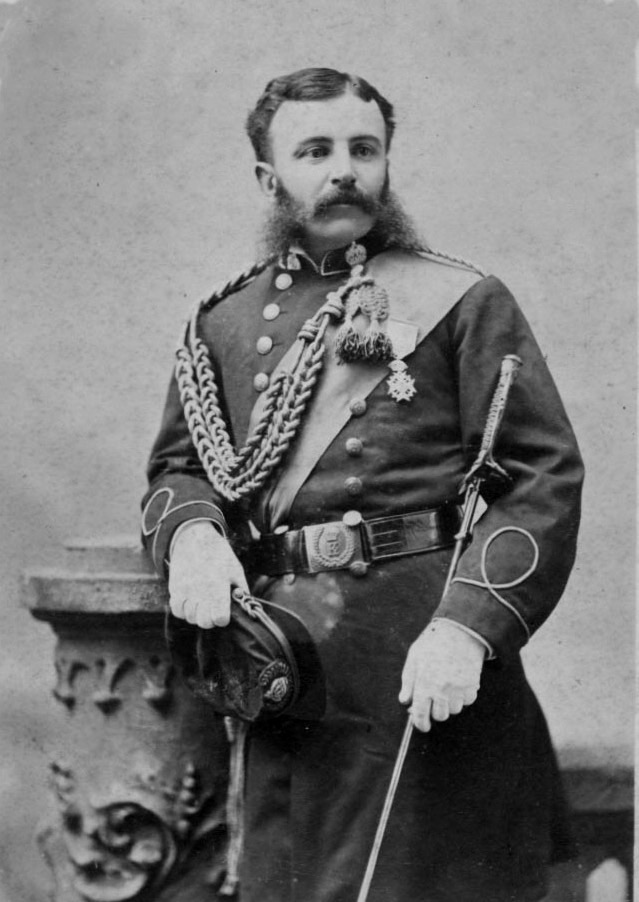

Chamberlain to the Royal Household
- In office 1888–1891
- Monarch: Kalākaua

Personal details
- Born: March 1, 1849 Honolulu, Hawaii
- Died: February 20, 1921 (aged 71) New York City
- Resting place: Oahu Cemetery
- Spouse: Florence Ballinger
- Occupation: Politician, businessman

Military service
- Allegiance: Kingdom of Hawaii
- Branch/service: Governor of Oahu's Staff; King's Staff
- Rank: Colonel; Major

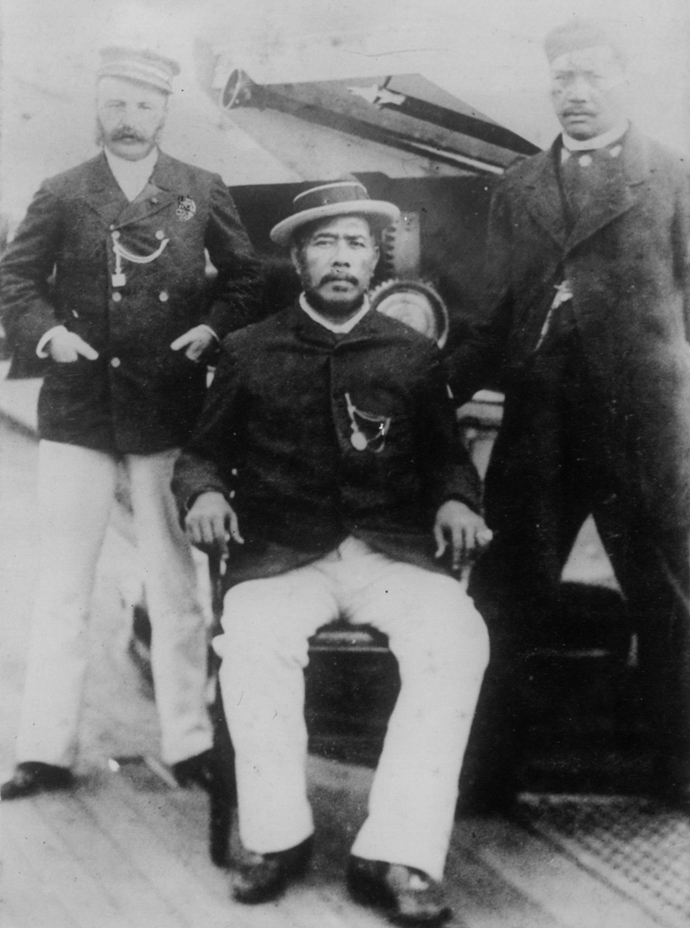
Kalākaua with Colonel Macfarlane and Colonel Robert Hoapili Baker aboard the USS Charleston en route to San Francisco, California

George Walter Hunter Macfarlane (March 1, 1849 – February 20, 1921) was a British businessman, courtier and politician of the Kingdom of Hawaii. He served Colonel of the military staff of King Kalākaua, traveling with the monarch on his 1881 world tour. He also served as his final chamberlain of king and was at his deathbed in 1891.

== Early life ==
He was born March 1, 1849, in Honolulu, Hawaii. His parents were Henry Richard Macfarlane (died 1860) and Eliza Macfarlane (1828–1904). His father was Scottish, of the Highland Clan MacFarlane, while his mother was of English descent from Devonshire. His parents married in Auckland and were early settlers of Hawaii arriving to the islands in 1846 via New Zealand. His brothers were: Henry R. Macfarlane, Edward C. Macfarlane, who served on as Queen Liliuokalani's cabinet minister, Frederick W. Macfarlane and Clarence W. Macfarlane. A younger sister Helen Blanche Macfarlane married William H. Cornwell. All were born in the island with the exception of Henry who was born at sea. He attended Punahou School.

== Political career ==
During the reign of Kalākaua, George Macfarlane was made a Major on the military staff of the Governor of Oahu, John Owen Dominis, and later was elevated to the rank of colonel on the king's military staff. He would also serve as a member of the House of Nobles in the Legislature of the Kingdom of Hawaii, participating in the session of 1886. He also served on the Privy Council of State, the advisory council of the monarch.

In 1881, he accompanied Kalākaua on his tour around the world, serving as his aide-de-camp. He didn't travel the entire trip around world, only accompanying the king and his suite, including the then-incumbent Chamberlain Charles Hastings Judd and cabinet minister William Nevins Armstrong, on the first leg of the journey from Honolulu to San Francisco and later rejoining them in Europe and the United States. In 1888, he was appointed as Chamberlain of the Royal Household. With Robert Hoapili Baker, he accompanied the king on his final visit to the United States aboard the USS Charleston, in November 1890. While visiting Southern California, the king drank excessively and fell ill in January 1891 and had to be returned to San Francisco. Hoapili and Macfarlane were at his deathbed at San Francisco's Palace Hotel; he sat at the head of the bed clasping the king's right hand. Kalākaua died on January 20, 1891 The new queen Liliuokalani removed Macfarlane as Chamberlain and appointed James William Robertson to the post.

== Later life ==
Besides politics, he was also involved in business investing in sugarcane plantation and was an owner of the Royal Hawaiian Hotel, in downtown Honolulu, Park Beach Hotel, one of the first hotel at Waikiki, and the Seaside Hotel (now the site of the current Royal Hawaiian Hotel). Macfarlane died at his home, 610 West 150th Street, in New York City, on February 20, 1921, of apoplexy, at the age of 71. He was buried at Oahu Cemetery in Honolulu.

== Bibliography ==
- Armstrong, William N. (1904). Around the World with a King. New York: F. A. Stokes Company. OCLC 489773.
- Hawaii (1918). Lydecker, Robert Colfax (ed.). Roster Legislatures of Hawaii, 1841–1918. Honolulu: Hawaiian Gazette Company. OCLC 60737418.
- Kuykendall, Ralph Simpson (1967). The Hawaiian Kingdom 1874–1893, The Kalakaua Dynasty. Vol. 3. Honolulu: University of Hawaii Press. ISBN 978-0-87022-433-1. OCLC 500374815.
- Liliuokalani (1898). Hawaii's Story by Hawaii's Queen, Liliuokalani. Boston: Lee and Shepard. ISBN 978-0-548-22265-2. OCLC 2387226.
- Tilton, Cecil G. (1927). The History of Banking in Hawaii. Honolulu: University of Hawaii. OCLC 254527501.
