= Joseph Apukai Akina =

Hawaiian politician

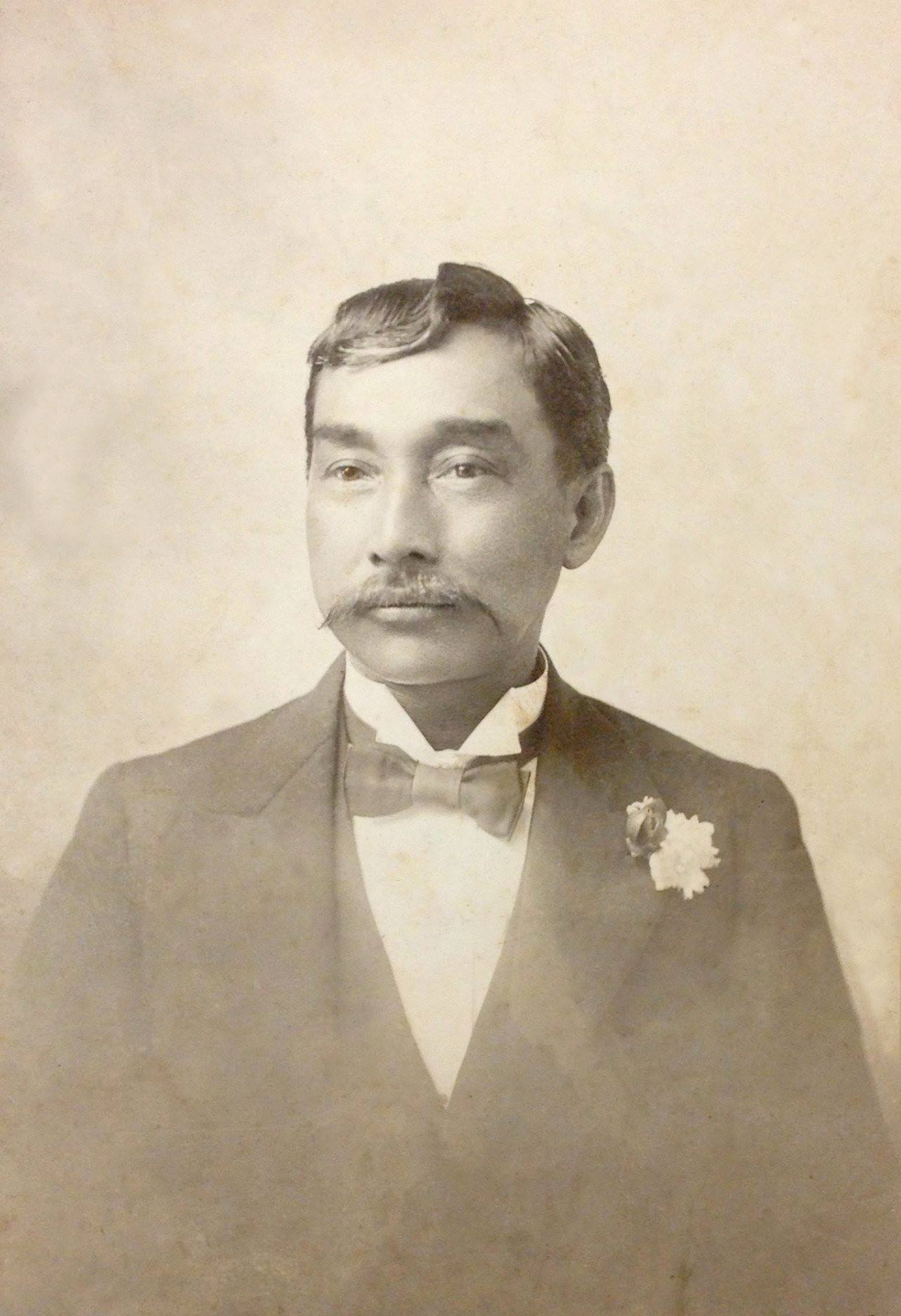

Member of the Kingdom of Hawaii House of Representatives for the district of Waimea, Kauai
- In office May 28, 1892 – January 14, 1893

Member of the Territory of Hawaii House of Representatives for the Sixth District
- In office February 20, 1901 – July 29, 1901

Speaker of the Hawaii Territory Legislative Assembly
- In office 1901–1901

Personal details
- Born: June 15, 1856 Lahaina, Maui, Kingdom of Hawaii
- Died: March 16, 1920 (aged 63) Kalihi, Honolulu, Territory of Hawaii
- Resting place: Kawaiahaʻo Church
- Party: Home Rule; National Liberal; Reform
- Children: 6
- Parent(s): Ten Sung Akina and Kaimikahu Hiku
- Occupation: Lawyer, Politician, Pastor

Joseph Apukai Akina (June 15, 1856 – March 16, 1920) was a lawyer, politician and minister of the Kingdom of Hawaii and later the Territory of Hawaii. He served as a statesman during the reign of Queen Liliʻuokalani and later became the first Speaker of the House of Representatives in the Hawaii Territorial Legislature.

== Early life and family ==
Akina was born on June 15, 1856, of Native Hawaiian and Chinese descent, was the son to Ten Sung Akina and his wife Kaimikahu Hiku. He resided on Waimea, on the island of Kauai, where he started his career as a lawyer. He was recorded as "one of the best versed Hawaiian scholars". He married twice. With his first wife, a native Hawaiian woman, he had three children including Mrs. Chris Johnson, Lillian Keaki Kawai Akina (born December 25, 1885), who married William Volney Hardy, and Edwin Hiku Akina, chief quartermaster at Camp Dewey in Brooklyn, New York. With his second wife, he had three other children.

== Political career ==
In 1901, Akina was first elected to the Territorial Hawaiian legislature, and elected the first Speaker of the House. A Russian immigrant was elected President of the Senate. The Independent Home-Rule party, with a majority of native Hawaiians, controlled both houses, which required bi-lingual translations. Some in the American press labeled Akina a "half-breed Chinese".

In the election of 1892, Akina was elected as a member of the House of Representatives, the lower house of the Hawaiian legislature, for his home district of Waimea, Kauai. He ran as candidate for the Reform Party, which was dominated by the conservatives parts of the government, and defeated National Liberal candidate E. L. Kauai and Independent candidate A. P. Kalaukoa for the seat, but the Blount Report later listed him as a member of the National Liberal party. From May 28, 1892 to January 14, 1893, the legislature of the Kingdom convened for an unprecedented 171 days, which later historian Albertine Loomis dubbed the "Longest Legislature". This session was characterized by a series of resolutions of want of confidence ousting a number of Queen Liliʻuokalani's appointed cabinet ministers and debates over the passage of the controversial lottery and opium bills. The monarchy was overthrown and the Queen deposed soon after the commencement of the 1892–93 session.

Shortly after the overthrow, Akina became a delegate of Kauai for the Hui Aloha ʻĀina (Hawaiian Patriotic League), a patriotic group founded to protest the overthrow and the attempts to annex Hawaii to the United States. This organization represented the case of the monarchy and the Hawaiian people to the United States Commissioner James Henderson Blount who was sent by President Grover Cleveland to investigate the overthrow.

After the establishment of the Territory of Hawaii, Akina became a member of the Home Rule Party which consisted of former royalists and Native Hawaiian leaders during the monarchy such as Robert William Wilcox who was elected the first Congressional Delegate from Hawaii under the Home Rule ticket. In 1901, Akina was elected to the inaugural Territorial Legislature established after the Hawaiian Organic Act as a Representative from the Sixth District. He presided as the first Speaker of the House of Representatives in the Hawaii Territorial Legislature while Frederick William Kahapula Beckley Jr. was Vice-Speaker.

== Later life and death ==
After his political career, Akina was ordained as a pastor on June 7, 1908. He preached in the Waimea and Hanapepe area and was a minister for the Hawaiian church at Waimea. It was reported: "His ability and intelligence, as well as fertility of resource, will add much to the Kauai ministry."

In 1918, he resigned his pastorship of the Waimea Church and moved to Honolulu to enter business. On March 16, 1919, he was appointed to the Territorial Board of Health as a herb specialist to keep records on the use and practice of traditional Hawaiian herbal medicine and served in this post until his death.

Akina died at his home in the neighborhood of Kalihi on March 16, 1920. He was buried at the cemetery of the Kawaiahaʻo Church. Akina Street in Kalihi, Honolulu is named after him.

== Bibliography ==
- Blount, James Henderson (1895). The Executive Documents of the House of Representatives for the Third Session of the Fifty-Third Congress, 1893–'94 in Thirty-Five Volumes. Washington, DC: U.S. Government Printing Office. OCLC 191710879.
- Hardy, John A. (1967). The Hardy Family in America. Vol. 1. Davis, CA: F. J. Hardy and J. E. Hardy. OCLC 430605.
- Hawaii (1918). Lydecker, Robert Colfax (ed.). Roster Legislatures of Hawaii, 1841–1918. Honolulu: Hawaiian Gazette Company. OCLC 60737418.
- Kuykendall, Ralph Simpson (1967). The Hawaiian Kingdom 1874–1893, The Kalakaua Dynasty. Vol. 3. Honolulu: University of Hawaii Press. ISBN 978-0-87022-433-1. OCLC 500374815.
- Loomis, Albertine (1963). "The Longest Legislature" (PDF). Seventy-First Annual Report of the Hawaiian Historical Society for the Year 1962. 71. Honolulu: Hawaiian Historical Society: 7–27. hdl:10524/35.
- Pukui, Mary Kawena; Elbert, Samuel H.; Mookini, Esther T. (1974). Place Names of Hawaii. Honolulu: University of Hawaii Press. ISBN 978-0-8248-0524-1. OCLC 1042464.
- Ritter, Charles F.; Wakelyn, Jon L., eds. (1989). American Legislative Leaders, 1850–1910. New York: Greenwood Press. ISBN 978-0-313-23943-4. OCLC 18523119.
- Siddall, John William (1921). Men of Hawaii. Vol. 2. Honolulu: Honolulu Star-Bulletin. OCLC 16326675.
- Williams, Ronald Jr. (2015). "Race, Power, and the Dilemma of Democracy: Hawaiʻi's First Territorial Legislature, 1901". The Hawaiian Journal of History. 49. Honolulu: Hawaiian Historical Society: 1–45. doi:10.1353/hjh.2015.0017. hdl:10524/56604. OCLC 60626541. S2CID 155592084 – via Project MUSE.
