= Kamauoha =

Kamauoha is a Hawaiian surname. Notable people with the surname include:

- George Panila Kamauoha (c. 1859–1920), Hawaiian politician
- Joseph A. Kamauoha (1861–1886), Hawaiian student
