= Joseph W. Podmore Building =

- U.S. National Register of Historic Places
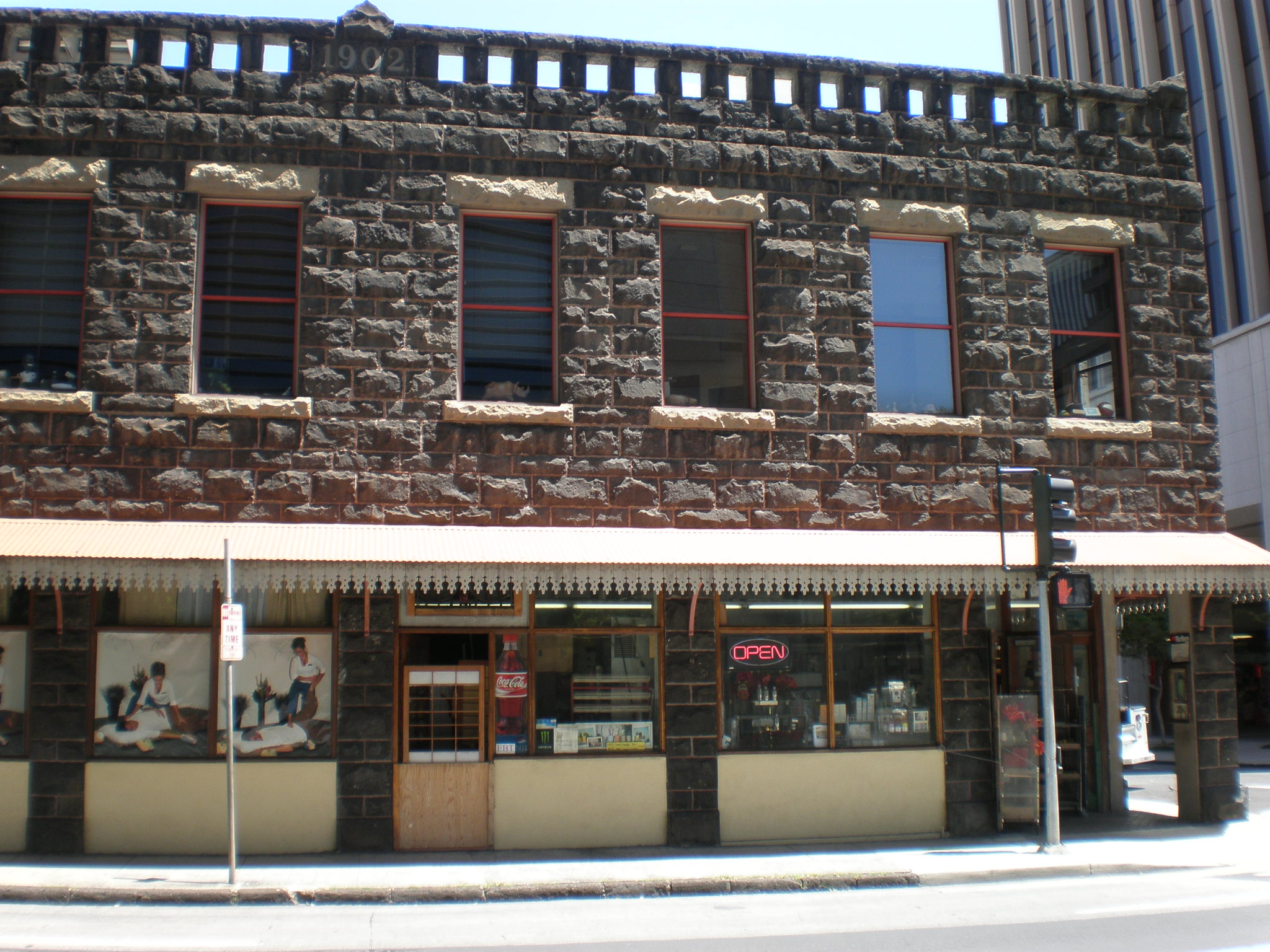
- Alakea Street side

- Location within Hawaii
- Location: 202-206 Merchant St., Honolulu, Hawaii
- Coordinates: 21°18′44″N 157°51′50″W
- Area: 0.1 acres (0.040 ha)
- Built: 1902
- Architect: Lee Wai
- Architectural style: Richardsonian Romanesque
- NRHP reference No.: 83000251
- Added to NRHP: March 24, 1983

The Joseph W. Podmore Building on the corner of Merchant and Alakea streets in Honolulu, Hawaiʻi was built in 1902 by Joseph W. Podmore, an English sailor who did business in Honolulu during the early 1900s. He built it to rent out for retail and office use, initially to a tailor and a decorator on the ground floor and to the Mercantile Printing Company upstairs. At the time it was added to the National Register of Historic Places on 24 March 1983, the Bon-Bon Cafe was its principal tenant and the name by which the building was once better known.

In 1907, Peter Cushman Jones, the property owner, donated the land and building to the local Board of Missions, who used it as their headquarters until the Mission Memorial Building was constructed in 1916. Their monthly newspaper, The Friend, was published in the print shop upstairs. Other notable tenants include the Honolulu Advertiser and the original Honolulu office of DHL Air Cargo.

Built of dark, locally quarried lava rock in a simple Richardsonian Romanesque style, the only arch is above the side doorway on Merchant Street. The main entrance is on the corner, behind a stone column. Decorative elements include a stone balustrade along the roofline, lintels and sills of lighter stone on the second-story windows, stone bands of alternating sizes (8 and 16 inches), and light reddish mortar lines.

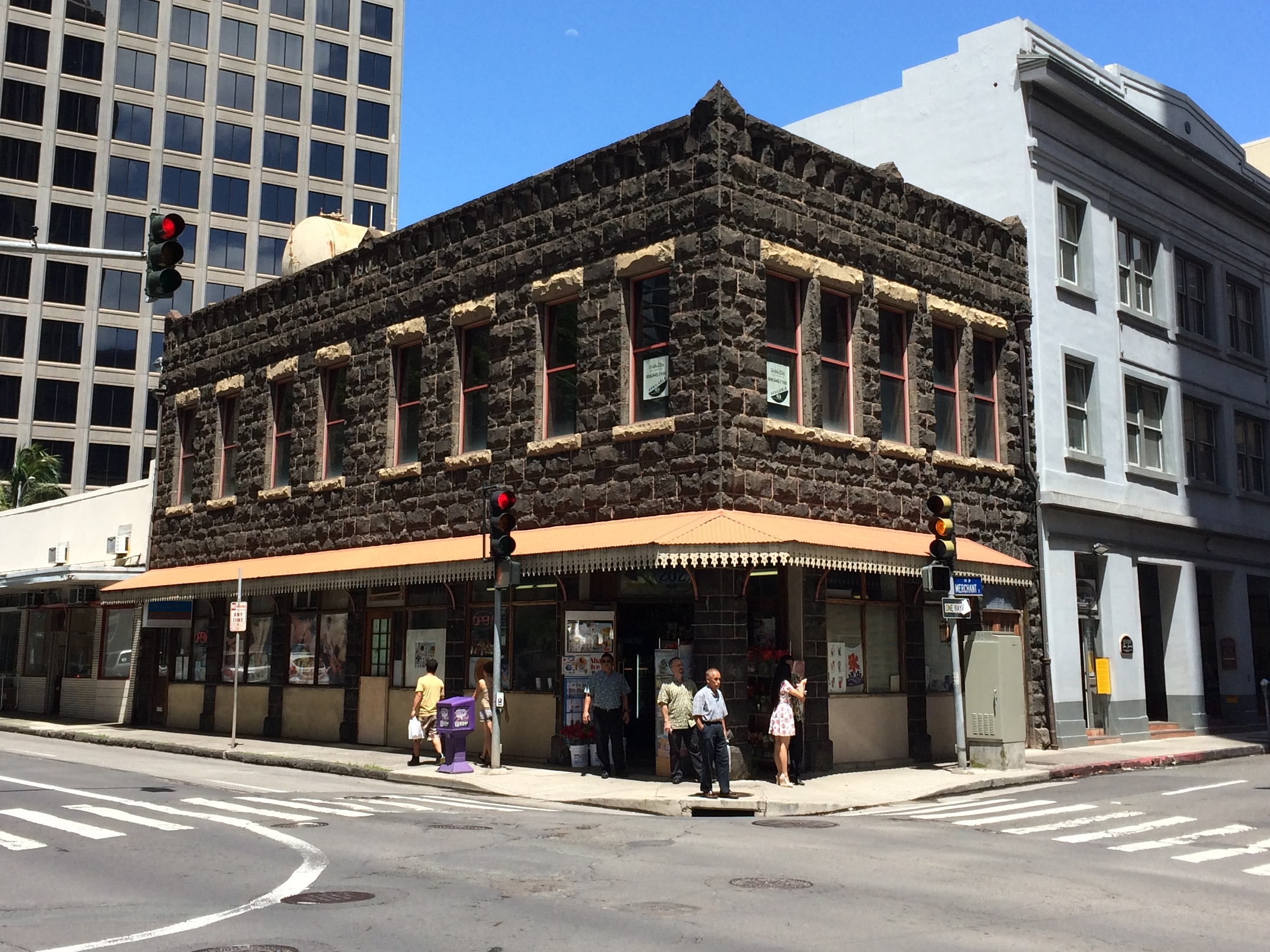
Corner view, 2014.
