= George Panila Kamauoha =

Hawaiian politician (c.1859–1920)

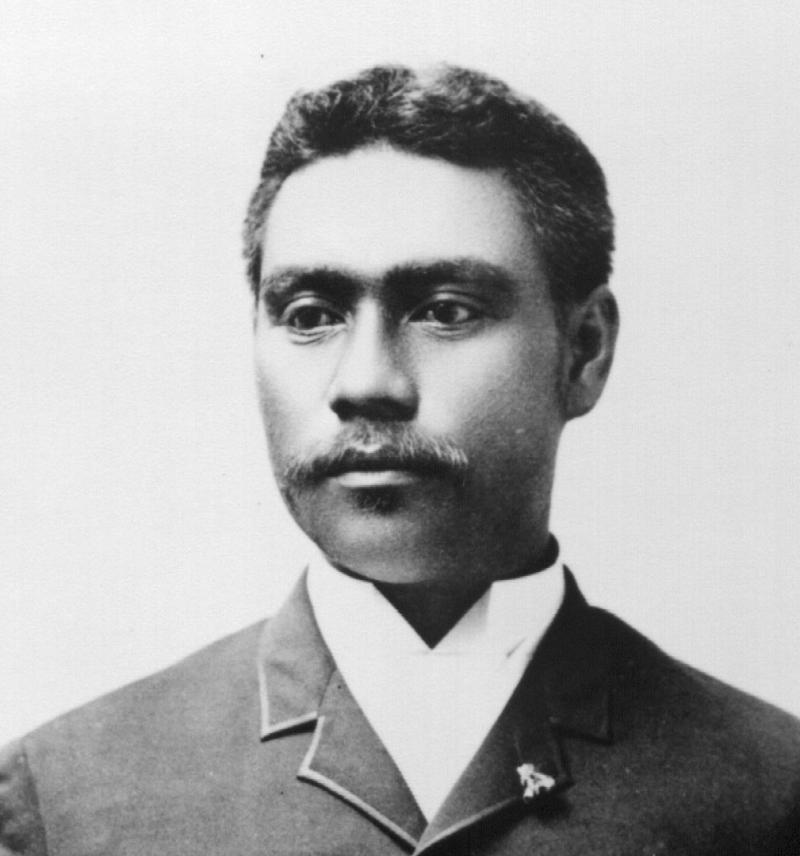

Personal details
- Born: c. 1859
- Died: April 11, 1920 Napoʻopoʻo, Territory of Hawaii
- Party: Republican; National Liberal
- Relatives: Joseph A. Kamauoha (brother)
- Occupation: Lawyer, Politician

George Panila Kamauoha (c. 1859 – April 11, 1920) was a Native Hawaiian politician of Hawaii. He served in the legislature of the Kingdom of Hawaii and the Republic of Hawaii and later in the Senate of the Territory of Hawaii.

== Life ==
One of Kamauoha's first post was working as the deputy sheriff of North Kohala. He was removed in April 1884 on charges of malfeseance and was replaced with William Pūnohu White.

From 1887, Kamauoha served as a member of the House of Representatives, the lower house of the Hawaiian legislature, for the island of Hawaii. He sat in during the special session of 1887 (November 3 to May 28) and the regular session of 1888 (from May 29 to September 11) during the reign of King Kalākaua. In the election of 1892, Kamauoha ran and was elected as a National Liberal candidate against the Reform candidate J. Kahookano. From May 28, 1892, to January 14, 1893, the legislature of the Kingdom convened for an unprecedented 171 days, which later historian Albertine Loomis dubbed the "Longest Legislature".

One subject of importance was the promulgation of a new constitution to replace the Bayonet Constitution of 1887. Representative Kamauoha was one of the legislators to present a petition from his constituents for a new constitution. Kamauoha joined his fellow members in ousting a number of the Queen Liliʻuokalani's cabinet ministers for want of confidence. During a debate to remove the George Norton Wilcox cabinet, Kamauoha noted, "the Cabinet were able and honest men. There was no doubt that they possessed the confidence of the community. They were men of integrity, who would be able to secure funds to carry on the Government. But would they carry out the wishes of the Queen? Would they do what the Queen and the Hawaiian people wanted in regard to the Lottery, the Constitutional Convention, etc. Would they do as the Queen wanted them to?"

The monarchy was overthrown on January 17, 1893, and after a brief transition under Provisional Government the Republic of Hawaii was established on July 4, 1894. Despite his native ancestry and previous service under the deposed queen, Kamauoha became a legislator for the new regime. He was elected as a member of the House of Representatives for the Second District and served as the Vice Speaker of the Legislature of the Republic of Hawaii from 1895 to 1896. He was licensed to practice law in 1895. Hawaii was annexed to the United States in 1898 via the Newlands Resolution. From July 31, 1899, to July 23, 1900, he worked in the Tax Appeal Court, 3rd Circuit. He became a member of the Senate of the Territory of Hawaii from 1917 to 1919. He ran as member of the Republican Party.

Kamauoha died from a relapse of influenza, on April 11, 1920, at his home at Napoʻopoʻo, South Kona. His maternal granddaughter was kumu hula Iolani Luahine.

== Bibliography ==
- Blount, James Henderson (1895). The Executive Documents of the House of Representatives for the Third Session of the Fifty-Third Congress, 1893–'94 in Thirty-Five Volumes. Washington, DC: U.S. Government Printing Office. OCLC 191710879.
- Hawaii (1918). Lydecker, Robert Colfax (ed.). Roster Legislatures of Hawaii, 1841–1918. Honolulu: Hawaiian Gazette Company. OCLC 60737418.
- Kuykendall, Ralph Simpson (1967). The Hawaiian Kingdom 1874–1893, The Kalakaua Dynasty. Vol. 3. Honolulu: University of Hawaii Press. ISBN 978-0-87022-433-1. OCLC 500374815.
- Loomis, Albertine (1963). "The Longest Legislature" (PDF). Seventy-First Annual Report of the Hawaiian Historical Society for the Year 1962. 71. Honolulu: Hawaiian Historical Society: 7–27. hdl:10524/35.
