= Arthur P. Peterson =

American lawyer

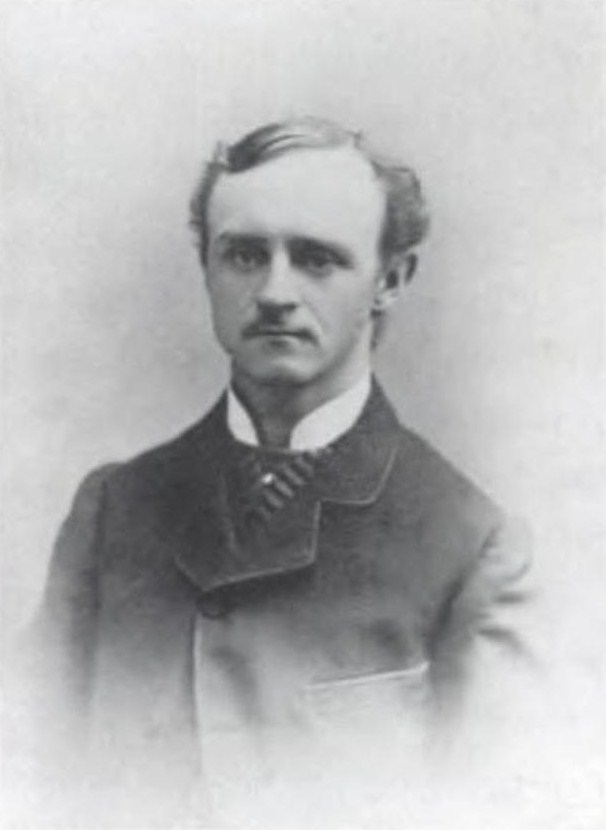

Kingdom of Hawaii Attorney General
- In office June 17, 1890 – February 25, 1891
- Monarch: Kalakaua
- Preceded by: Clarence W. Ashford
- Succeeded by: William A. Whiting
- In office January 13, 1893 – January 17, 1893
- Monarch: Liliuokalani
- Preceded by: Cecil Brown
- Succeeded by: William Owen Smith

Personal details
- Born: November 21, 1858 New Bedford, Massachusetts
- Died: March 16, 1895 (aged 36) San Francisco, California
- Resting place: Oahu Cemetery
- Education: Punahou School; University of Michigan Law School
- Occupation: Lawyer, Politician, Newspaper Editor

Arthur Porter Peterson (November 21, 1858 – March 16, 1895) was a lawyer and politician of the Kingdom of Hawaii. He served two separate terms as Attorney General of Hawaii and was a member of Queen Liliuokalani's last cabinet before the Overthrow of the Kingdom of Hawaii. He was arrested and jailed by the Republic of Hawaii in the aftermath of the 1895 Counter-Revolution and then exiled to San Francisco where he died of pneumonia.

== Early life ==
Peterson was born November 21, 1858, in New Bedford, Massachusetts, of Puritan heritage. His parents were Daniel Porter Peterson and Jerusha Morey Clark. In 1870, at the age of eleven, he and his family settled in the Hawaiian Islands. He was educated at Punahou School in Honolulu, and returned to the United States where he graduated from University of Michigan Law School. He was admitted to the Plymouth County bar and started his law practice in Boston. While in Boston, he also helped established, with William E. Chase, a local newspaper called The Daily Bee.

== Career in Hawaii ==
After returning to Hawaii, he served as Deputy Attorney General under Attorneys General Antone Rosa and Clarence W. Ashford for two years and retired in March 1890, to return to private law practice. In April 1890, he was appointed Notary Public for the First Judicial Circuit of the Kingdom.

In June 1890, King Kalakaua appointed him Attorney General of Hawaii as a part of the Cummins Cabinet, a position he held from June 17, 1890, to February 25, 1891. In January 1891, Kalākaua died while abroad in California and his sister ascended to the throne as Queen Liliuokalani. After the accession of the new sovereign, it was customary for the hold-over cabinet of the deceased monarch to resign, but the Cummins Cabinet refused the queen's request for them to resign citing the 1887 Constitution which only gave the legislature the power to the dismiss cabinet ministers. They asked for a ruling by the Hawaii Supreme Court, and the justices (except for one dissenting opinion) ruled in favor of the queen's decision, and the ministers resigned.

In 1892, he was elected as a member of the House of Nobles for the island of Oahu as a member of the National Reform Party. During the 1892–1893 legislative assembly, Peterson lost the respect of the haole (foreign) community when he became the only white legislator to vote for the lottery bill. On January 13, 1893, Queen Liliuokalani re-appointed him as Attorney General to the final Parker Cabinet with Samuel Parker, William H. Cornwell, and John F. Colburn after her previous cabinet was voted out by the legislature. She had chosen these men specifically to support her plan of promulgating a new constitution while the legislature was not in session. She attempted to promulgate a new constitution, but Peterson and the rest of the cabinet were either opposed to or reluctant to sign the new constitution. Their opposition was one of the causes which ultimately led to her overthrow by the Committee of Safety. After the overthrow, Peterson and the rest of the Parker Cabinet were removed from office.

== Imprisonment, exile and death ==
In between his political involvements, Peterson continued his private practice in Honolulu and "was the acknowledged head of his profession in Hawaii having established for himself a reputation for ability and integrity excelled by none at the Hawaiian bar". In the aftermath of the unsuccessful 1895 Counter-Revolution, Peterson and other royalists were arrested and imprisoned by the forces loyal to the Republic of Hawaii. He was detained in Oahu Prison under conditions which later proved detrimental to his health. After his release, he was exiled along with former Attorney General Charles F. Creighton and other political dissidents to San Francisco. The conditions of his imprisonment weakened his physical health and Peterson died of pneumonia on March 16, 1895. According to Creighton, his last words were "I've got out of jail." He was survived by his wife Nettie Lincoln Brown (1865–1953) and daughter Myra Peterson (1886–1973) who were residing in Onset, Massachusetts, at the time of his death. He was buried at the Oahu Cemetery in Honolulu.

== Bibliography ==
- Allen, Helena G. (1982). The Betrayal of Liliuokalani: Last Queen of Hawaii, 1838–1917. Glendale, CA: A. H. Clark Company. ISBN 978-0-87062-144-4. OCLC 9576325.
- Blount, James Henderson (1895). The Executive Documents of the House of Representatives for the Third Session of the Fifty-Third Congress, 1893–'94 in Thirty-Five Volumes. Washington, DC: U.S. Government Printing Office. OCLC 191710879.
- Hawaii (1918). Lydecker, Robert Colfax (ed.). Roster Legislatures of Hawaii, 1841–1918. Honolulu: Hawaiian Gazette Company. OCLC 60737418.
- Kuykendall, Ralph Simpson (1967). The Hawaiian Kingdom 1874–1893, The Kalakaua Dynasty. Vol. 3. Honolulu: University of Hawaii Press. ISBN 978-0-87022-433-1. OCLC 500374815.
- Liliuokalani (1898). Hawaii's Story by Hawaii's Queen, Liliuokalani. Boston: Lee and Shepard. ISBN 978-0-548-22265-2. OCLC 2387226.
- Twigg-Smith, Thurston (1998). Hawaiian Sovereignty: Do the Facts Matter?. Honolulu: Goodale Publishing. ISBN 978-0-9662945-0-7. OCLC 39090004.
