= Kyoto Gardens of Honolulu Memorial Park =

- U.S. National Register of Historic Places
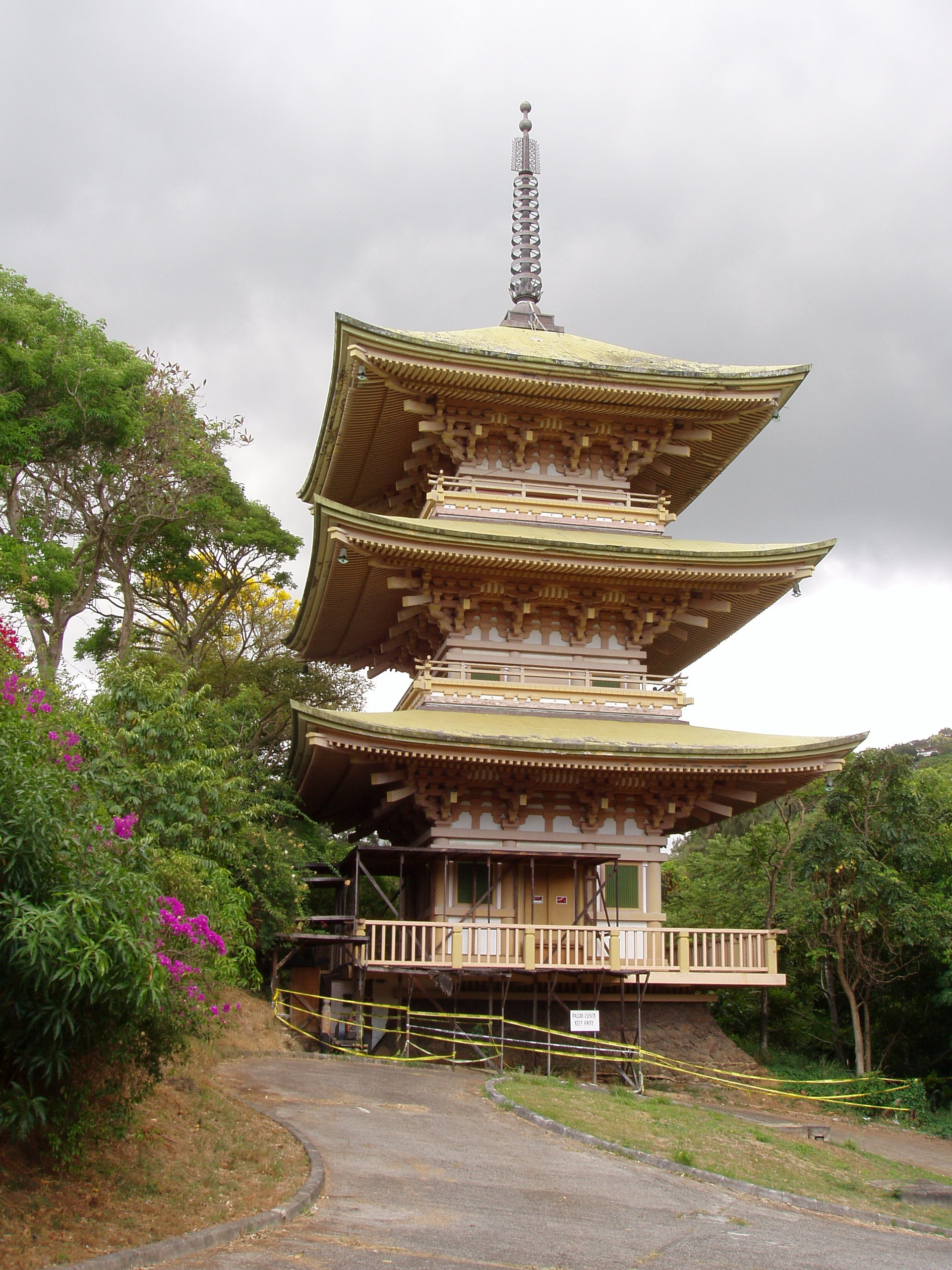
- Sanju Pagoda

- Location within Hawaii
- Location: 22 Craigside Place, Honolulu, Hawaii
- Coordinates: 21°19′21″N 157°50′51″W
- Area: 2.2 acres (0.89 ha)
- Built: 1966
- Architect: Katsuyoshi, Robert; et al.
- Architectural style: Japonism
- NRHP reference No.: 04000020
- Added to NRHP: February 11, 2004

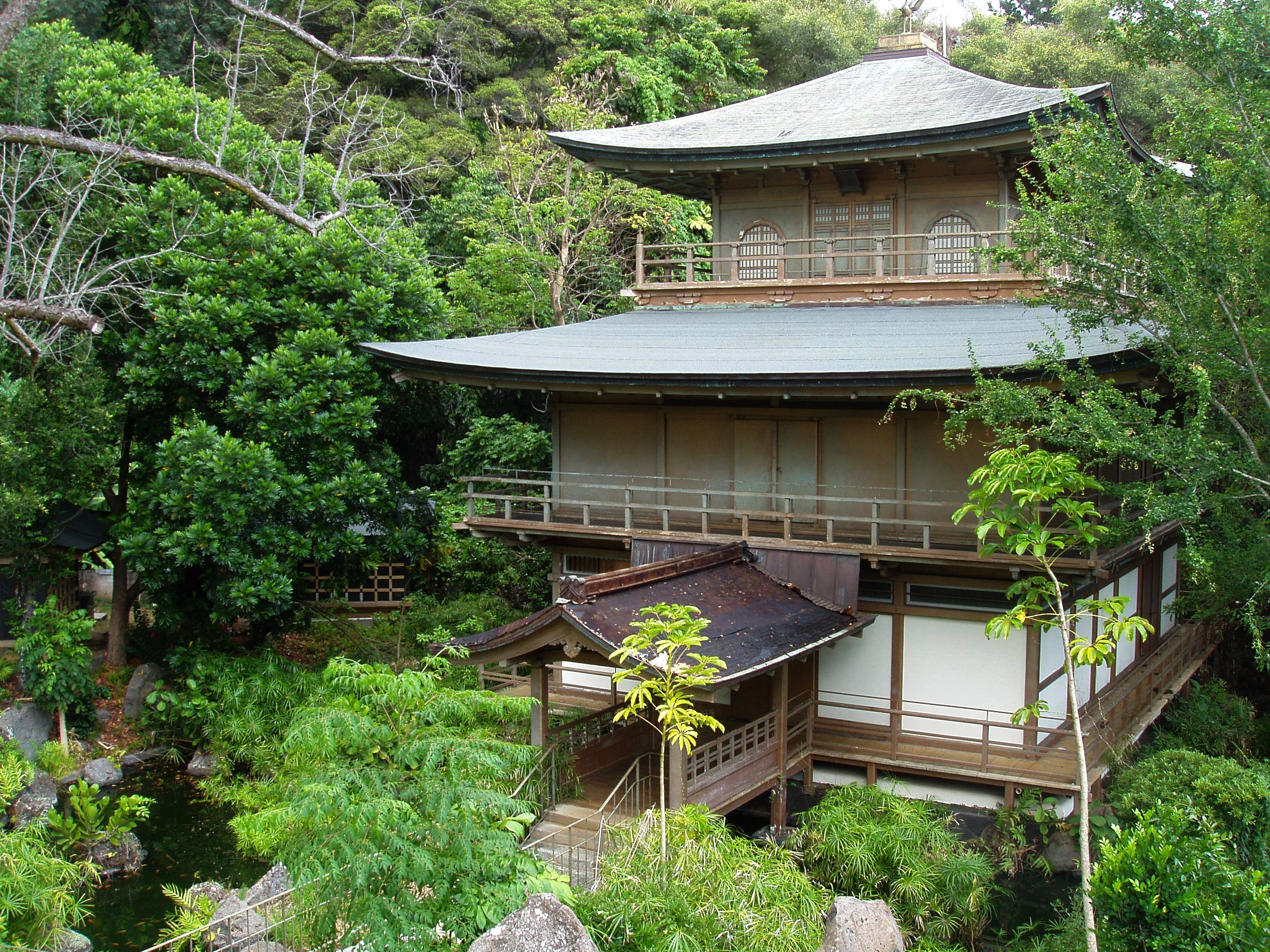
Kinkaku-ji with Mirror Lake Garden.

The Kyoto Gardens of Honolulu Memorial Park (Japanese: ホノルル・メモリアルパーク京都庭園, Honoruru Memoriaru Pāku Kyōto Teien) is a cemetery located in the eastern half of the Honolulu Memorial Park, 22 Craigside Place, Honolulu, Hawaii. Its three-tiered Sanju Pagoda, the Kinkaku-ji Temple, and Mirror Gardens are fine examples of Japanese traditional-style structures and gardens built outside Japan. The gardens were listed in the National Register of Historic Places as site 04000020 on February 11, 2004.

Honolulu Memorial Park was established in 1958, and its Buddhist Kinkaku-ji memorial and Sanju Pagoda were constructed between 1964 and 1966 as part of the Nuʻuanu Memorial Gardens Funerary Home, adjacent to history Oahu Cemetery. This name was changed to Kyoto Gardens in 1966 when the City of Kyoto, Japan, donated a bronze bell, with Abbot Jikai Murakami of Kyoto's Kinkaku-ji present for the opening.

- The Sanju Pagoda is modeled after the Hokke-ji Temple (Kanji: 南法華寺) in Nara, Japan which was built in the Momoyama period (1571–1602). The garden replica is built of concrete and steel, and somewhat larger than the original with a height from foundation to rooftop of 80 feet. Including the ku-rin copper spire, its total height is 116 feet.
- The Kinkaku-ji (Kanji: 金閣寺) columbarium is modeled upon the renowned Kinkaku-ji (Golden Pavilion) located on the grounds of the Rokuonji Temple in Kyoto, built in the Muromachi period (1335–1573). It is three stories tall (38 feet), constructed with steel frame and plaster finish, and with a phoenix finial at its roof peak.
- Mirror Lake Garden, surrounding Kinkaku-ji, also reflects Muromachi period (1335–1573) garden design.

Both the Sanju Pagoda and Kinkaku-ji serve as columbariums. As of 2006 they were in poor repair, due to the cemetery's financial difficulties.
