= Peter Cushman Jones =

- Jones in 1898

Minister of Finance
- In office November 8, 1892 – January 12, 1893
- Monarch: Liliʻuokalani
- In office January 17, 1893 – March 15, 1893
- President: Sanford B. Dole

Personal details
- Born: October 12, 1837 Boston
- Died: April 23, 1922 (aged 84) Honolulu
- Spouse: Cornelia Hall
- Occupation: Businessman, Politician

Peter Cushman Jones (October 12, 1837 – April 23, 1922) was a businessman and politician during the Kingdom of Hawaii, Provisional Government of Hawaii, Republic of Hawaii and Territory of Hawaii. He founded the second bank in the Hawaiian Islands and served as the government's Minister of Finance.

== Early life ==
Peter Cushman Jones was born December 10, 1837, in Boston. His father was also named Peter Cushman Jones (1808–1885), and his mother was Jane MacIntosh Baldwin, whose grandfather Isaac Baldwin (1738–1775) died in the Battle of Bunker Hill. He traces his ancestry to several notable early Bostonians, including Thomas Dudley (1576–1653) and daughter Anne Dudley who married Simon Bradstreet. He was fourth of nine children.

He was educated at the Boston Latin School in 1849. However, as he describes himself:

As a scholar I was extremely dull, I never remember having been at the head of my class at school but have many times been at the other end of the class, the "foot."

Although his parents expected him to attend Harvard, he transferred to a less disciplined school briefly and then took a job instead in April 1852 at age 14. He would never go back to school. In 1857 he decided to leave, and planned to go west to Saint Paul, Minnesota. His father objected, so instead he left in June 1857 to Honolulu, since William Austin Whiting, the son of his employer, had been there. He arrived on October 2, 1857, with total assets of 16 cents.

He found various jobs as clerk with former New Englanders in the islands. On May 12, 1862, he married Cornelia Hall (1842–1876), daughter of merchant and government minister Edwin Oscar Hall, and on February 27, 1864, he officially became a citizen of the Kingdom of Hawaii.

== Business and politics ==
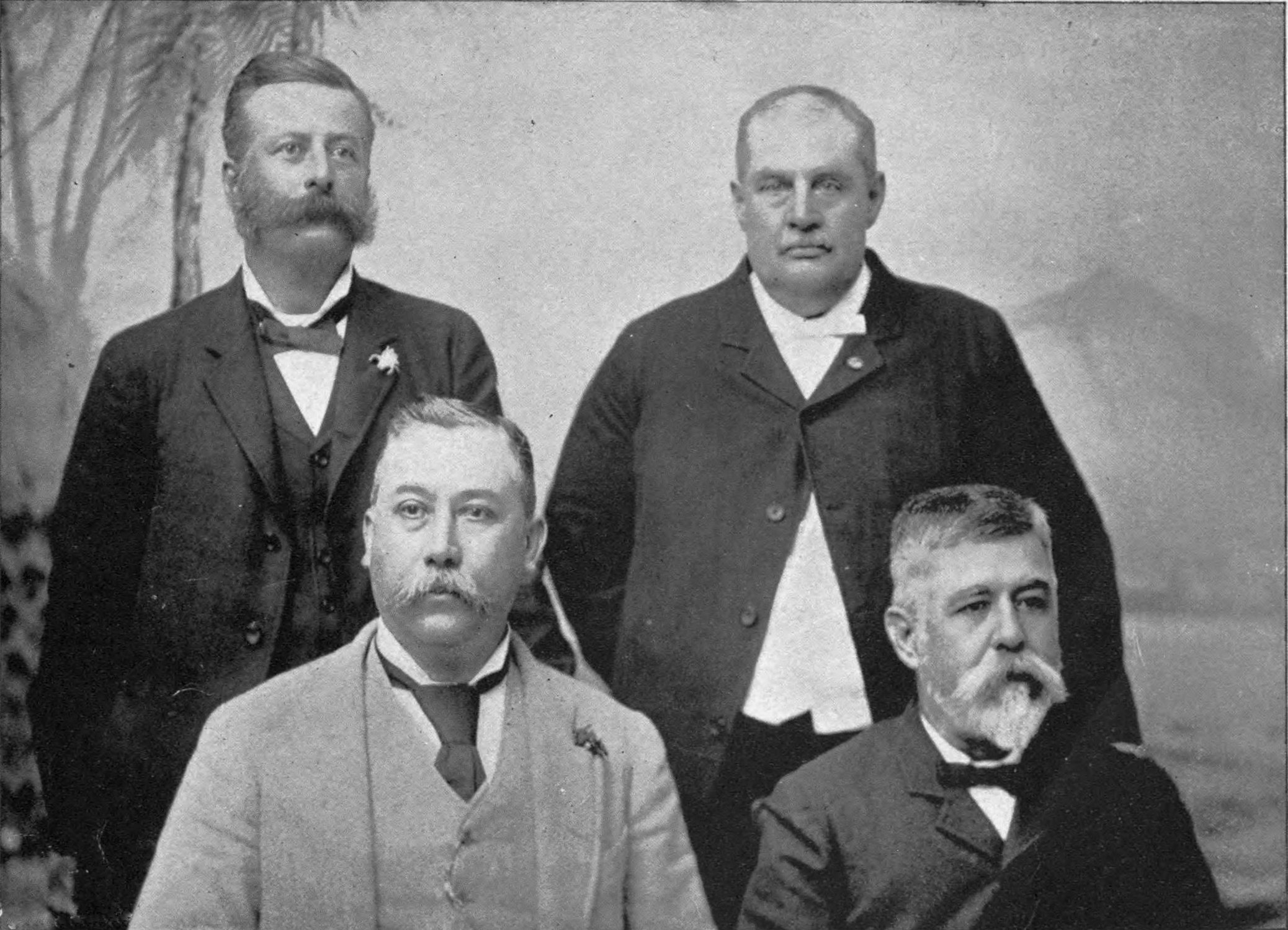
1892 Cabinet, second from right

By 1866 he bought out a former employer and formed a partnership with C. L. Richards in a ship chandlery business. In January 1871 he became a partner with Henry A. P. Carter in C. Brewer & Co. which acted as agent for the growing number of sugarcane plantations in Hawaii. In December 1879, while Carter was away on a diplomatic mission, the other partner John D. Brewer died, making him effectively head of the business. In 1883 the company was formally incorporated with himself as president, including Charles Reed Bishop as an investor. Bishop had founded the first bank in the Hawaiian Islands, called, appropriately, First Hawaiian Bank. Jones managed C. Brewer until July 1891. He returned with his family to Boston to visit relatives, and then came back to Honolulu in October 1892.

On November 8, 1892 Queen Liliʻuokalani appointed Jones minister of finance with George Norton Wilcox as interior minister. This cabinet served until January 12, 1893. A few days later the overthrow of the Kingdom of Hawaii ended the monarchy. He was appointed to the Executive Council of the Provisional Government of Hawaii, as its minister of finance on January 17, 1893, but served only until March 15.

He founded the Hawaiian Safe Deposit and Investment company in 1892 with his son. By 1894 he became president of C. Brewer again until 1899. George R. Carter became manager of the business and it was later renamed the Hawaiian Trust Company. In December 1897 he officially chartered the Bank of Hawaii with Charles Montague Cooke, Joseph Ballard Atherton.

== Philanthropy ==
Jones funded the Palama Chapel in the working-class neighborhood of Kapālama on June 2, 1896. After the January 1900 Chinatown fire, the chapel provided health care for some of the people left homeless, but resources ran low by 1904. Doremus Scudder invited James Arthur Rath and Ragna Helsher Rath who arrived in 1905 and added social services to the center and called it Palama Settlement by September 1906. In 1902 Jones leased some land to English merchant Joseph W. Podmore, who built the Joseph W. Podmore Building and then sold the lease back to Jones. Jones donated both the land and building to the Hawaiian Evangelical Board on February 7, 1907, for their use until a permanent home was built for them in 1916.

== Death and legacy ==
Jones died on April 23, 1922. He was buried in Oahu Cemetery. Son Edwin Austin Jones, was born May 11, 1863, married Belle Fuller on November 8, 1888, had four children, served as cashier of Bank of Hawaii, but died on July 10, 1898. He also had two daughters. Ada Jones was born October 28, 1869, married Alonzo Gartley on June 12, 1894, and had four children. Alice Hall Jones was born January 2, 1880, and married Abraham Lewis, Jr. on April 26, 1906.

Government offices
Preceded by William H. Cornwell	Kingdom of Hawaii Minister of Finance; November 1892 – January 1893	Succeeded by William H. Cornwell
Preceded by William H. Cornwell	Provisional Government of Hawaii Minister of Finance; January 1893 – March 1893	Succeeded by Theodore C. Porter
