= John F. Colburn =

Hawaiian politician

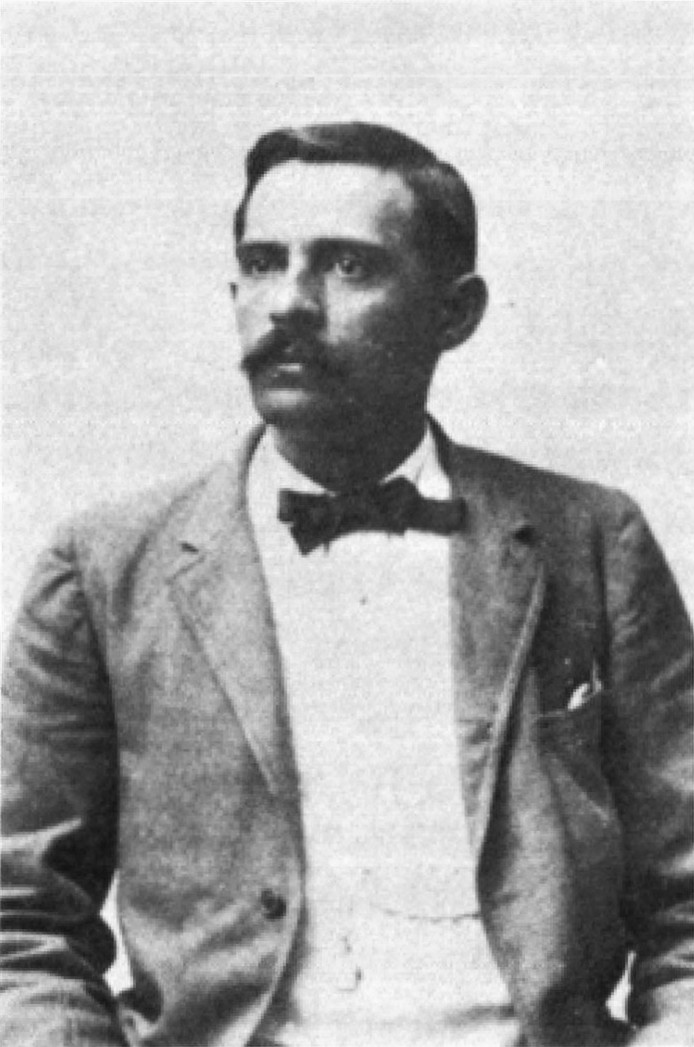

Kingdom of Hawaii Minister of the Interior
- In office January 13, 1893 – January 17, 1893
- Monarch: Liliuokalani
- Preceded by: George Norton Wilcox
- Succeeded by: James A. King

Personal details
- Born: September 30, 1859 Honolulu, Kingdom of Hawaii
- Died: March 16, 1920 (aged 60) Honolulu, Territory of Hawaii
- Resting place: Oahu Cemetery

John Francis Colburn (September 30, 1859 – March 16, 1920) was a businessman and politician of the Kingdom of Hawaii. He served as the last Minister of the Interior to Queen Liliuokalani. Even though he was part Hawaiian ancestry on his maternal side, Colburn was a key figure in the overthrow of the Hawaiian monarchy and was a proponent of annexation to the United States. Colburn was the treasurer of the estate of Queen Kapiolani.

== Early life ==
He was born as John Francis Colburn II in Honolulu, the youngest of three children of auctioneer and local fire warden John Francis Colburn and Elizabeth Maughan, descended from Don Francisco de Paula Marín and one of his Hawaiian wives. The elder Colburn was a naturalized citizen of Hawaii who could trace his family back to the Siege of Boston at the 1775 Battle of Bunker Hill; when he died in 1861, the younger Colburn was only two years old. Elizabeth Maughan died May 22, 1889.

== Political career ==
Early in 1892, Colburn ran for a position on the Road Board, and came in ninth in a field of thirteen candidates. Soon afterwards, however, Queen Liliuokalani appointed him to the Board of Health. On January 13, 1893, she appointed him to the Ministry of the Interior to the final Parker Cabinet with Samuel Parker, William H. Cornwell and Arthur P. Peterson, after her previous cabinet was voted out by the legislature of the kingdom. She had chosen these men specifically to support her plan of promulgating a new constitution while the legislature was not in session.

Publisher and philanthropist Thurston Twigg-Smith, the grandson of annexation leader Lorrin A. Thurston, made the case that Colburn was part of a royal inner cabal of the queen's own cabinet ministers who worked to oust the monarchy. She attempted to promulgate a new constitution, (Note: Historian Ralph S. Kuykendall noted in 1961 that most Hawaiians were supportive of a strong monarchy, and resented the Bayonet Constitution they felt had been forced upon King Kalākaua. When Liliuokalani was elected upon his death, her ability to govern was limited by a fractured legislature and the terms of the Bayonet Constitution. Her proposed new constitution was similar to the 1864 constitution in effect prior to the forced Bayonet Constitution. Kuykendall & Day 1961, pp. 171–177; Thurston Twigg-Smith was strongly opposed to Hawaiian Sovereignty. His perspective of the queen's proposed new constitution was that it would weaken the power of the legislature and be a move back to an absolute monarchy. Twigg-Smith 1998, pp. xv, 10) but Colburn and the rest of the cabinet were either opposed to or reluctant to sign the new constitution. Their opposition was one of the causes which ultimately led to her overthrow.

The Committee of Safety was being formed on January 14 and was in the process of drawing up a petition for 700–800 gathered opposition participants, when Colburn and Peterson arrived, joined at some point by Cornwell and Parker. Speaking before the large crowd, Colburn revealed the details of a meeting the ministers had just had with the queen to discuss the proposed constitution, rousing the crowd to prepare for action. After an hours-long meeting to digest the information presented by Colburn, the Committee of Safety headed by Thurston joined with the ministers in defying the plans for a new constitution, believing there was no alternative but to remove her from power. The cabinet ministers were all present during the overnight session and fully briefed on the committee's plan of action by the following morning, January 15.

Liliuokalani has abdicated and my hands are untied. Annexation is now the goal for me.

— John F. Colburn, 1895

Liliuokalani was deposed by the Committee of Safety on January 17 and replaced by the Provisional Government, who also removed Colburn and the rest of the cabinet. Simultaneously, the USS Boston was in Honolulu Harbor, and United States Minister John L. Stevens brought the marines ashore, ostensibly to protect American assets, but what has historically been viewed as part of a wider conspiracy to seize the Hawaiian Islands. A week later, Colburn resigned from the Board of Health rather than sign a loyalty oath to the provisional government.

In February 1893, Colburn wrote a letter to his uncle-in-law J. H. Ganz in Missouri detailing the events of the overthrow; Ganz in turn forwarded the letter to President Benjamin Harrison, with a cover letter of his own. The two missives together were reprinted in numerous newspapers in the United States. Grover Cleveland succeeded Harrison as president on March 4, and dispatched Congressman James Henderson Blount to investigate the events, and the resulting report concluded that Stevens had acted in coordination with the conspirators. (Note: The United States Senate subsequently launched their own investigation, published as the Morgan Report, and cleared Stevens of any wrongdoing in the overthrow. Kuykendall & Day 1961, pp. 178–179; Twigg-Smith 1998, p. 39; Blume 2016, pp. 68–69)

In spite of the role he played in the overthrow, in October 1893 Colburn penned a letter to Celso Caesar Moreno, Kalakaua's former Prime Minister of Hawaii, asking for restoration of the monarchy and indemnity for the royalists. A year later, he petitioned the Republic of Hawaii for his unpaid four days of salary before the overthrow. After Liliuokalani abdicated on January 24, 1895, Colburn became temporary chairman of Hawaiians for Annexation.

== Later life and family ==
Upon the death of Queen Kapiolani on June 24, 1899, Prince David Kawānanakoa and Prince Jonah Kūhiō Kalanianaʻole were appointed administrators of her estate. With the formation of Kapiolani Estate Limited, Kawānanakoa was elected as president, Kūhiō as vice president, and Colburn as treasurer. Morris Kahai Keohokalole was elected as the secretary and auditor. A dispute between Kuhio and Colburn in 1916 led to Colburn's resigning from his position with the estate.

Prior to his political career, Colburn served as the company auditor for the Kona Coffee and Fruit Co. Ltd., and imported and sold hay and grain. After the overthrow of the monarchy, he ran a restaurant and had success as an oyster farmer.

On December 4, 1890, Colburn married Julia Naoho (1859–1916), a relative of Samuel Kamakau. He had nine children with her and adopted the five children she had with his first husband Charles Long, including Territory of Hawaii legislators Carlos A. Long and Elia A. C. Long. She preceded him in death on March 23, 1916.

His older brother Marcus Rexford Colburn died March 20, 1901, of a prolonged illness. The eldest of the Colburn siblings, sister Sarah (Mrs. Gilbert) Parmenter, died in 1903 from a gunshot wound to the head, inflicted by her former son-in-law E. M. Jones during a family dispute in which her daughter was murdered.

Colburn died at his home in Honolulu, on March 16, 1920, at the age of sixty. He was buried at the Oahu Cemetery in Honolulu.
