= William H. Cornwell =

American businessman, military colonel and politician

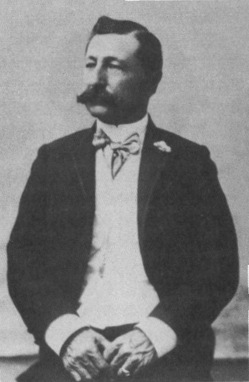

Kingdom of Hawaii Minister of Finance
- In office November 1, 1892 – November 8, 1892
- Monarch: Liliuokalani
- Preceded by: Edward C. Macfarlane
- Succeeded by: Peter Cushman Jones
- In office January 13, 1893 – January 17, 1893
- Monarch: Liliuokalani
- Preceded by: Peter Cushman Jones
- Succeeded by: Peter Cushman Jones

Personal details
- Born: May 30, 1843 Brooklyn, New York
- Died: November 18, 1903 (aged 60) Waikapu. Territory of Hawaii
- Resting place: Oahu Cemetery

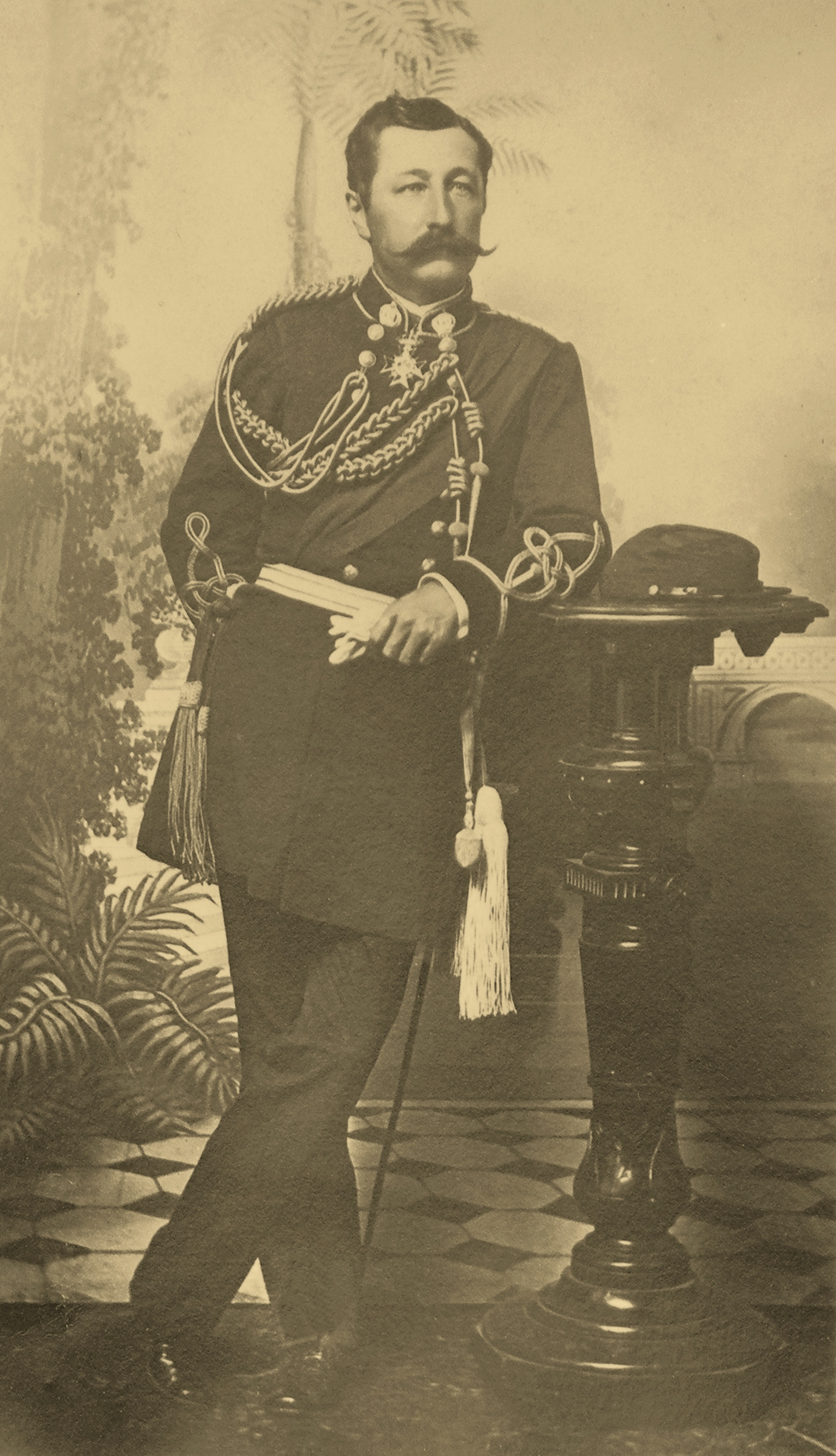
Col. William H. Cornwell in the military uniform of the Hawaiian royal court

William Henry Cornwell (May 30, 1843 – November 18, 1903) was an American businessman, as well as a military colonel and politician of the Kingdom of Hawaii. He served two separate terms as Minister of Finance and was a member of Queen Liliuokalani's last cabinet before the Overthrow of the Kingdom of Hawaii.

== Early life ==
He was born in Brooklyn, New York, and relocated to Hawaii at an early age with his family where they became involved in sheep ranching in Waimea. He formed a partnership with James Louzada for a sugar cane plantation on Maui, which was later sold to Claus Spreckels. Cornwell became a horse breeder, president of the Hawaiian Jockey Club, and a participant in the sport of horse racing.

== Political career ==
Cornwell held the rank of Major and later Colonel, as a staff member under both King Kalākaua and Queen Liliuokalani. During the 1890 legislative assembly, Cornwell served as a member of the House of Nobles, the upper house of the legislature, for the island of Maui. He continued his term in the House during the legislative session of 1892–93, which became known as the "Longest Legislature" for its unprecedented duration of 171 days. On November 1, 1892, he was appointed by Queen Liliuokalani as Minister of Finance and to form the short lived Cornwell Cabinet which consisted of Joseph Nāwahī, Charles T. Gulick and Charles F. Creighton. This cabinet existed for less than a day when it was ousted by the legislature with a vote of 26 to 13. He was re-elected to his vacant legislative seat on December 5.

On January 13, 1893, Queen Liliuokalani re-appointed him as Minister of Finance to the Parker Cabinet with Samuel Parker, John F. Colburn and Arthur P. Peterson after the previous Wilcox cabinet was voted out by the legislature the day before. She had chosen these men specifically to support her plan of promulgating a new constitution while the legislature was not in session.

Publisher and philanthropist Thurston Twigg-Smith, the grandson of annexation leader Lorrin A. Thurston, made the case that Cornwell was part of a royal inner cabal of the queen's own cabinet ministers who worked to oust the monarchy. She attempted to promulgate a new constitution, but Cornwell and the rest of the cabinet were either opposed to or reluctant to sign the new constitution. Their opposition was one of the causes which ultimately led to her overthrow by the Committee of Safety headed by Thurston. After the overthrow, Cornwell and the rest of the Parker Cabinet were removed from office.

After the overthrow of the monarchy and the annexation of Hawaii to the United States, Cornwell became a member of the Democratic Party and served as a delegate to 1900 Democratic National Convention for the Territory of Hawaii. He died at his home at Waikapu, Maui, on November 18, 1903, of heart disease. His remains were taken to Honolulu for his funeral and he was buried at the Oahu Cemetery in Honolulu.

== Personal life ==
He married twice: Blanche Macfarlane (1853–1880) and Josephine Colvin, who survived him, and had three children by his first wife: William Henry Cornwell, Jr., Blanche C. Walker. wife of J. S. Walker, Jr.; and Kate J. Braymer, wife of A. A. Braymer.
