= Waikapū, Hawaii =

Waikapū
- Census-designated place
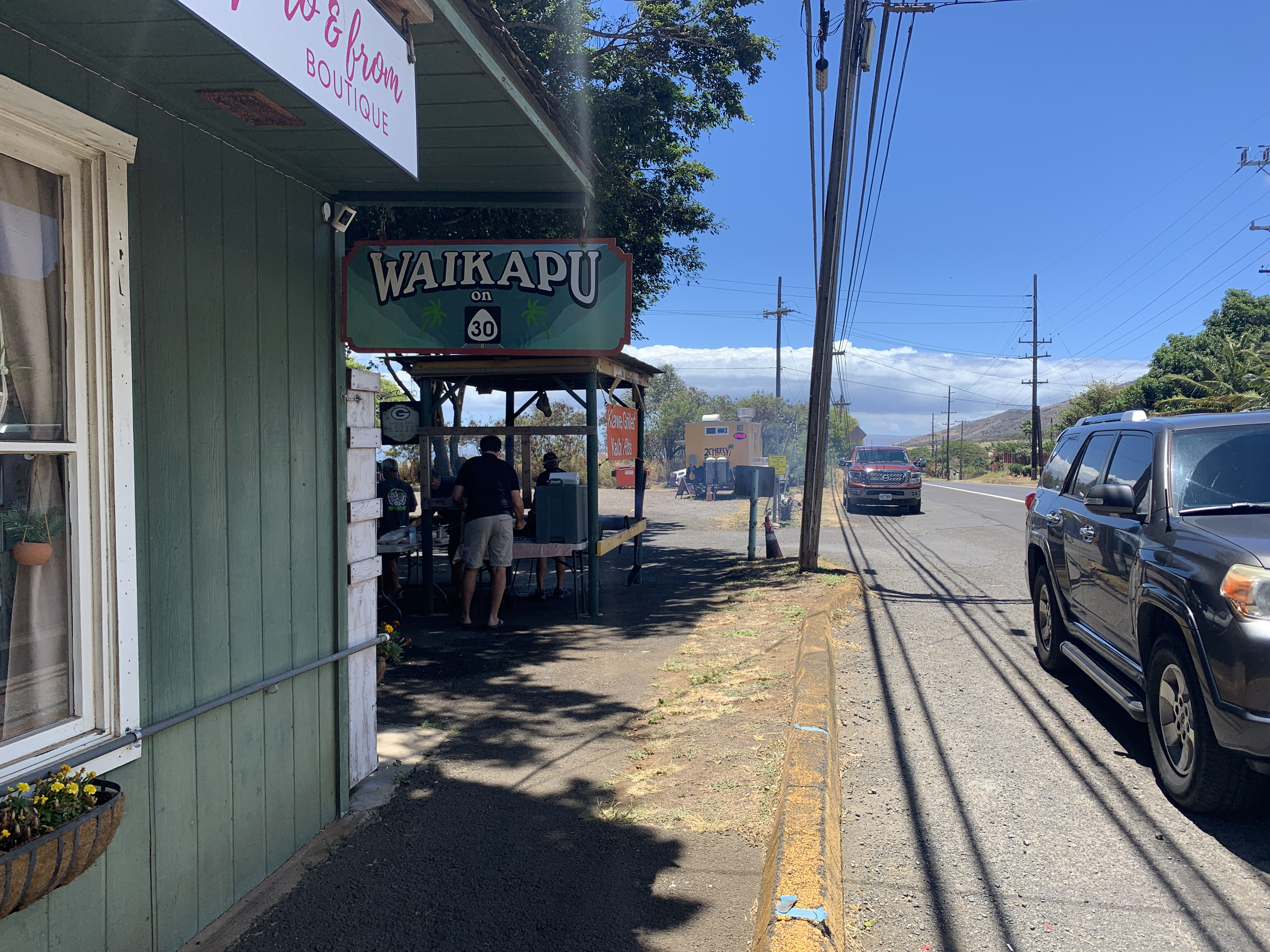

- Location in Maui County and the state of Hawaii
- Coordinates: 20°51′10″N 156°30′36″W
- Country: United States
- State: Hawaii
- County: Maui

Area
  - Total: 11.04 sq mi (28.59 km^{2})
  - Land: 11.02 sq mi (28.54 km^{2})
  - Water: 0.019 sq mi (0.05 km^{2})
- Elevation: 482 ft (147 m)

Population (2020)
  - Total: 3,437
  - Density: 311.9/sq mi (120.43/km^{2})
- Time zone: UTC-10 (Hawaii-Aleutian)
- Area code: 808
- FIPS code: 15-75950
- GNIS feature ID: 0364664

Waikapū is a census-designated place (CDP) in Maui County, Hawaii, United States. The population was 3,437 at the 2020 census.

== Geography ==
Waikapū is located at 20°51′10″N 156°30′36″W (20.852844, -156.510014).

According to the United States Census Bureau, the CDP has a total area of 11.0 square miles (28 km^{2}), of which 11.0 square miles (28 km^{2}) is land and 0.04 square miles (0.10 km^{2}), or 0.18%, is water.

== Demographics ==
Historical population
Census	Pop.	Note	%±
2020	3,437		—
U.S. Decennial Census

As of the census of 2000, there were 1,115 people, 347 households, and 274 families residing in the CDP. The population density was 101.6 inhabitants per square mile (39.2/km^{2}). There were 360 housing units at an average density of 32.8 per square mile (12.7/km^{2}). The racial makeup of the CDP was 15.25% White, 0.36% African American, 0.27% Native American, 48.61% Asian, 9.60% Pacific Islander, 0.54% from other races, and 25.38% from two or more races. Hispanic or Latino of any race were 6.10% of the population.

There were 347 households, out of which 40.3% had children under the age of 18 living with them, 61.4% were married couples living together, 12.1% had a female householder with no husband present, and 21.0% were non-families. 15.3% of all households were made up of individuals, and 6.6% had someone living alone who was 65 years of age or older. The average household size was 3.21 and the average family size was 3.57.

In the CDP the population was spread out, with 27.0% under the age of 18, 6.9% from 18 to 24, 29.3% from 25 to 44, 25.2% from 45 to 64, and 11.6% who were 65 years of age or older. The median age was 37 years. For every 100 females, there were 100.9 males. For every 100 females age 18 and over, there were 100.0 males.

The median income for a household in the CDP was $62,813, and the median income for a family was $65,781. Males had a median income of $43,125 versus $32,875 for females. The per capita income for the CDP was $24,564. About 0.7% of families and 1.9% of the population were below the poverty line, including 1.7% of those under age 18 and 1.6% of those age 65 or over.
