= National Reform Party (Hawaii) =

- Founded: January 3, 1890
- Headquarters: Honolulu, Hawaii
- Ideology: Constitutional monarchism Kalākaua royalism Hawaiian Nationalism; Conservatism

The National Reform Party was a political party in the Kingdom of Hawaii that formed in the late 19th century, late in the history of the Kingdom and shortly before the United States annexation of Hawaii. In January, 1890, the National Reform Party was established in opposition to the Reform Party, drawing from the group Hui Kālaiʻāina and the Mechanics' and Workingmens' Political Protective Union. It was regarded as a moderate political party and supported Queen Liliʻuokalani and native Hawaiians; in turn, she formed her cabinet entirely from members of the National Reform Party. The other two main parties were both critical of the queen; the conservative Reform Party said she was too liberal and the Liberal Party accused her of being too conservative.

Successful candidates included John Adams Cummins and Paul Neumann.

== See also ==
- National Liberal Party (Hawaii)
