= National Liberal Party (Hawaii) =

Hawaiian National Liberal Party
- Chairperson: Joseph K. Nawahi; John Edward Bush
- Founded: 1892
- Headquarters: Honolulu, Hawaii
- Ideology: Hawaiian nationalism National liberalism Civic nationalism Progressivism

In 1892, the Hawaiian National Liberal Party (Hawaiian: ʻAoʻao Lāhui Hawaiʻi Lipelala), also known as the National Liberal Party of the Hawaiian Kingdom (generally known as just the "Liberal Party"), was a political party of the Kingdom of Hawaii near its end.

== Ideology ==
=== Liberal nationalism ===
The party's liberal nationalist program was similar to that of the European National Liberal parties during the 1800s. In its platform, the Hawaiian Liberal Party stated that, "We deem that all Government should be founded on the principles of Liberty, Equality, and Fraternity; we hold that all men are born free and equal before the law and are endowed with inalienable rights to life, to liberty, to property, to the pursuit of happiness..." They also expressed revisions to international treaties and aiding Native Hawaiians in acquiring farmland and homesteads.

=== Progressivism ===
The Liberal Party were economically progressive, continuing from their platform "…and to self-protection against arbitrary concentration of power, irresponsible wealth, and unfair competition." Liberals preferred progressive taxation by raising taxes for organizations and the rich, while giving tax exemptions and aid to the poor. Other goals were to provide the public with economic protection and reduce the power of "monopolies, trusts and privileges of special classes".

== History ==
It was established in January 1892 as a radical offshoot of the moderate National Reform Party. Its first president was John Edward Bush and its vice president was Joseph K. Nawahi. After an October special election in 1892, the party ousted Bush and elected Nawahi president and John K. Prendergast his vice president. Nawahi was considered more level-headed than Bush and Nawahi prompted Liberals to work with the National Reformers to break the impasse in the three-way split of the legislature.

=== The Liberal ===
The Liberal Party had their own newsletter named The Liberal.

=== International Rifle Association ===
The Liberal Party also had their own gun club, the International Rifle Association, similar to a political militia.

== See also ==
- National Reform Party (Hawaii)

== Sources ==
Kuykendall, Ralph S. (1967). The Hawaiian Kingdom.: Volume 3--The Kalakaua Dynasty, 1874-1893. University of Hawaii Press.
