= Oʻahu Cemetery =

Cemetery in Honolulu, Hawaii

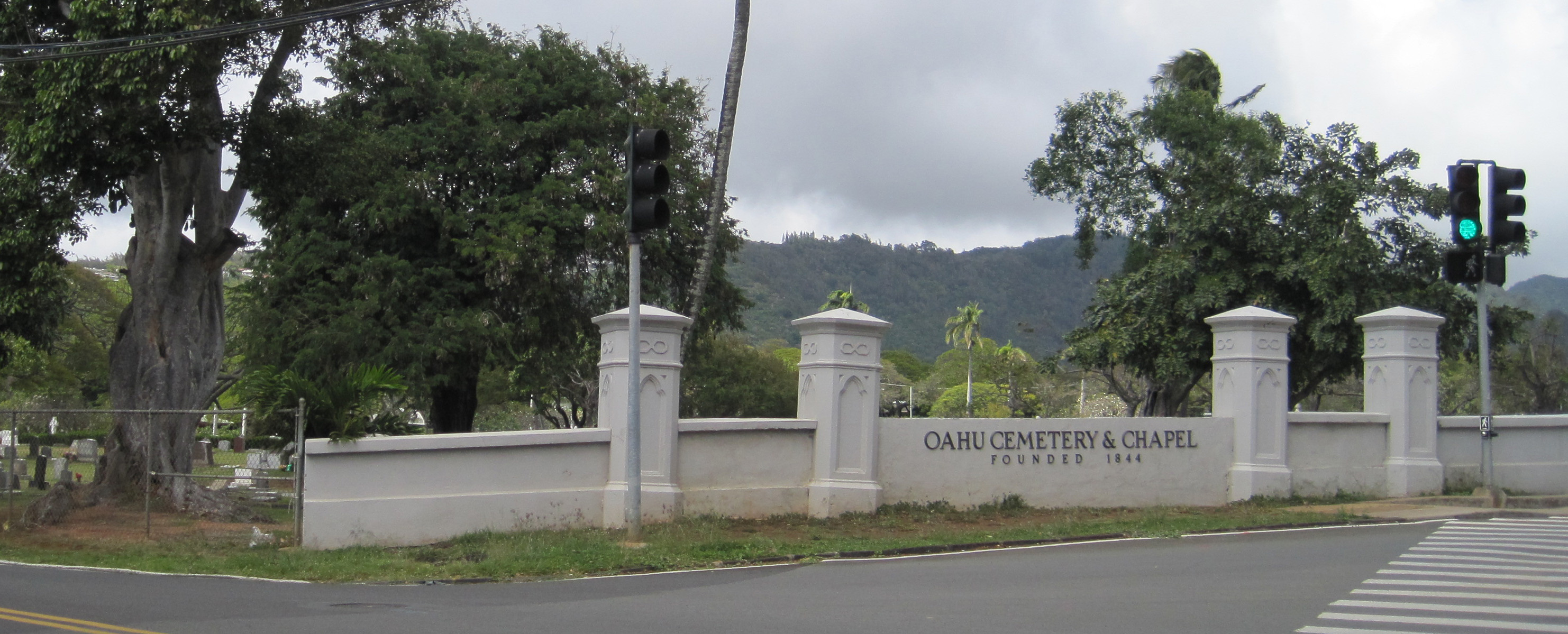
- Oʻahu Cemetery & Chapel boundary wall at Nuʻuanu Ave. & Judd St.
- Interactive map of Oʻahu Cemetery

Details
- Established: November 1844
- Location: 2162 Nuʻuanu Avenue
- Country: United States
- Size: 4.38 acres (1.77 ha)

The Oʻahu Cemetery is the resting place of many notable early residents of the Honolulu area. They range from missionaries and politicians to sports pioneers and philosophers. Over time it was expanded to become an area known as the Nuʻuanu Cemetery.

== History ==
It was the first public cemetery in Honolulu, founded in November 1844. Due to the growth in the whaling industry, discussion had started in 1836 on the need for a new burial ground that was not associated with a specific church. The 4.38 acres (1.77 ha) site was purchased for $300 and $350 granted for a house. The money was raised by selling subscriptions on 59 plots of $12 each. Later another 3 acres (12,000 m^{2}) were purchased from Gerrit P. Judd to expand in 1860. Rev. Samuel C. Damon served on the cemetery association in the early days. The first recorded burial was American sailor H. Wolley, for $2.50.

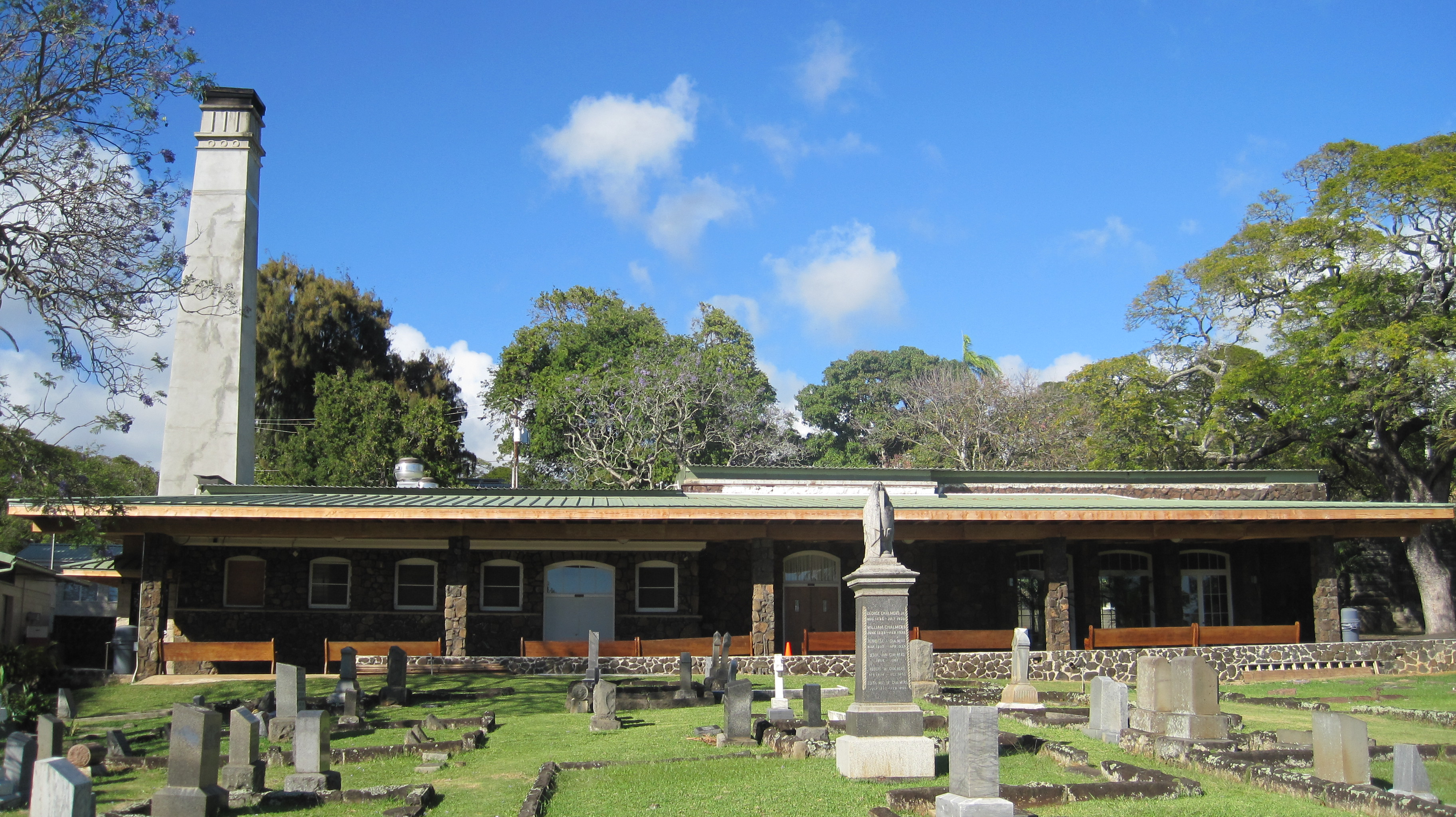
Crematorium built in 1906

In 1906, the first public crematory in the Hawaiian Islands, designed by architect Oliver G. Traphagen opened at the cemetery.

After the attack on Pearl Harbor in 1941, all paper currency on the islands was withdrawn and replaced with Hawaii overprint notes, in case the Japanese invaded. Faced with the task of quickly destroying $200 million of cash, the crematory at the cemetery was used to burn it, instead of risking transport to the mainland. However, progress was too slow, so the larger furnace at the Aiea sugar mill was also used.^{[a]}

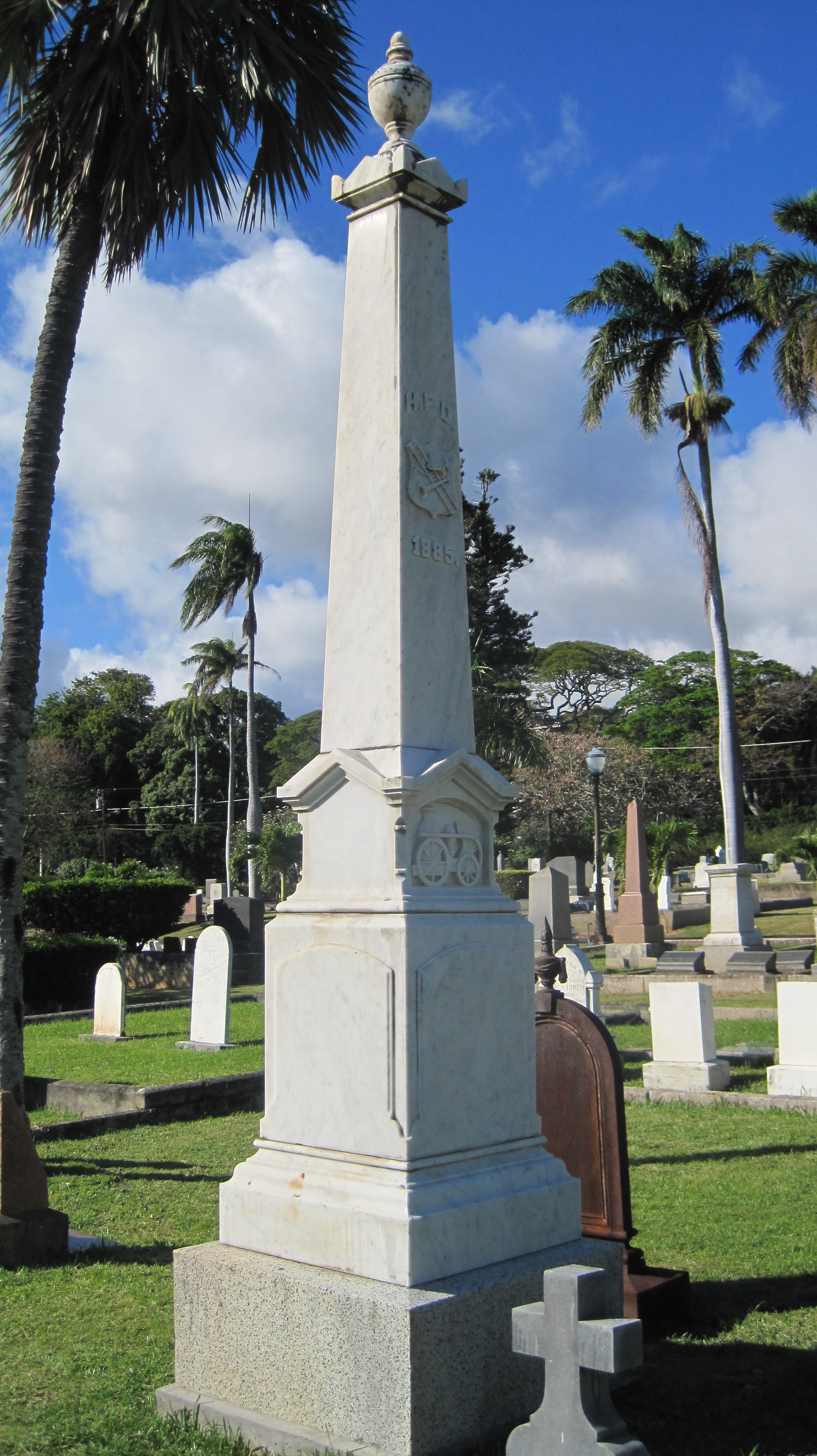
Honolulu Fire Department memorial, 1885

An area called the Seamen's Lot contains many unmarked graves for sailors, provided by the Honolulu Sailor's Home. Another plot is dedicated to firefighters, marked by a monument 15 feet (4.6 m) high. Two dozen were killed by strafing in the December 7, 1941, attack.

Oʻahu Cemetery is located at 2162 Nuʻuanu Avenue, at the base of the Nuʻuanu Valley at coordinates 21°19′27″N 157°51′1″W. In 1863, King Kamehameha IV built the Royal Mausoleum of Hawaii across the street for the Hawaiian royal family. In Punchbowl Crater (to the south) the National Memorial Cemetery of the Pacific was founded in 1948. Just north of the Royal Mausoleum, the "Nuʻuanu Memorial Park" was added in 1949, with its own funeral home. In 1958, a Japanese cemetery was added on adjacent land called "Honolulu Memorial Park". In 1964, two Columbaria (buildings to store cremated remains) called the Kyoto Gardens were constructed.

One of the buildings is a replica of a Buddhist temple. They are listed on the National Register of Historic Places.

Strictly speaking, the original 1844 cemetery is called "Oʻahu Cemetery", although the extended area is often called "Nuʻuanu Cemetery" after the area.

In 1989, a funeral for Ferdinand Marcos was planned at the mortuary, but instead the body was kept refrigerated at the Byodo-In Temple until it was flown back to the Philippines in 1993.

== Notable burials ==
- Captain Alexander Adams (1780–1871), Scottish sea captain
- R. Alexander Anderson (1894–1995), composer
- Lorrin Andrews (1795–1868), missionary, publisher, judge
- Andrew Auld (1799–1873), Scottish shipbuilder
- Joseph Campbell (1904–1987), philosopher
- George R. Carter (1866–1933), Territorial Governor
- Alexander Cartwright (1820–1892), baseball pioneer
- Mary Catton (1882–1971) social worker
- John F. Colburn (1859–1920), businessman and politician
- William H. Cornwell (1843–1903), politician
- Samuel C. Damon (1815–1885), missionary
- Benjamin Dillingham (1844–1918), industrialist
- Emma Smith Dillingham (1844–1920), civic leader, educator, and poet
- Mary Jones Dominis (1803–1889) mother of Prince Consort John Owen Dominis
- Wilhelmine Kekelaokalaninui Widemann Dowsett (1861–1929), founder of the National Women's Equal Suffrage Association of Hawai'i, the first Hawaiian suffrage organization
- Kenneth Emory (1897–1992), anthropologist
- Jean Erdman (1916–2020), dancer and choreographer
- Elizabeth P. Farrington (1898–1984), legislator
- Joseph Rider Farrington (1897–1954), publisher
- Wallace Rider Farrington (1871–1933), 6th Territorial Governor (1920–28)
- Mary Jane Kekulani Fayerweather (1842–1930), teacher, musician, dairy farmer
- Grace Crosby Hamman (1899–1983), director of services to the blind in Hawaii, 1935–1955
- Victor S. K. Houston (1876–1959), naval officer, congressional delegate
- John Papa ʻĪʻī (1800–1870), educator, jurist
- Cornelia Hall Jones (1842–1911), philanthropist and clubwoman
- Stella Maude Jones (1889–1955) librarian, archivist, historian
- Bernice Judd (1903–1971), librarian, historian, writer
- Gerrit P. Judd (1803–1873), missionary physician, diplomat
- Lawrence M. Judd (1887–1968), Territorial Governor
- Elizabeth Kahanu Kalanianaʻole (1879–1932), Hawaiian princess by marriage
- Stanley Kennedy Sr. (1890–1968), Founder of Hawaiian Airlines
- Oren E. Long (1889–1965), Governor, Senator
- J. R. Kealoha (d. 1877), a Native Hawaiian veteran of the Civil War
- Lincoln Loy McCandless (1859–1940), industrialist, congressional delegate
- Bina Mossman (1893–1990), entertainer, musical protegee of Queen Liliʻuokalani, political office holder
- Paul Neumann (c. 1839–1901), royal lawyer and attorney general
- Arthur P. Peterson (1858–1895), lawyer and politician
- Joseph Rock (1884–1962), explorer
- Martha Root (1872–1939), Bahá'í teacher
- Ingram Stainback (1883–1961), Territorial Governor
- Lorrin A. Thurston (1858–1931), businessman, politician
- Jules Tavernier (1844–1889), painter
- Horace Worth Vaughan (1867–1922), Texas politician, Hawai'i judge
- Four British Royal Navy personnel of World War II

== Notes ==
- a. Some sources do not use the word "Oʻahu" for the crematory, but use "Nuʻuanu", and this was the only crematory listed in telephone books at the time that was on Nuʻuanu Avenue.
