= Cubitt (disambiguation) =

Cubitt is a surname. It may also refer to:

- HMS Cubitt, a frigate of the British Royal Navy that served during World War II
- Cubitt (car), a British motor vehicle manufacturer from 1919 to 1925
- Cubitt Artists, an artist-run art gallery, artist studios and art educator, founded in 1991
- Cubitt Town, an area on the Isle of Dogs in Tower Hamlets in London, England

== See also ==
- Cubit (disambiguation)
