= Edith Andrews =

Edith Andrews may refer to:

- Edith Alice Andrews (1873–1958), British artist
- Edith Lovell Andrews (1886–1980), British artist
