= Ellinor Davenport Adams =

British journalist and author

- Born: 1858; Putney Heath, London, England
- Died: 11 April 1913 (aged 54–55); Putney, London, England
- Other name: Ellinor Lily Davenport Adams
- Occupations: Author and Journalist
- Years active: 1878–1903
- Known for: Girls' fiction

Ellinor Davenport Adams (birth registered in the fourth quarter of 1858 – 11 April 1913) was a British journalist and writer. She wrote mainly girls’ fiction, and told her stories from the child's perspective.

== Biography ==
Ellinor Davenport Adams (Note: Her name is sometimes spelled as Eleanor or Elinor Lily Davenport Adams) had her birth registered in the fourth quarter of 1858. She was the third surviving child, and second surviving daughter (Note: In addition to the four children who survived to adulthood, Adam's parents had two other children who dies in infancy.) of William Henry Davenport Adams (5 May 1828 – 30 December 1891), a journalist and author, and Sarah Esther Morgan (Note: Sarah Esther was later known as Lily Davenport Adams) (13 August 1835–1908), the daughter of shoemaker Timothy Morgan. The couple had married at St. Mary's Church in the Parish of Paddington, London on 26 December 1850.

The family as a whole were quite involved in literature and drama. Her father had over 100 books to his credit, and her eldest brother, William Davenport Adams (28 December 1851 – 26 July 1904) was a noted journalist and author. Her elder sister, Florence Mary Susan Ballingall (4th quarter 1855 – 4th quarter 1943) was also a journalist and writer, who wrote children's one-act plays, mainly about fairies. (Note: Florence married Charles Campbell Ballingall (1849–27 October 1896), then the chief clerk of the Lancashire Insurance Company at Birmingham, in Edinburgh on 31 March 1877, and the 1911 census shows that she bore no children. The marriage seems to have been a failure, as Florence lived apart from her husband. Her parents had already moved to Birmingham by the 1881 census, where Ballingall had been working in 1877, he had already moved to Inverness to be the resident secretary there for the company by 1879, he was promoted to assistant secretary in Edinburgh in 1890, and to resident secretary there in 1894.) Her brother Alfred Elliot (later Davenport) Adams (1st quarter 1861 – 1947) became an actor,, and married an actress.

It is not clear what education Adams received. The census returns show no governess living in the household. Her father was himself a schoolteacher and a family tutor and may have instructed his daughters (Note: His eldest son was sent to at Merchant Taylors' School in London, and later to The Glasgow Academy) while working as an editor and generating his prolific literary output. Her father had a large library of standard works and Adams was reading these at the age when most children are reading story books. The plot of her first book concerns a nine-year-old girl who is sent to a day-school run by a retired colonel and his sister, Colonel Russell's Baby 1889. The heroine was called Lily with a father who edited a provincial newspaper, like Ellinor herself, and who does not have the time to educate her.

Adams lived with her sister Florence her whole life. Although Florence had married in 1877, the 1881 census, only four years later, showed her living with Adams, her parents, and her younger brother at Victoria Road, Solihull, Birmingham. The 1891 census found Adams and Florence living with their parents at 46 Alexandra Road in Wimbledon, London, (Note: While the 1881 census showed Florence as married, and uses her married name, the 1891 census showed her as single and uses her maiden name, and the 1901 census as widowed and uses her married name.) the address at which her father died on 30 December 1891.

Both Adams and Florence gave their profession or occupation as "Literary" in the 1891 census. By 1901 Adams was living with her widowed mother and Florence, also a widow, (Note: Adams's father had died in December 1891 and her brother-in-law in 1896.) at 67 Chelverton Road in Putney, London, where she gave her profession or occupation as "Author". Adams was still living at 67 Chelverton road with Florence at the time of the 1911 census, both now giving their profession or occupation as "Journalism and Literature".

Adams's seems to have published no new books after 1902. This may have been because she took her brother's literary reviewing work at the Globe after his death in 1904, and her work for Blackie and Son, which continued up to her death. Her mother died in 1908, leaving Adams and her sister alone in the house with one servant. Adams's health gradually declined and she died at home on 11 April 1913. Her death certificate records that she had suffered from chronic bronchial asthma for many years, and that after suffering for 14 days from pleurisy, she lost consciousness and died. She was buried in Putney Vale Cemetery on 16 April 1913.

== Work ==
Adams's first published work in a book appears to be her story Wild Raspberries: a tale of love and adventure which was one of five stories in St. Quentin's, a village tale published by the Edinburgh Publishing Company, Edinburgh, 1828, and other stories, by Gertrude Douglas and others. Adams was 27 at the time. Her first long story of girls, Colonel Russell's Baby was published in 1889, but her obituary notes that she wrote the story in her girlhood.

She had long worked with her brother William Davenport Adams, who was on the editorial staff at "The Globe" in his work as a literature reviewer, and took over from him after his death, holding the post for several years.

Ellinor wrote girls' stories mostly. Most of her later stories were published by Blackie and Son for whom she acted as a publisher's reader. (Note: Her father had also been a reader and author for Blackie.) Several of her later books were graduated readers for use in schools.

=== Books ===
The following list of works has been drawn mainly from a search on the Jisc Library Hub Discover website, (Note: The Jisc Library Hub Discover brings together the catalogues of 168 major UK and Irish libraries. Additional libraries are being added all the time, and the catalogue collates national, university, and research libraries.) supplemented by searches for confirmation of details or for any missing details at the British Library, WorldCat, and in the British Newspaper Archive. Adams also wrote serial stories, not all of which seem to have been published in book form. In particular The Wonder Workers the story of a household of girls who go to London to make their fortunes began as a serial in The Girl's Own Paper in May 1903..

Ser	Year	Title	Illustrator	Publisher	p.	Notes
1	1878	Wild Raspberries: a tale of love and adventure (a story in St. Quentin's, a village tale, and other stories, by Gertrude Douglas and others)		Edinburgh Publishing Company, Edinburgh	184 p., 8º	(Note: One of five stories in the volume. The five authors were Gertrude Douglas, Charles Holcroft, Mrs. Hibbert Ware, Adams, and Evelyn Everett-Green. The Glasgow Herald said that the stories were "of a healthy tone and . . . the plots are unravelled with a fair amount of skill". The Examiner considered that the shortcomings of the first four stories was atoned for by the pathos of the story by Everett-Green.)
2	1886	The illustrated poetical birthday book, with a supplement of female Christian names and appropriate quotations		W. Mack, London	292 p. ; 16º	(Note: Available on-line via Google Books. The book consists of pages with three dates, each of which has at least one poetry extract, interspersed with pages with those dates with spaces for entering the names of the persons whose birthdays fall on those dates. The illustrations take the form of floral borders for a poem before the beginning of each month. The Appendix of female christian names has fifty names, each with one or two poetry extracts.)
3	1889	Colonel Russell's Baby		W. Smith & Innes, London	[4], 430p., 8º	(Note: Available on-line at the British Library. The "clever and unconventional book" met with somewhat mixed reviews, with the Morning Post considering that it was "unpleasant and full of false sentiment", while The Globe found it to be "a singular and original study" of the character of an individual child, and found that it never failed "to convey a sense of complete reality in matters of feeling" and the Illustrated London News said that Adams had "bestowed on this small single figure of girlhood emerging from infancy as much thoughtful study of the growth of feminine moral and intellectual capacities as some other better-known authoresses have spent in representing the early lives of numerous groups of sisters, cousins, or schoolfellows. . .")
4	1891	Comrades True	Edith Scannell	Oliphant, Anderson & Co, London	304 p., 6 ill., 8º	(Note: The plot centers around the friendship of a boy and a girl, who remain true friends in the face of adversity. The Aberdeen Free Press considered it an "excellent, wholesome, and well-written story." The Aberdeen Free Press said that the book would delight both boys and girls. The Graphic decided that while the tale was improbable, it was "nicely told all the same". The Gentlewoman thought the story was like a breath of an invigorating sea breeze. The Inverness Courier judged it to be "as pleasant book for children." The Globe called this "a considerable advance . . . in literary skill and effect" upon her previous book Colonel Russell's Baby.)
5	1891	Robin's ride	Walter S. Stacey (Note: In reference to Stacey's work, The Globe called the book "attractively illustrated".)	Cassell and Co., London	192, 16 p., 20 ill., 8º	(Note: Initially published as a serial in Myra's Journal of Dress and Fashion (Note: Myra's Journal of Dress and Fashion was a monthly journal which featured colour illustrations of fashion, as well as household tips and serialised short novels. It was started by the husband of the late Mrs Beeton and Matilda "Myra" Browne in 1875) starting in January 1891. The book tells the story of a little boy who make a dangerous ride through the snow to get something to please his playmates. The Globe calls it a "pleasant volume" and states that is shows a lot of knowledge of child life and character.)
6	1894	The disagreeable duke : a Christmas whimsicality for holiday boys and girls	Emily J. Harding (Note: The Birmingham Daily Post said that Harding's illustrations for The Disagreeable Duke reached "a very high level of merit", and the Manchester Courier called her illustrations "quaint and pretty".)	George Allen, London	8,114, 6 p., 8 pl., 8º	(Note: The plot centres around a band of children who plan to steal a fir tree from a disagreeable Duke and replace it with a note. The Birmingham Daily Post called it a "first rate little story of children's affairs". The Manchester Courier called it "a charming story", and "a capital Christmas story.")
7	1896	Little Miss Conceit	Hannah Clarke Preston MacGoun	Oliphant & Co, London	112 p., 8º	(Note: The plot centres around the fifteen-year-old daughter of a widow who has younger sisters and a younger brother, who earns the title "Little Miss Conceit" by being too proud for both domestic duties and for playing with her younger siblings. The Globe calls it "an excellent study of child-character")
8	1896	The Palace on the Moor		Edward Arnold, London	192, 32 p., 4 ill., 8º	(Note: In the Children's Hour Series, the attached catalogue was illustrated, but it is not clear if the book was. The story centres on a young boy who is sent home from India to join his elder sisters in England. He is not robust and lively, but proves his worth. The Manchester Courier called it an "interesting story". The Liverpool Mercury called it "a capital children's story". The Globe said that the story was "full interest for boys end girls" and was "told with sympathy and humour".In the Children's Hour Series, the attached catalogue was illustrated, but it is not clear if the book was.)
9	1896	The holiday prize, a modern fairy tale	Kenneth Mathiason Skeaping	Jarrold & Sons, London	205, 18 p., ill., 8º	(Note: The book is available online from the University of Florida Digital Collections. There are no fairies as such in the book. When all the children "of fair degree" (Note: The Children "of fair degree" are the children of middle-class parents, including the Squire's children the Rector's children, the doctor's children, and the children of retired colonels, a naval captain, a lawyer, and others.) in the village gather for the summer holidays at the Squire's his maiden sister offers a prize to the boy who becomes the most perfect embodiment of a knight. The Gentlewoman called the book "bright and imaginative", and formed the initial volume of Jarrold's new Snug Corner Series. The Dundee Advertiser found that the fairies met with in the book were very real, and that the book taught "a gentle yet effective lesson" on courtesy.)
10	1897	May, Guy and Jim; with other stories, etc.	John Henry Frederick Bacon	Blackie & Son, London	192 p., 8º	(Note: A collection of short stories, which The Globe called "agreeably fresh in subject and in treatment" St. James's Gazette said that the book was unsuitable for younger boys and girls, but only for those who were almost grown up because the "character-drawing is above the heads of children" but apart from this the stories were charming.)
11	1897	Miss Secretary Ethel, a story for girls of to-day	Harry Furniss (Note: The Dundee Advertiser states that Miss Secretary Ethel in enhanced by Furniss's "beautiful illustrations".)	Hurst and Blackett Ltd., London	255 p., ill., 8º	(Note: The plot centres around the story of an older girl who, because of the illness and poverty of her foster parents, becomes secretary to a rural Baronet with Parliamentary ambitions. She is so efficient that her boss fires her because of his growing dependence on her. However, she soon returns to her employer in another capacity.)
12	1899	A Girl of To-day, etc.	Gertrude Demain Hammond	Blackie & Son, London	288 p., 6 ill., 8º	(Note: The boys and girls of Woodend band together to form a Society of Altruists to help their poorer neighbours.)
13	1899	Miss Mary's Little Maid	Margaret E. Thompson (Note: Margaret E. Thompson, born in Calcutta in 1873, was a figure and flower painter as well as an illustrator. Her initial forte was murals and vases with motifs of fairies and elegant ladies She was one of Doulton's leading designers by 1912.)	Blackie & Son, London	112 p., 13 ill., 8º	(Note: This was one of Blackie and Son's one-shilling graduated readers. Each had a colour frontispiece and black and white illustrations. The one-shilling series were intended for children with a reading age above seven.)
14	1899	A queen among girls	Harold Copping	Blackie, London	288p, 6 ill., 8º	(Note: Mitchell states that it is "a novel with even more than the usual quota of tears and self-sacrifice" The Liverpool Mercury said that this was "Perhaps the best story for girls we have seen this season.")
15	1900	Betty the bold	Edith Alice Cubbitt	Blackie & Son, London	112, 24 p., ill., 8º	
16	1900	Granny's coach-and-four	Percy Tarrant	Edward Arnold, London	105, 7 p., ill., 8º	(Note: A school book and part of Edward Arnold's continuous story readers (Grade 1) which sold for 10d. (Note: This was in pre-decimal pence in the UK, and was worth less than one shilling.) The story, in 21 chapters, told how a young boy and girls, made sacrifices and worked and planned to buy their grandmother a wheeled chair. The English historian and Alfred Leslie Rowse records in his autobiography A Cornish Childhood that he got it as a gift from his teacher on leaving his infant school. It was the first book he owned and he was very proud that he could read it himself when he got home. Arnold's continuous story readers Grade I)
17	1901	Little greycoat	Edith Alice Cubbitt, Talwin Morris, Chris Mullen	Blackie & Son, London	80 p., ill., 12º	(Note: Blackie's juvenile series. It showed how a young sweet child could exercise an influence for good.)
18	1901	On Honour. A school and home story		T. Nelson & Sons, London	332 p., 4 col. ill., 8º	(Note: The story tells how three girls and the cousin of one of them effect, by kindness, the improvement of the character of two sisters brought up by a mean and stingy old Aunt. The London Standard calls it "a pleasant story with plenty of fun and a good moral." Sims and Clare call her characterisation of the two sisters "moving and credible", and note that long after boys’ school stories had moved from questions of honour to concentrated on sport and feuds, girls' stories were still dealing with problems of honour.)
19	1902	Elsie Wins!	H. M. Brock and Audrey J. Watson. (Note: Brock was responsible for the colour frontis while Watson did the black and white illustrations.)	Blackie & Son, London	111, 8 p., col. fs, ill., 8º	(Note: A Blackie's Story Book Reader.)
20	1902	Those twins!	Susan Beatrice Pearse (Note: The Globe states that Those Twins is "lavishly and attractively illustrated" by Pearse.)	Blackie & Son, London	211, 32 p., 28 ill., 8º	(Note: The plot centres around the attempts of two twins, a boy and a girl, to reform their scapegrace uncle. The Globe states that the twins are very life-like and that the book again demonstrates how well Adams knowns and understands children.)

=== Example of illustrations for a book by Adams ===
Kenneth Mathiason Skeaping (13 December 1856 – 16 May 1946), a lithographer, portrait painter, and illustrator, (Note: Kenneth Skeaping was the father of musician and early music specialist Kenneth Mathiason Skeaping (22 September 1897 – 14 October 1977), sculptor and painter John Skeaping (9 June 1901 – 5 March 1980), and ballet dancer and producer Mary Emma Skeaping (15 December 1902–9 February 1984).) illustrated A Holiday Prize with 35 illustrations, shown below, plus a decorative title page, decorative heading bands for each chapter, and silhouettes for each end of chapter.The Gentlewoman said that The Holiday Prize, already a bright and imaginative tale, was "still further enhanced by the artistic illustrations" of Skeaping.

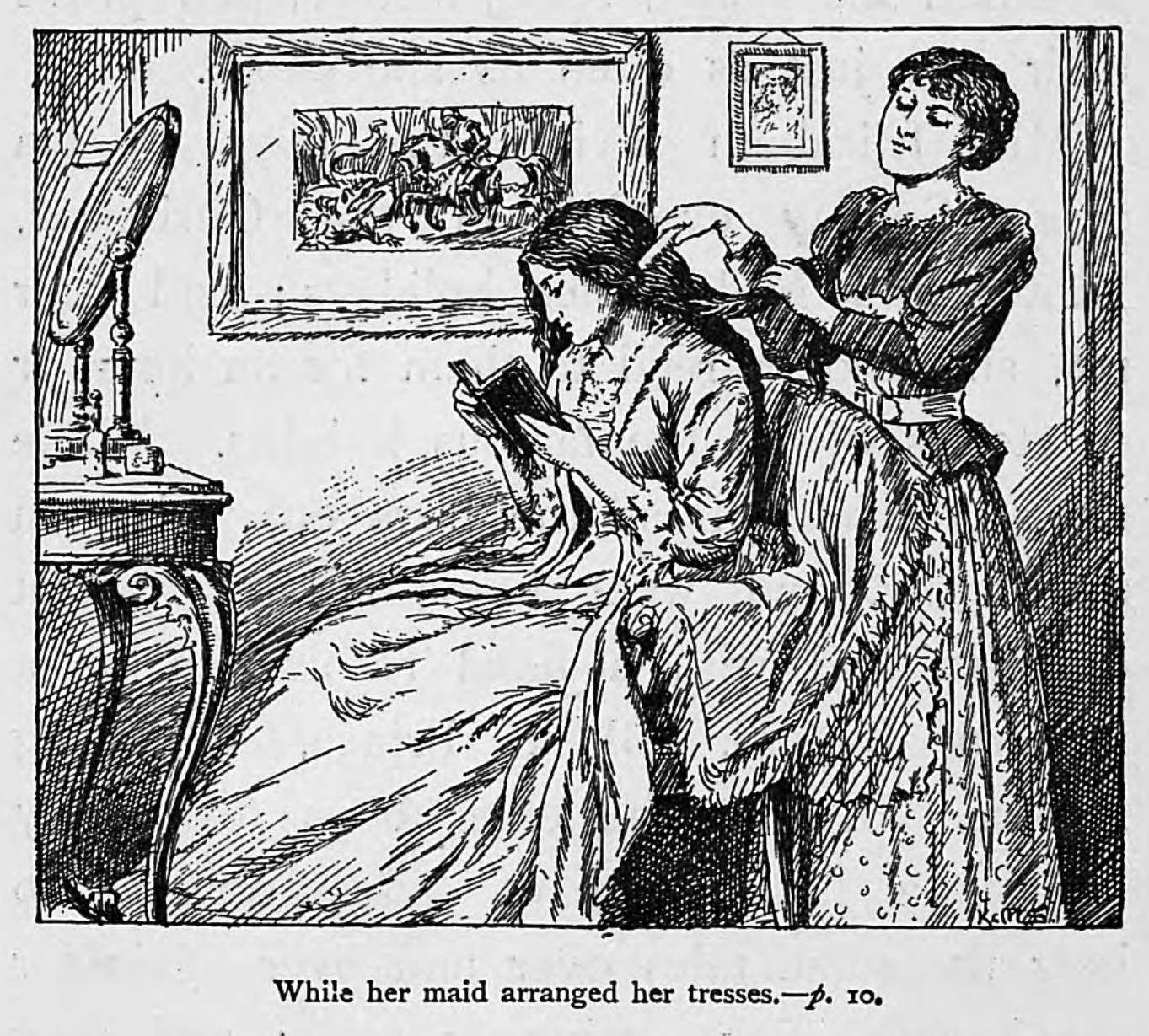
Page-010

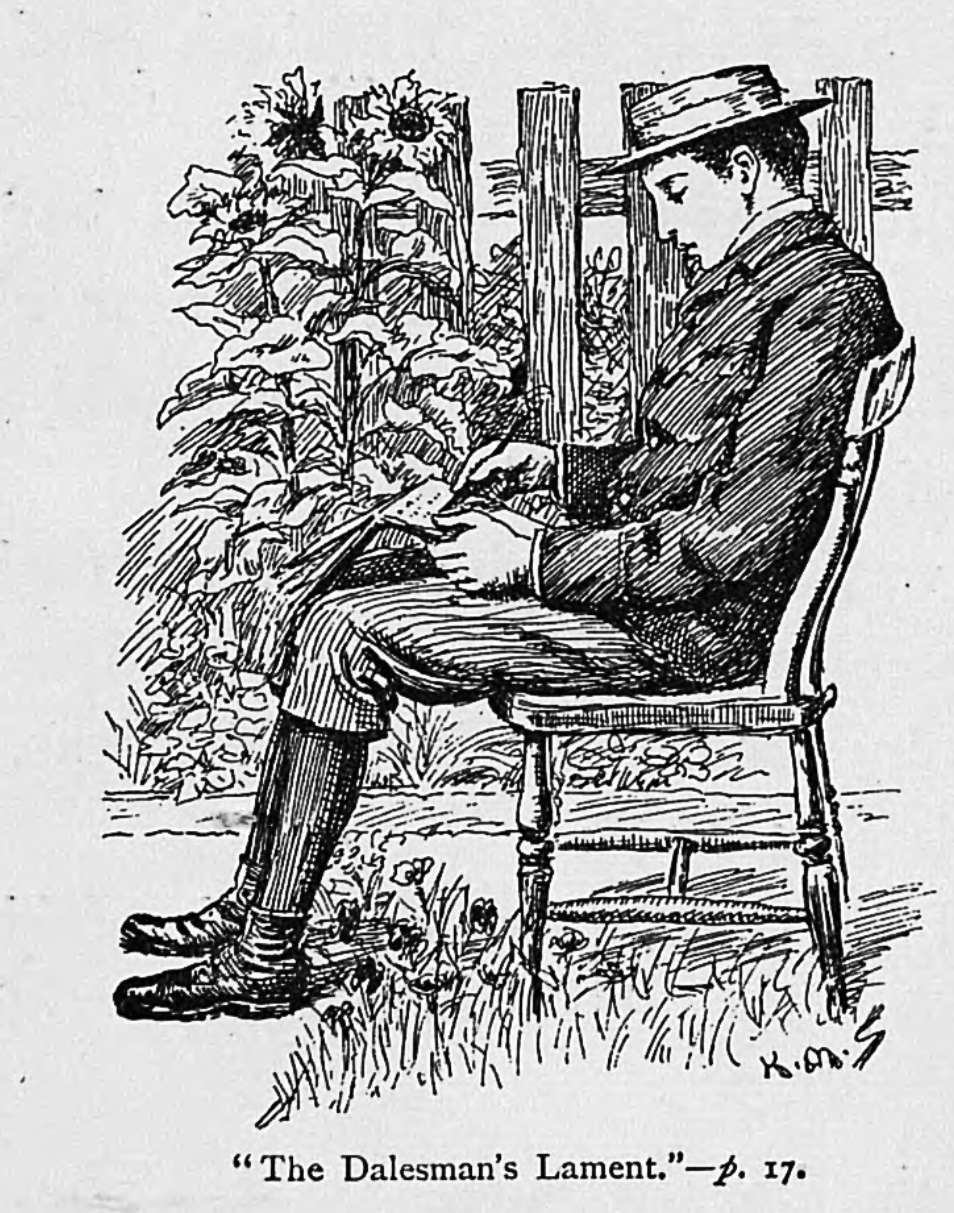
Page-017

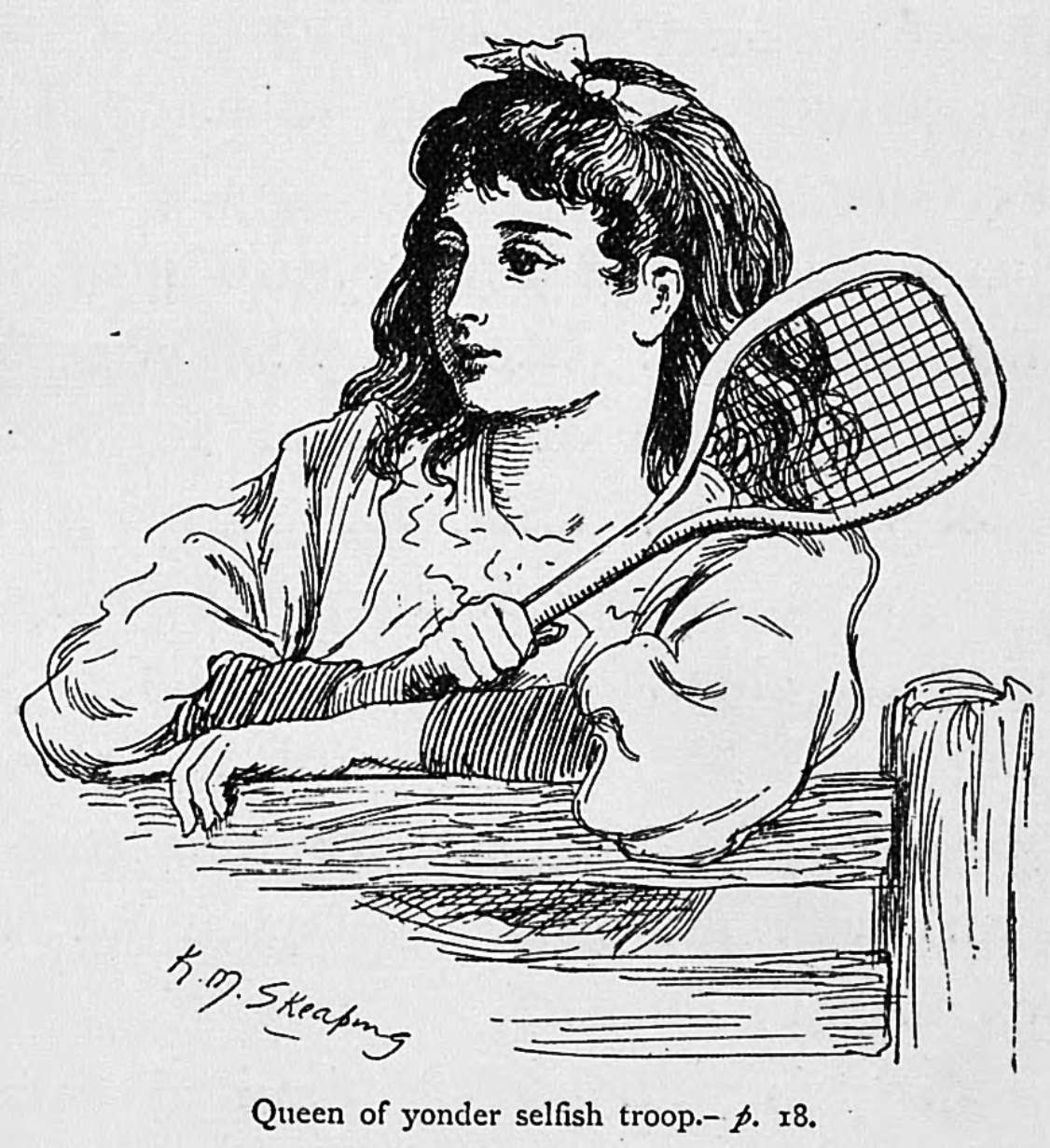
Page-018

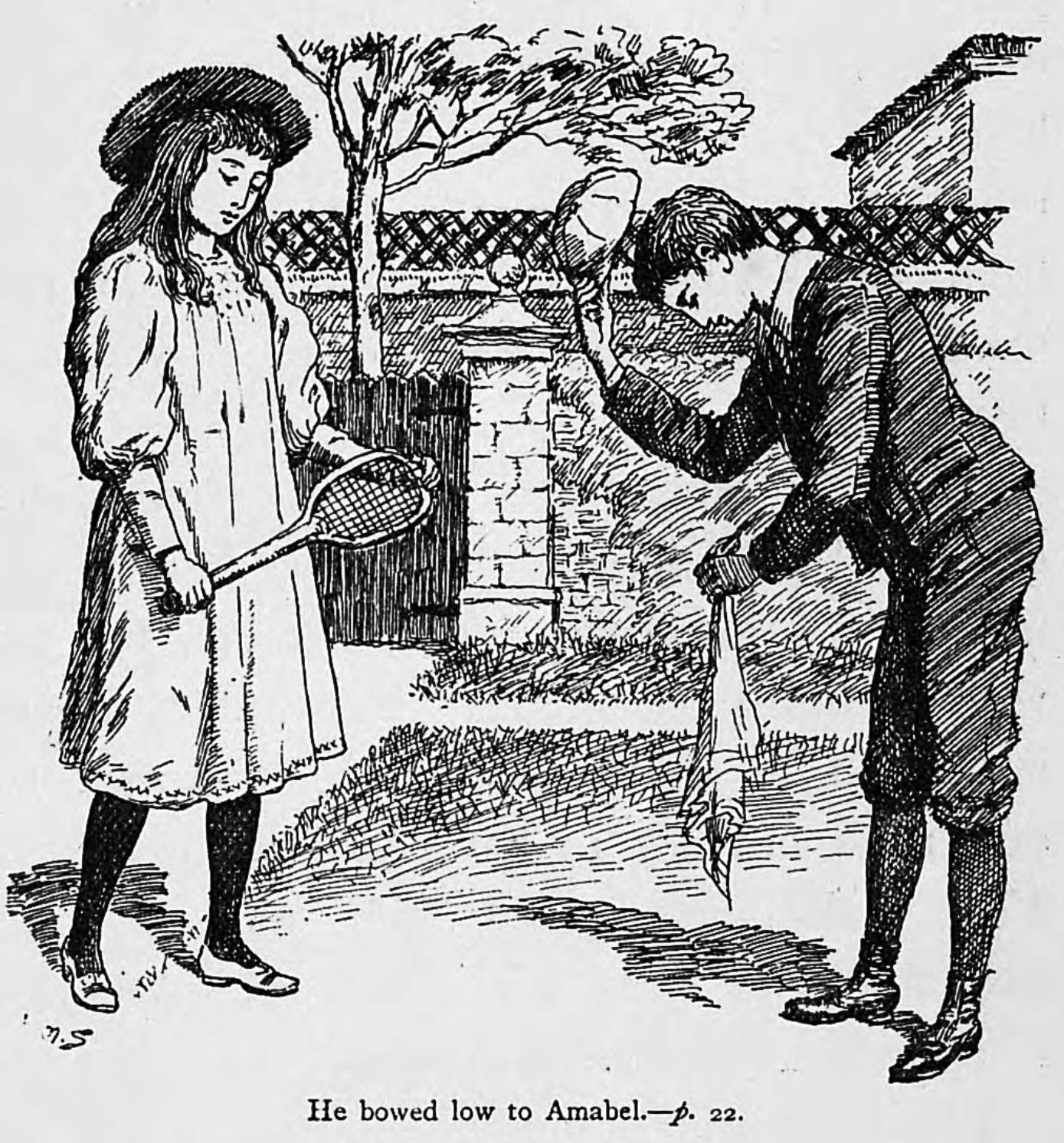
Page-022

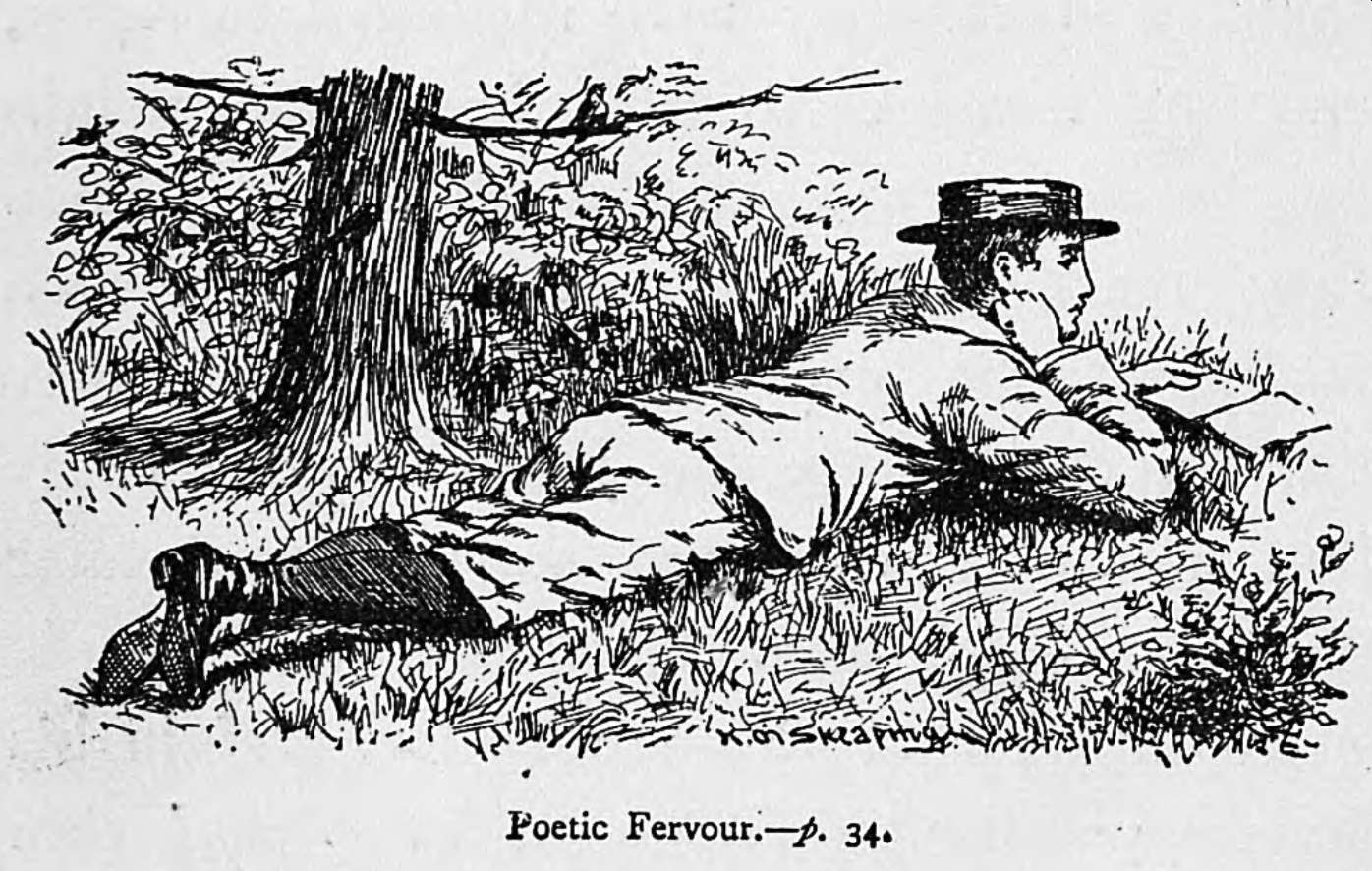
Page-034

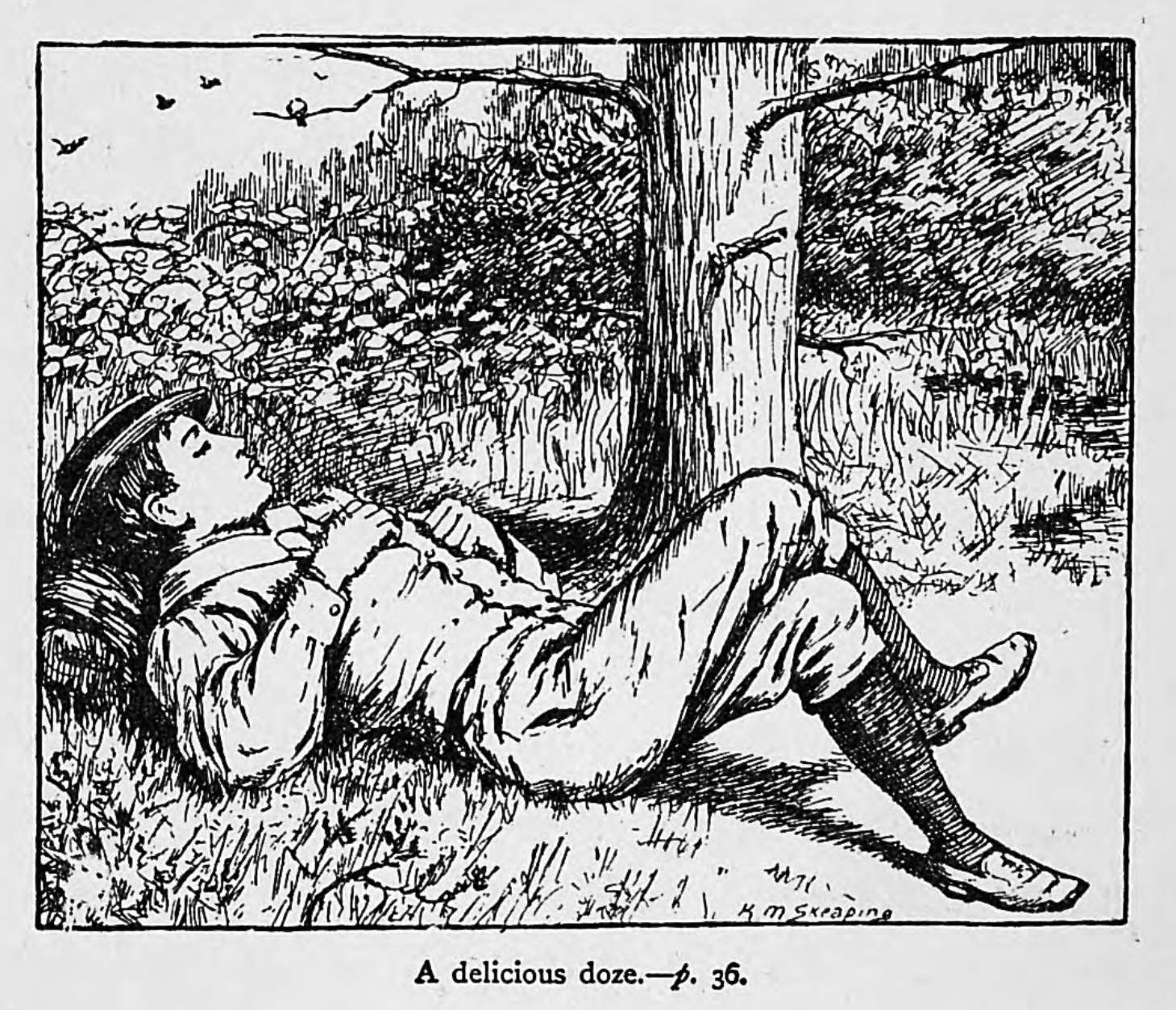
Page-036

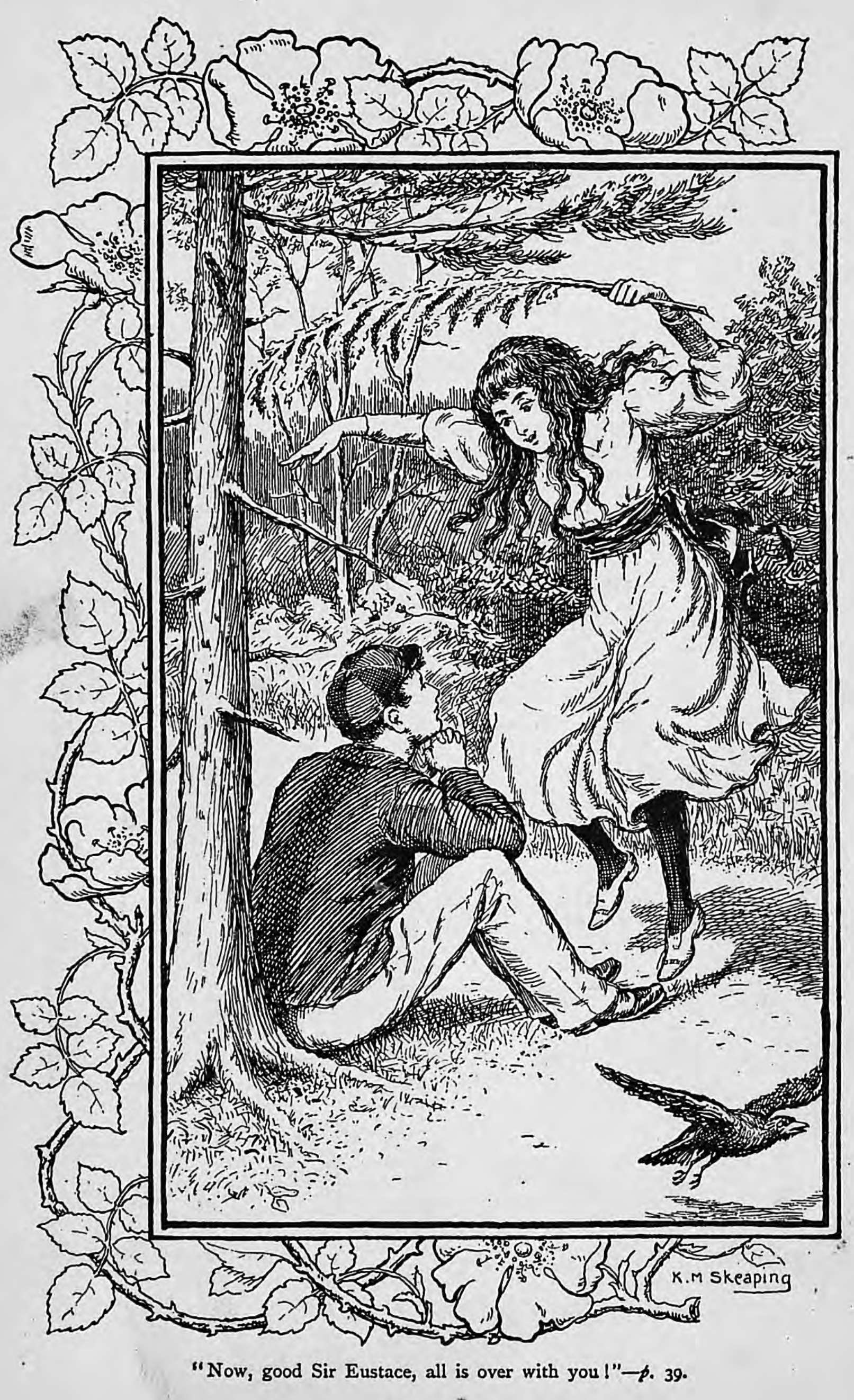
Page-039

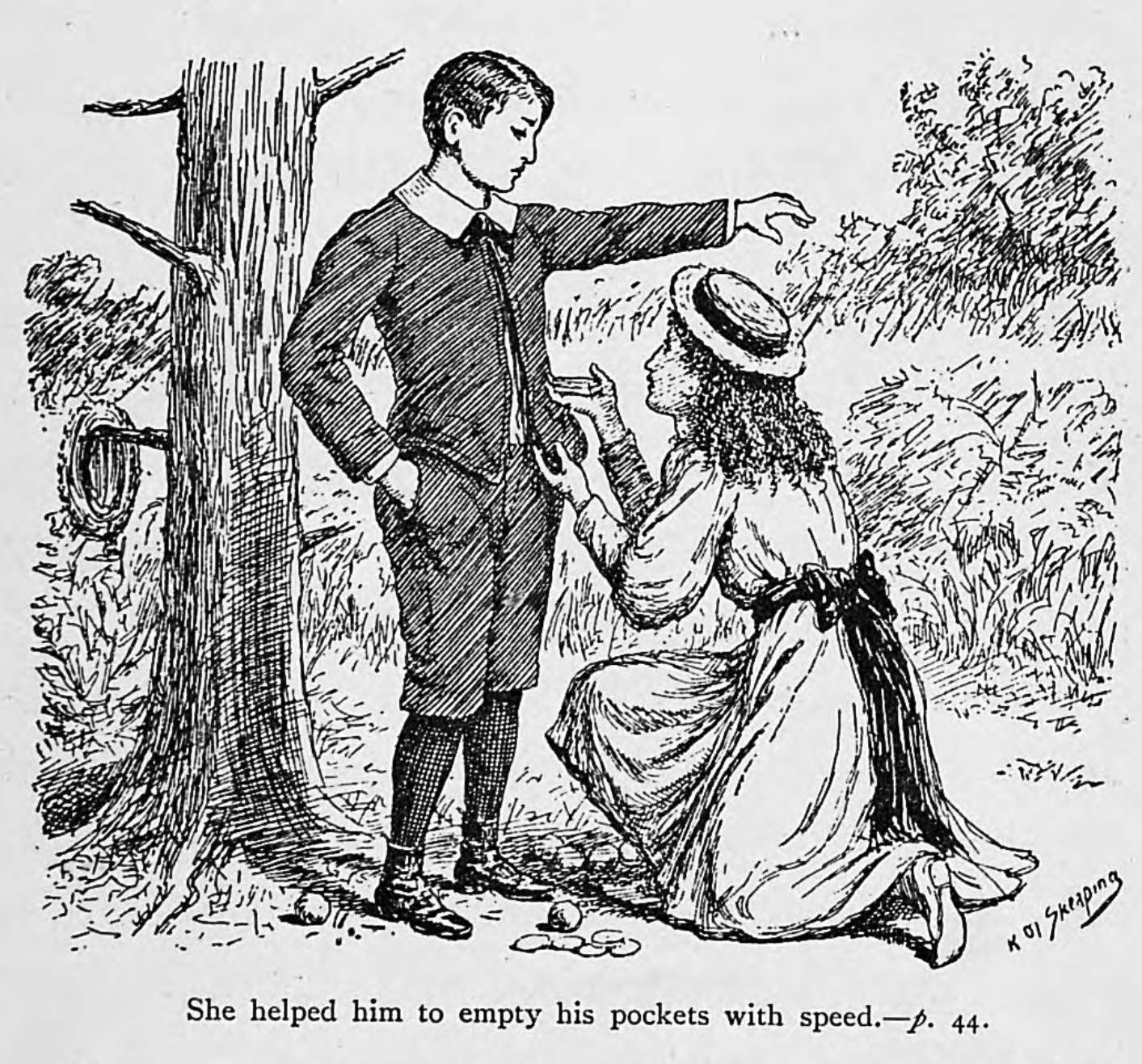
Page-044

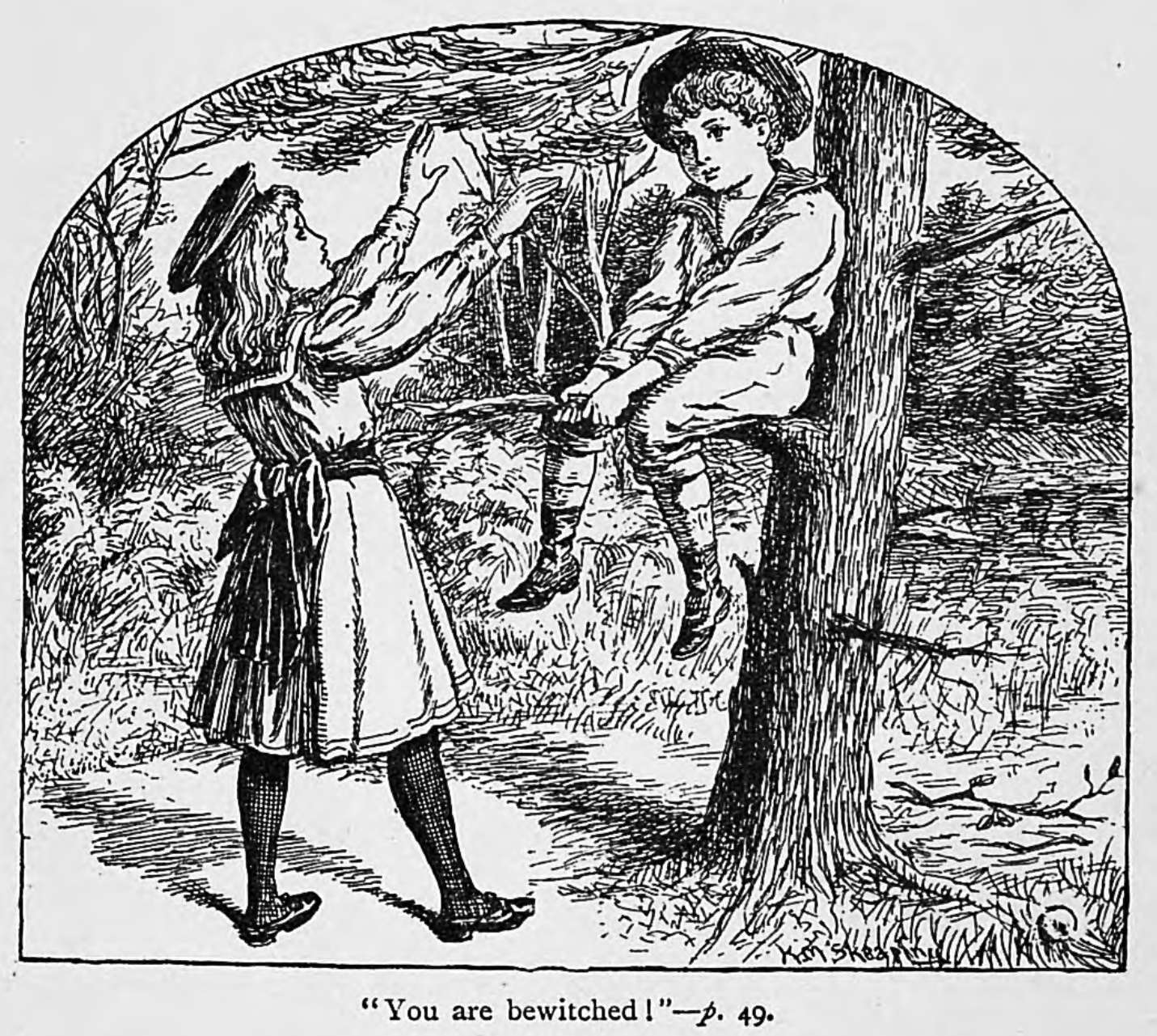
Page-049

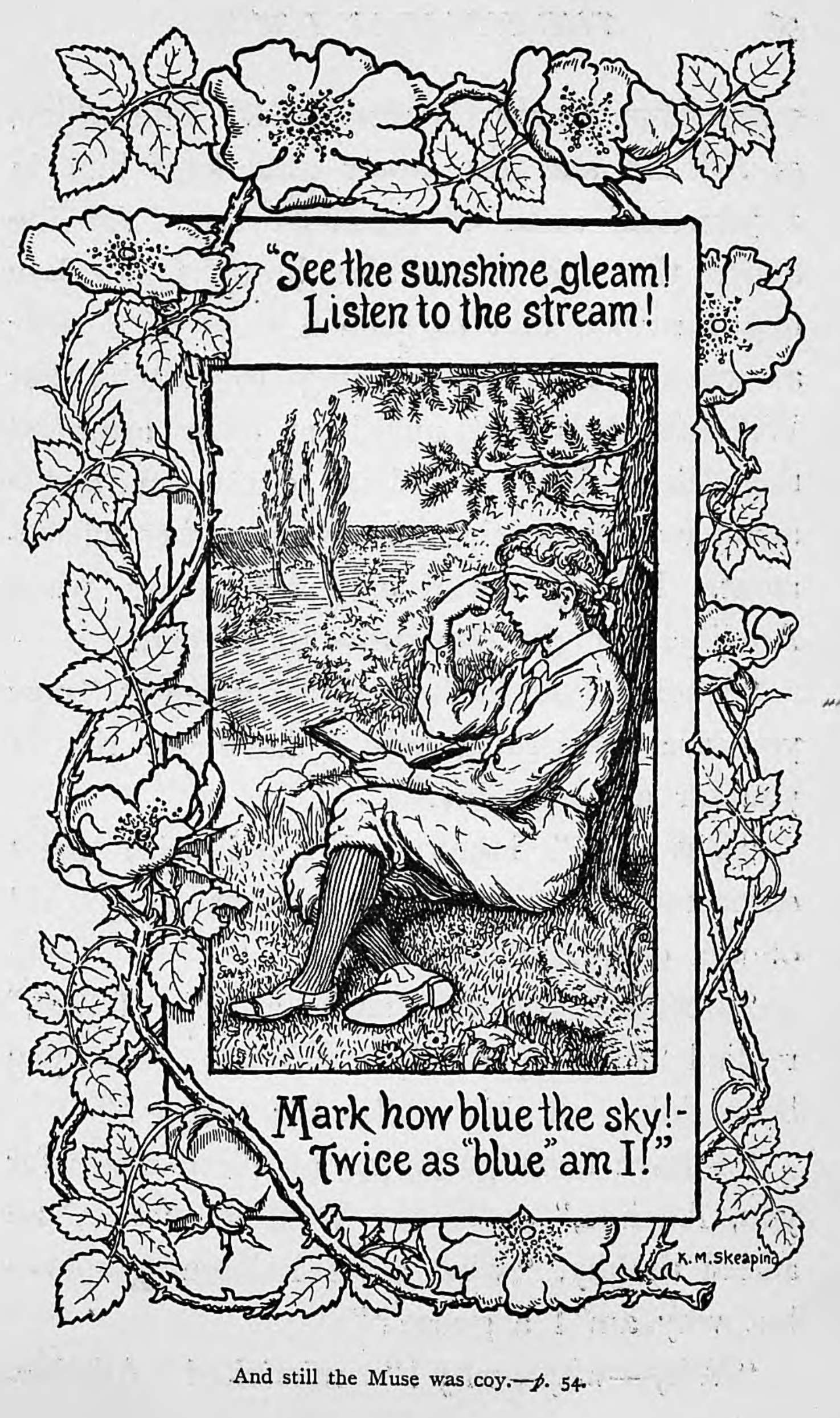
Page-054

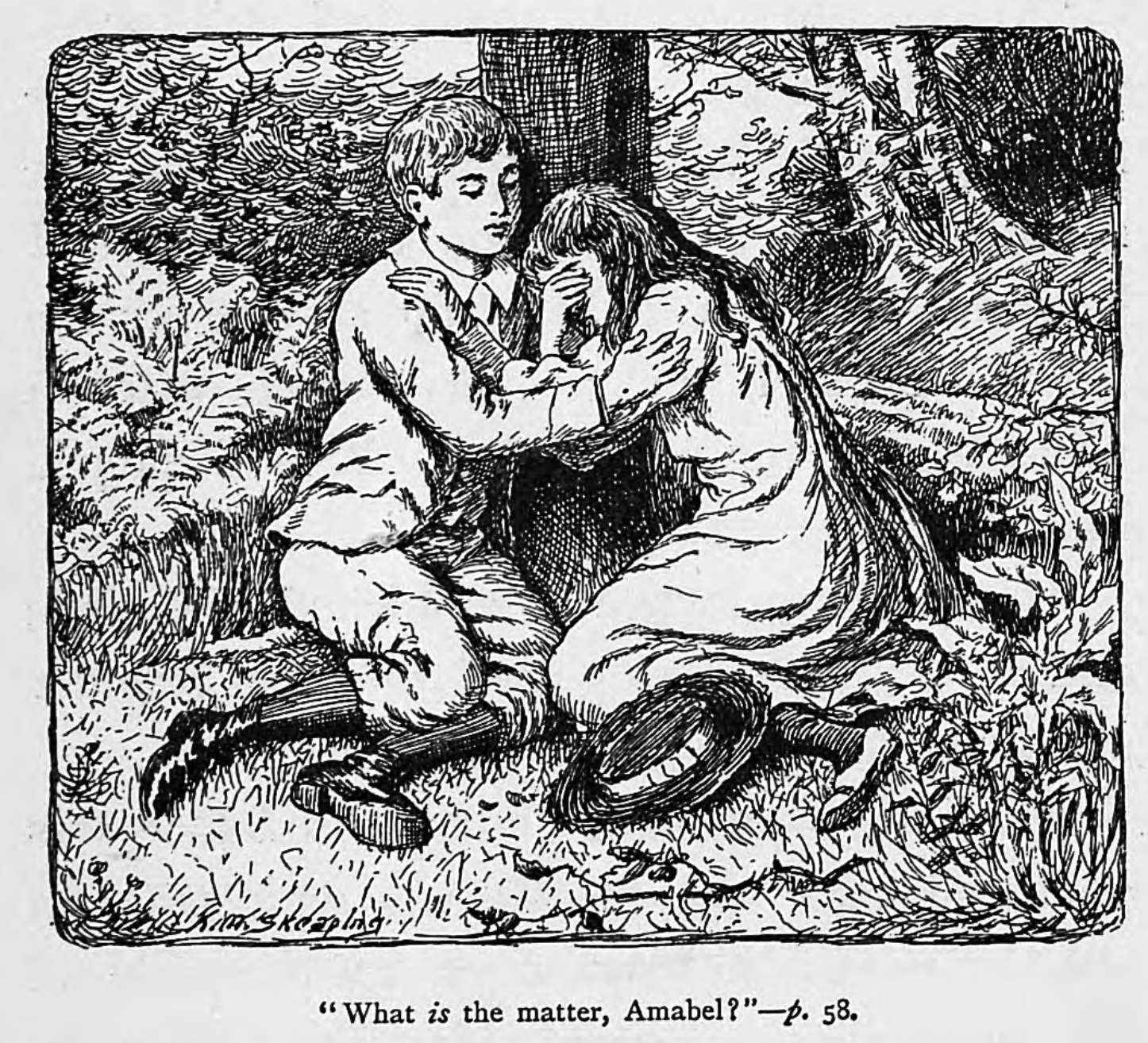
Page-058

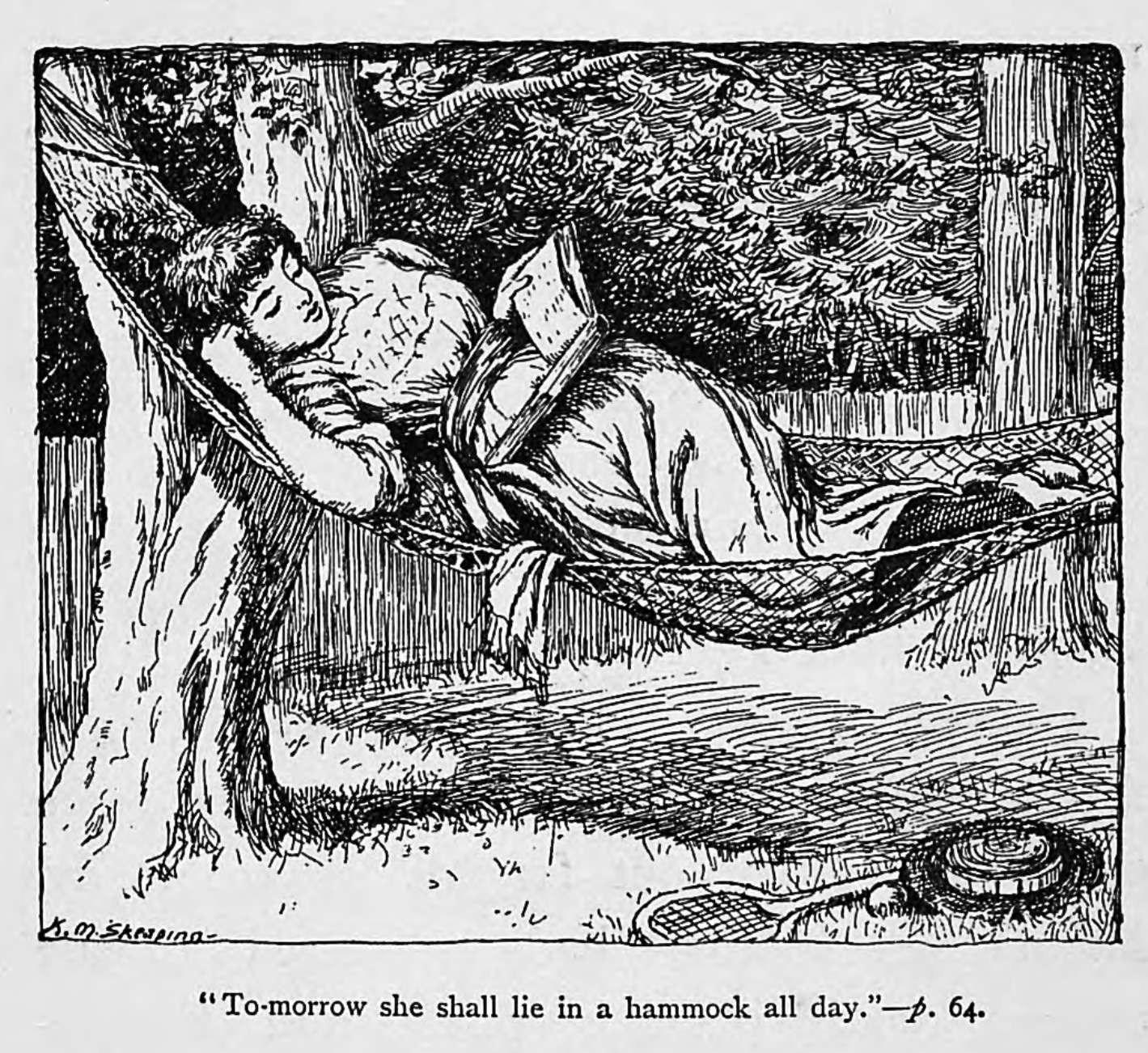
Page-064

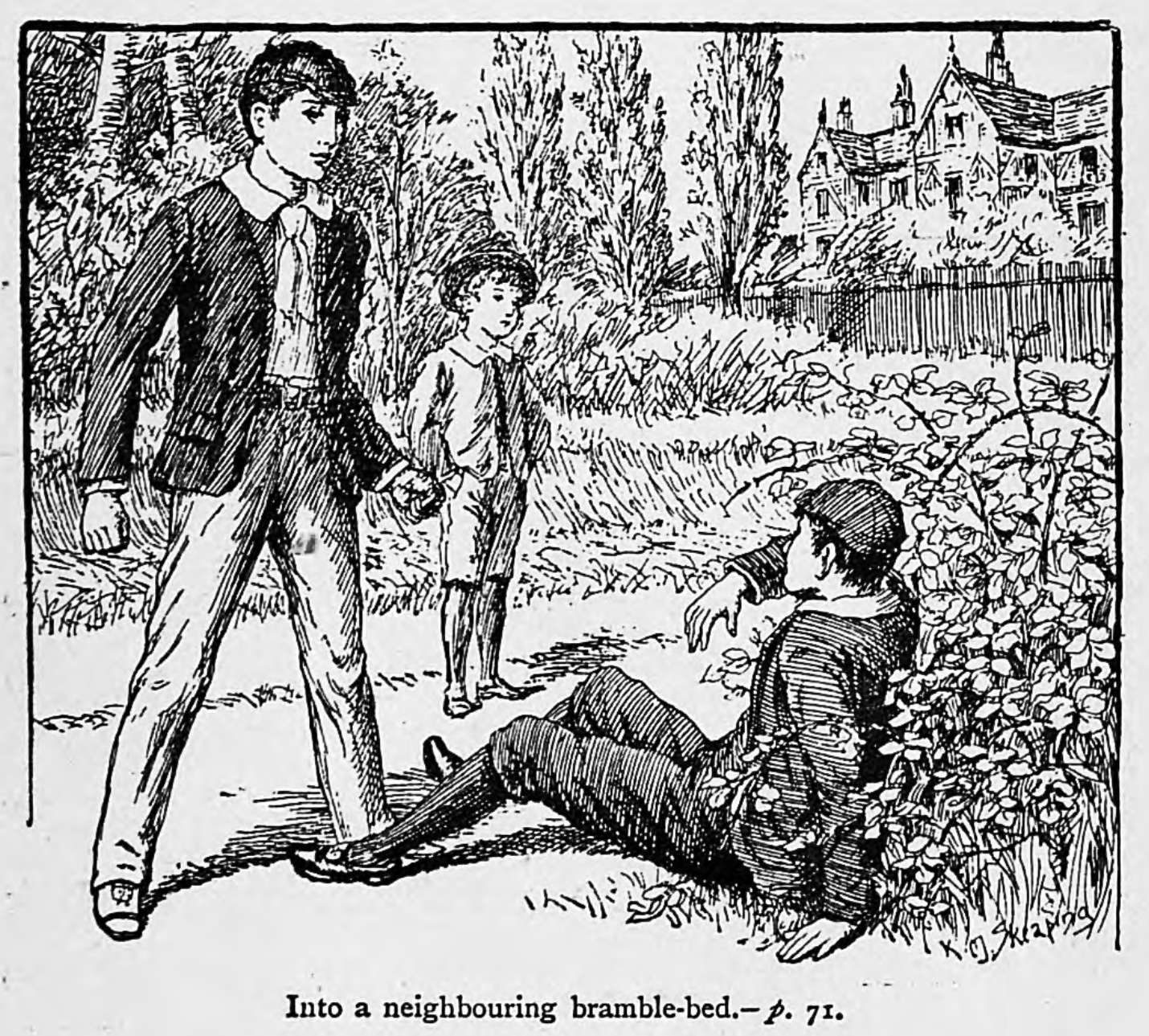
Page-071

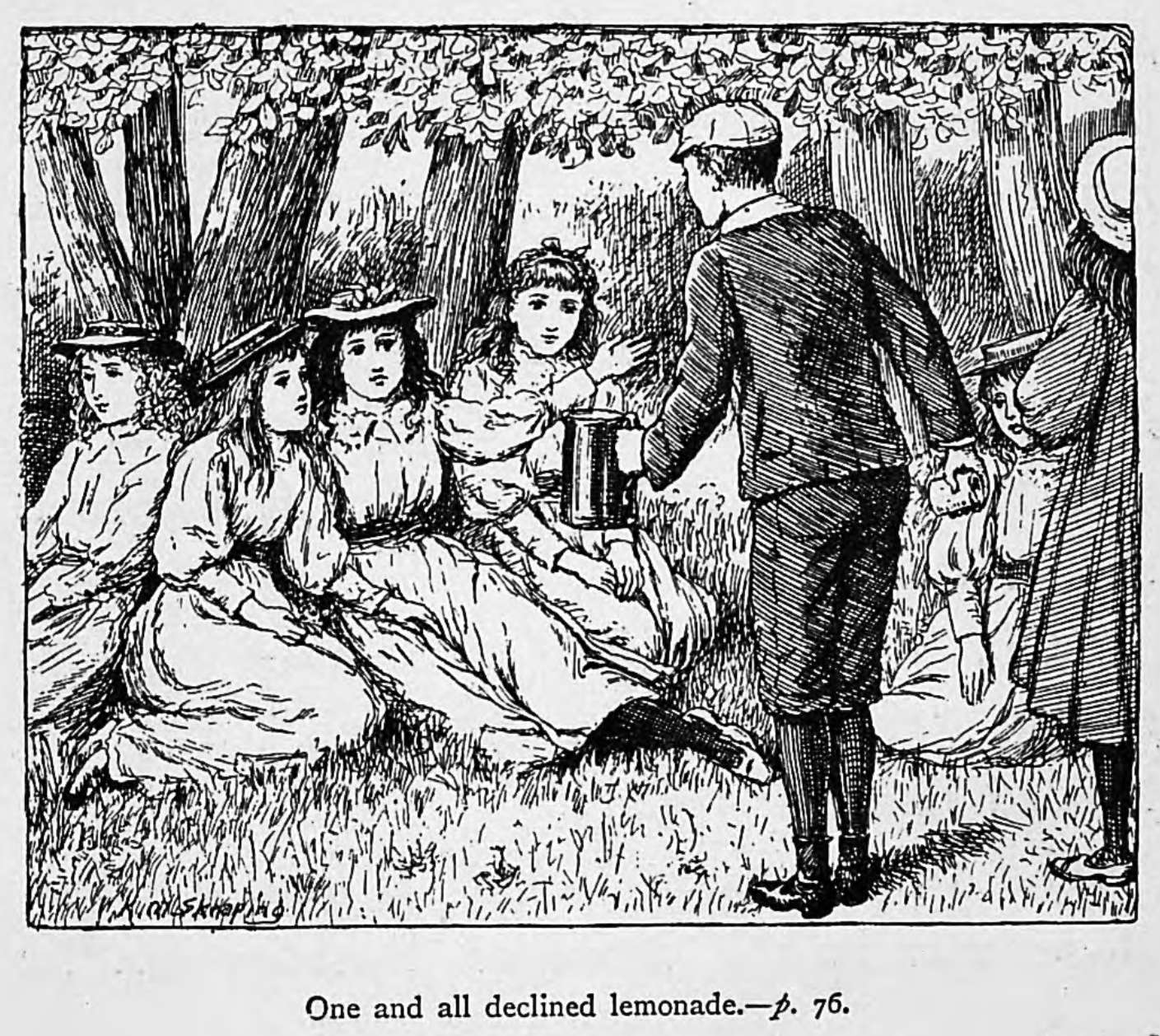
Page-076

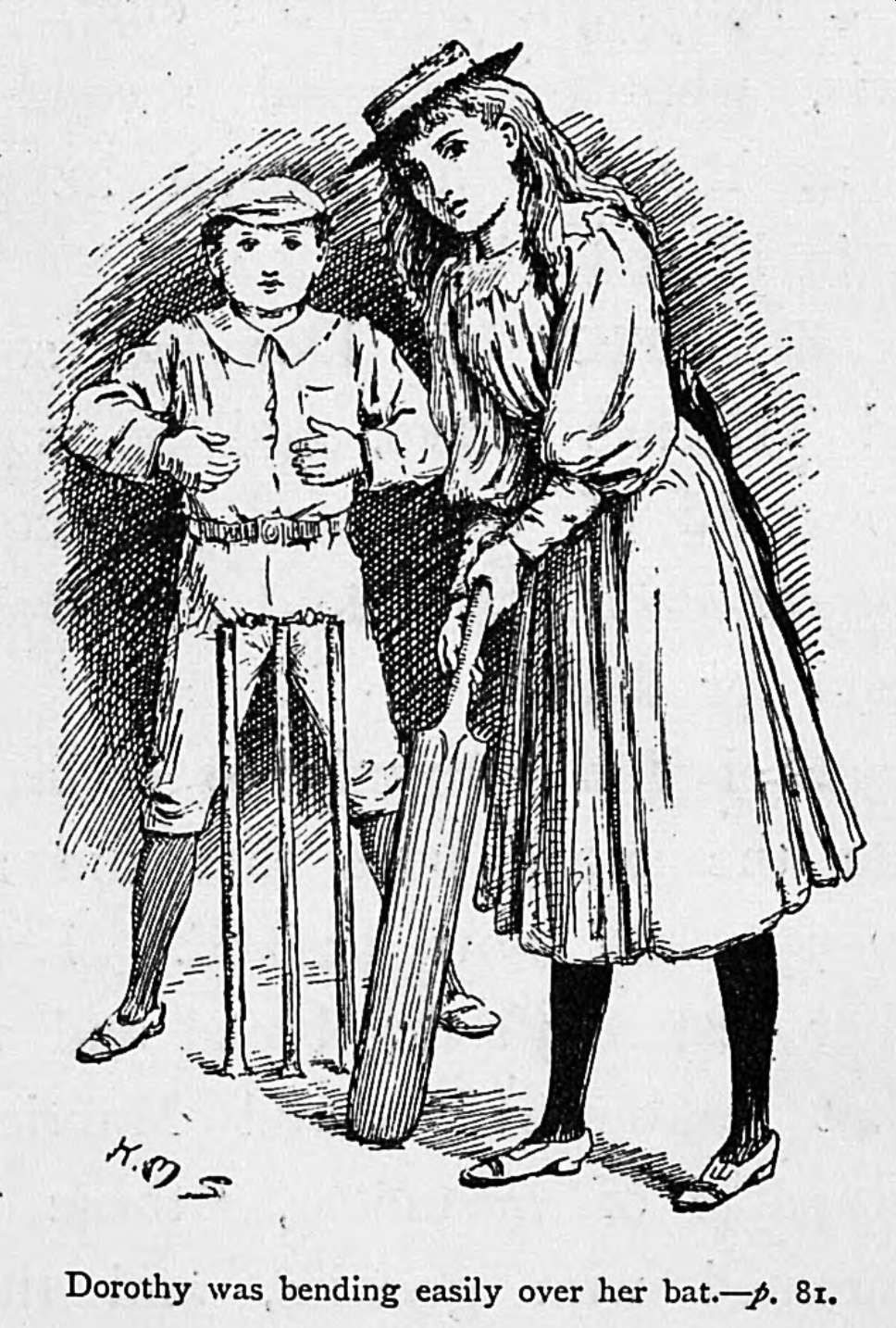
Page-081

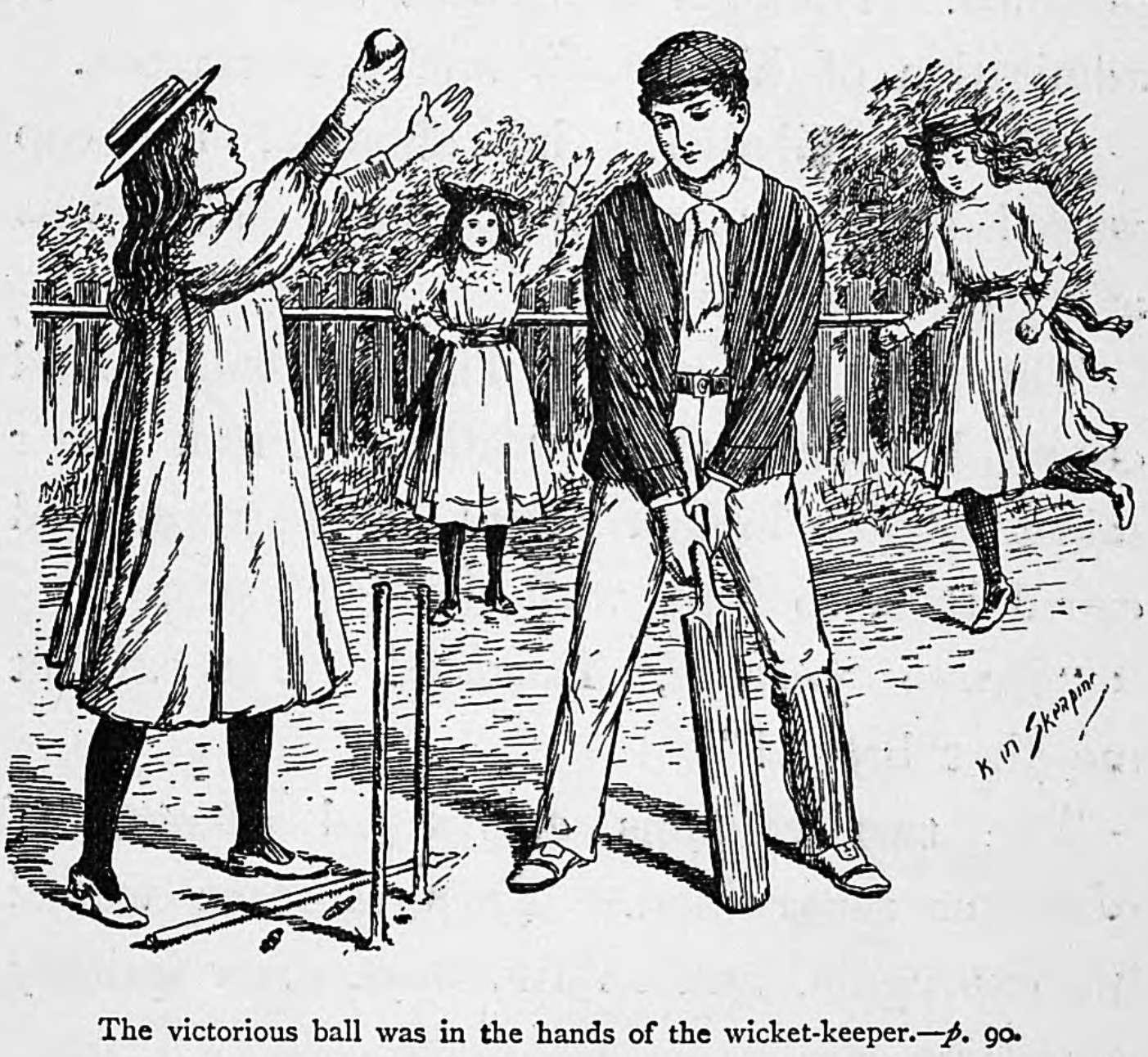
Page-090

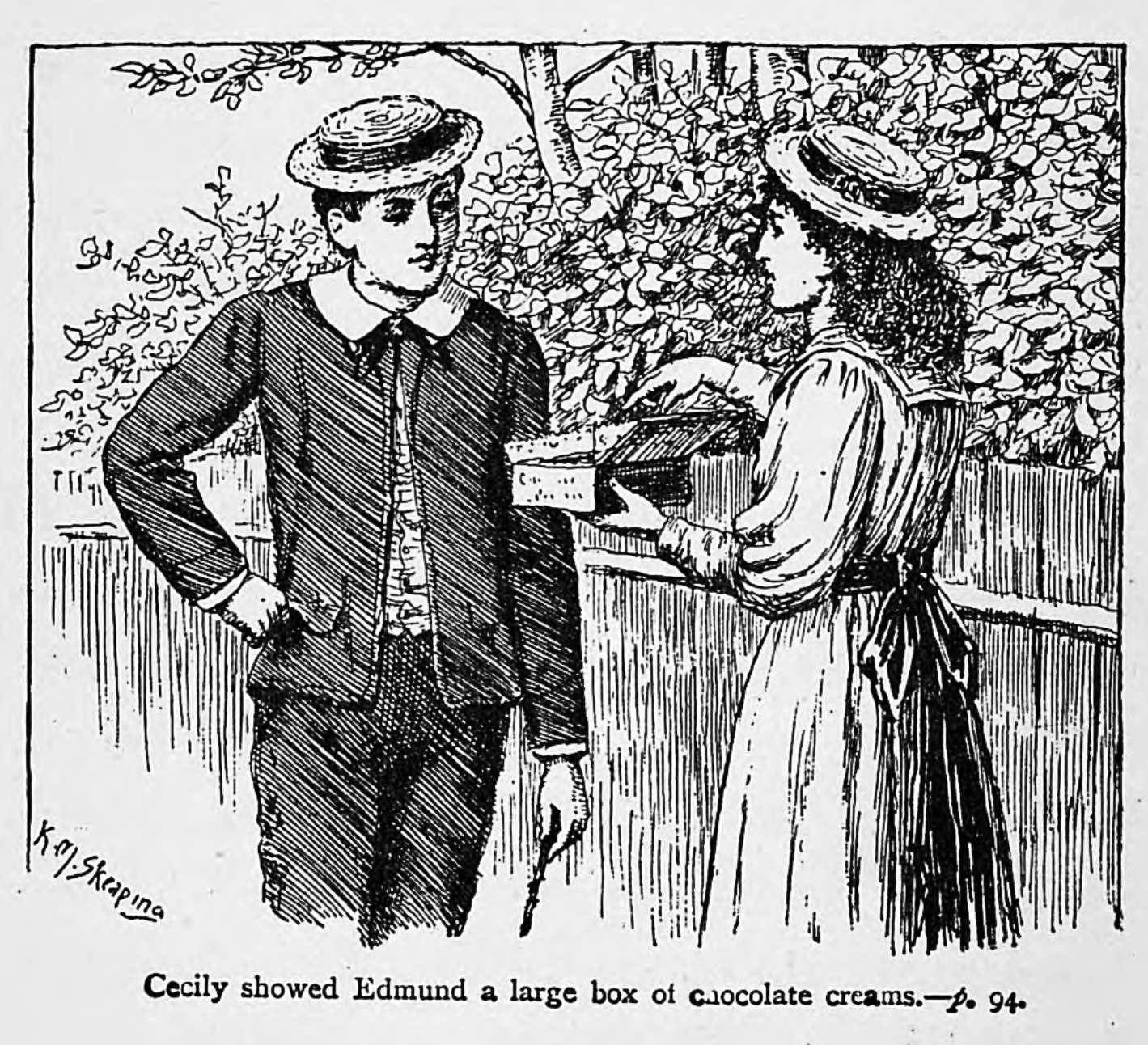
Page-094

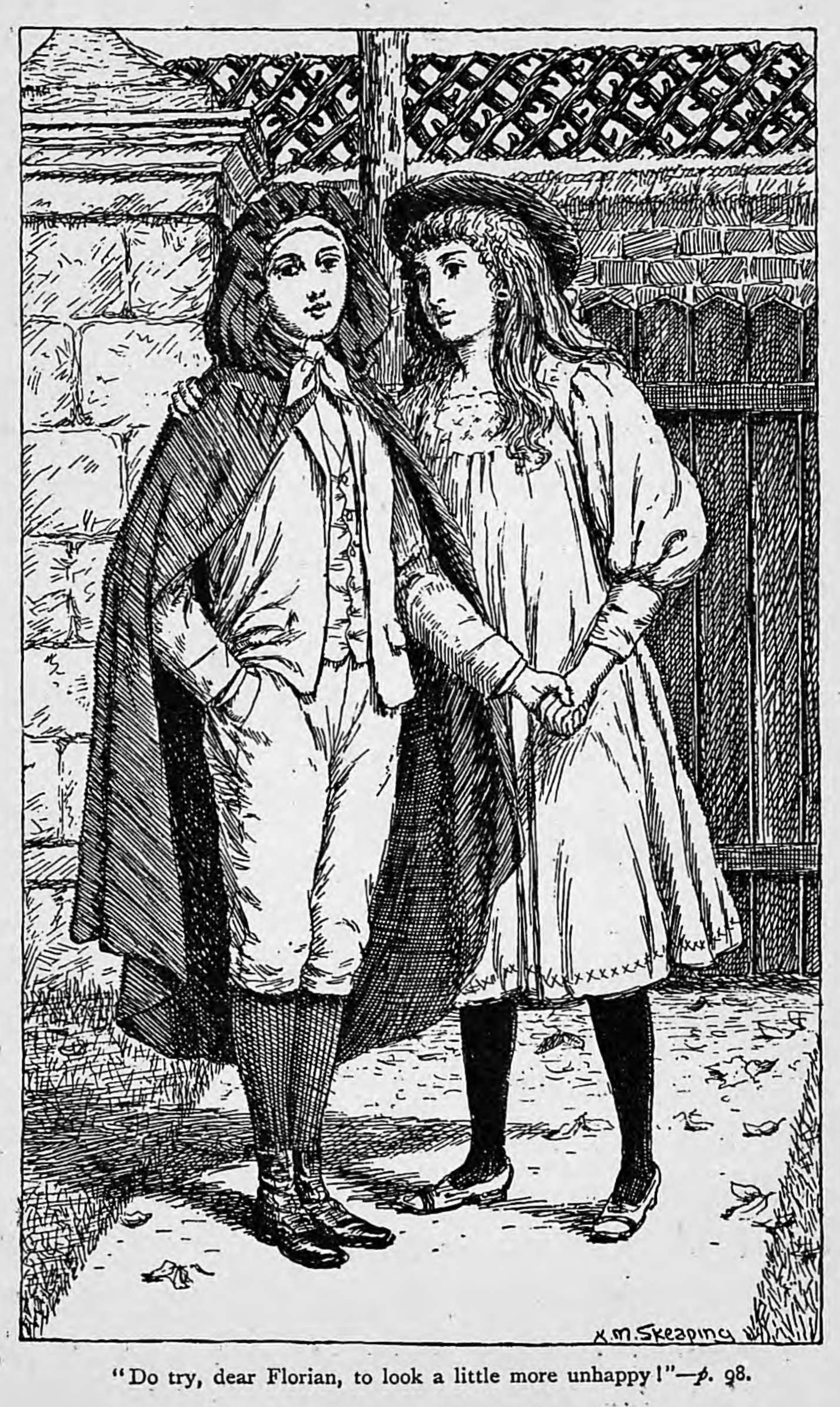
Page-098

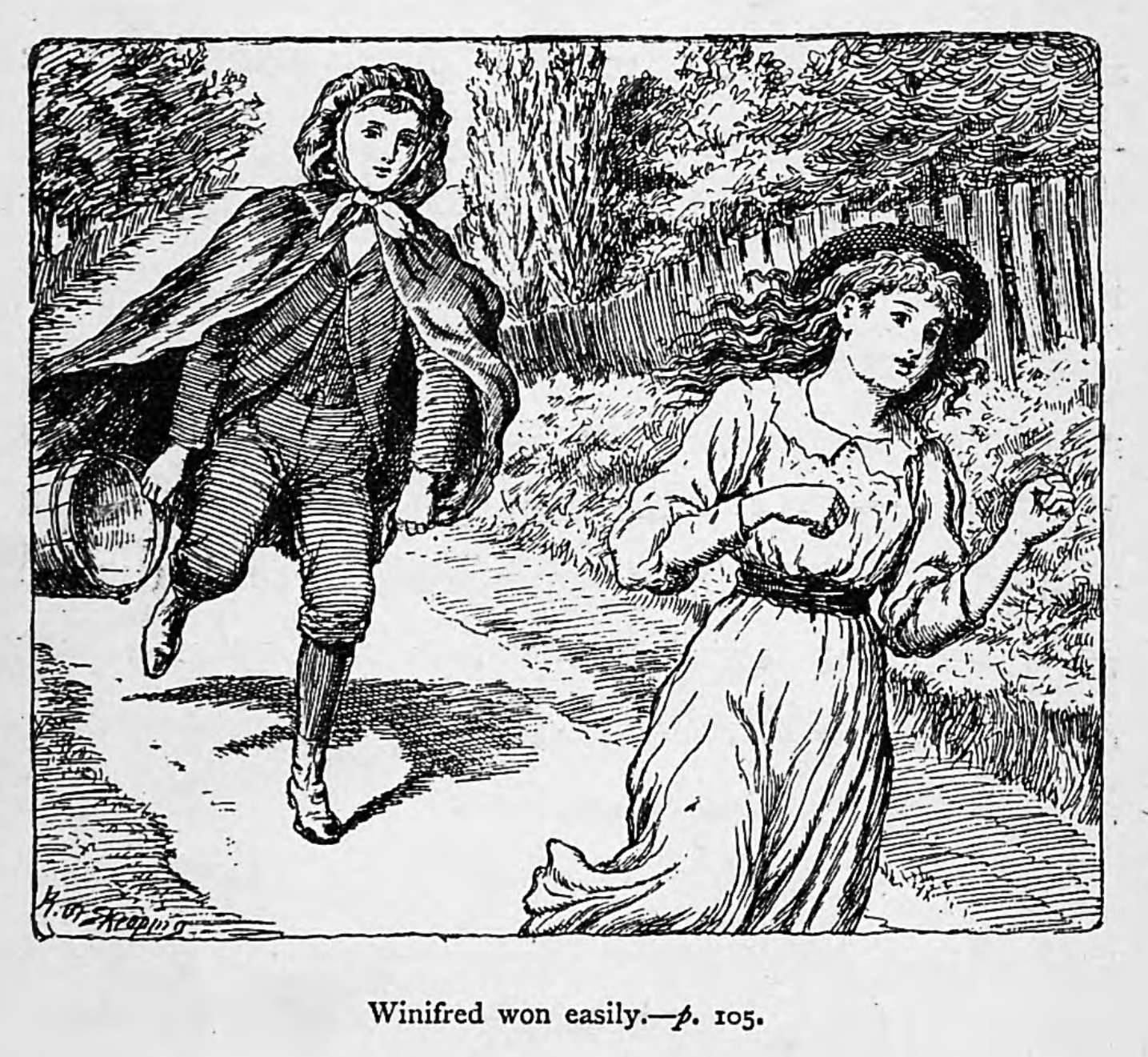
Page-105

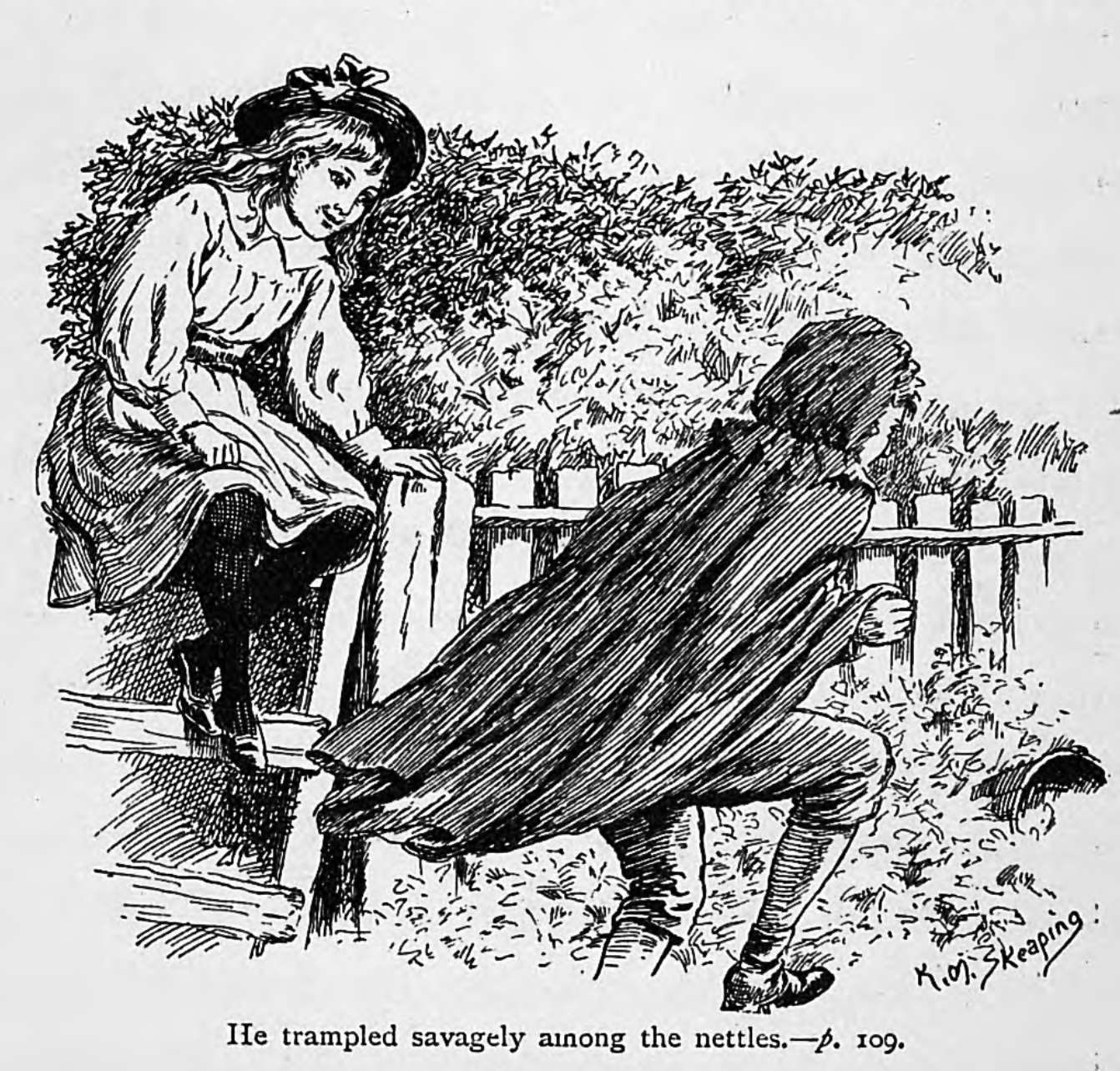
Page-109

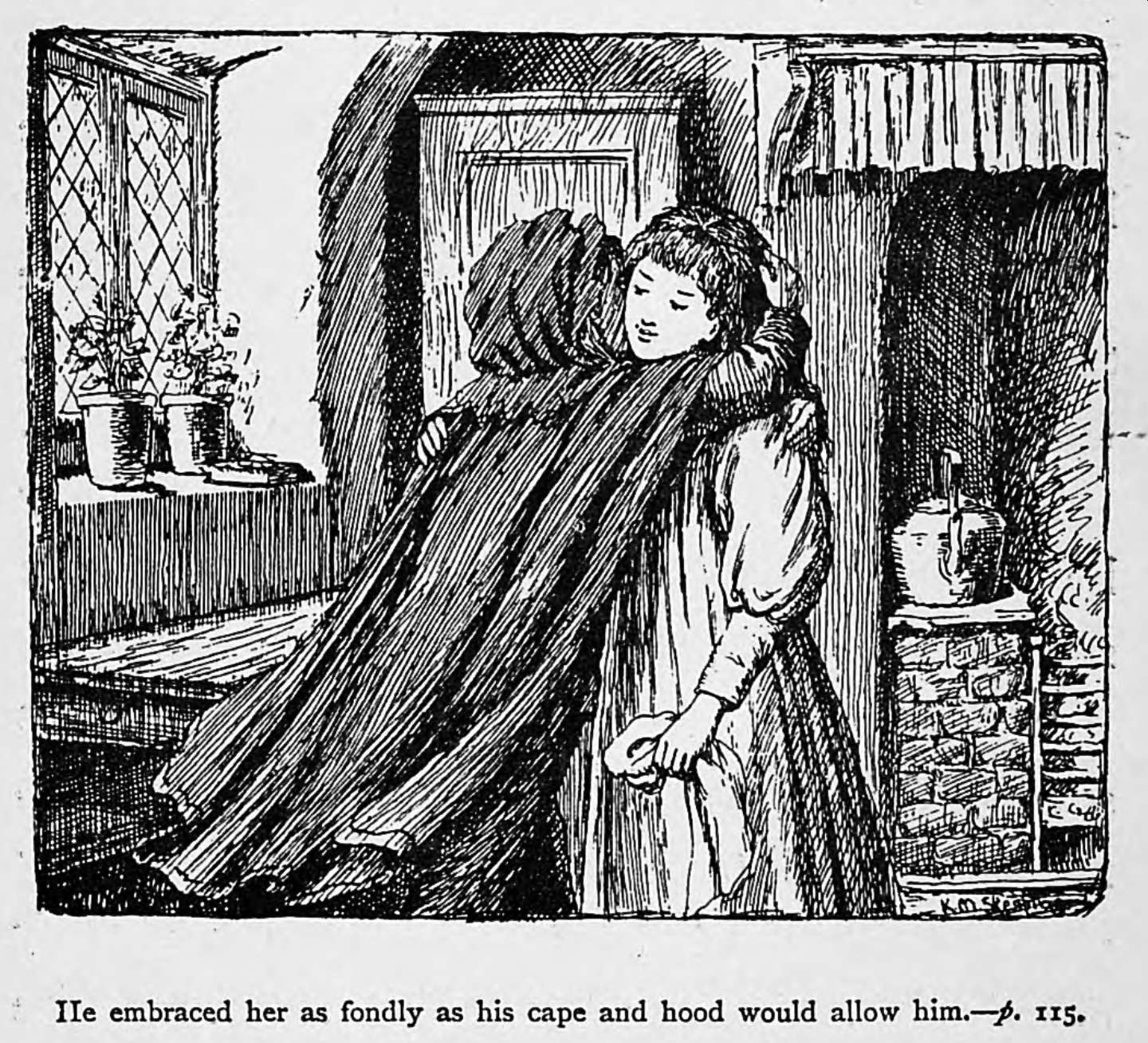
Page-115

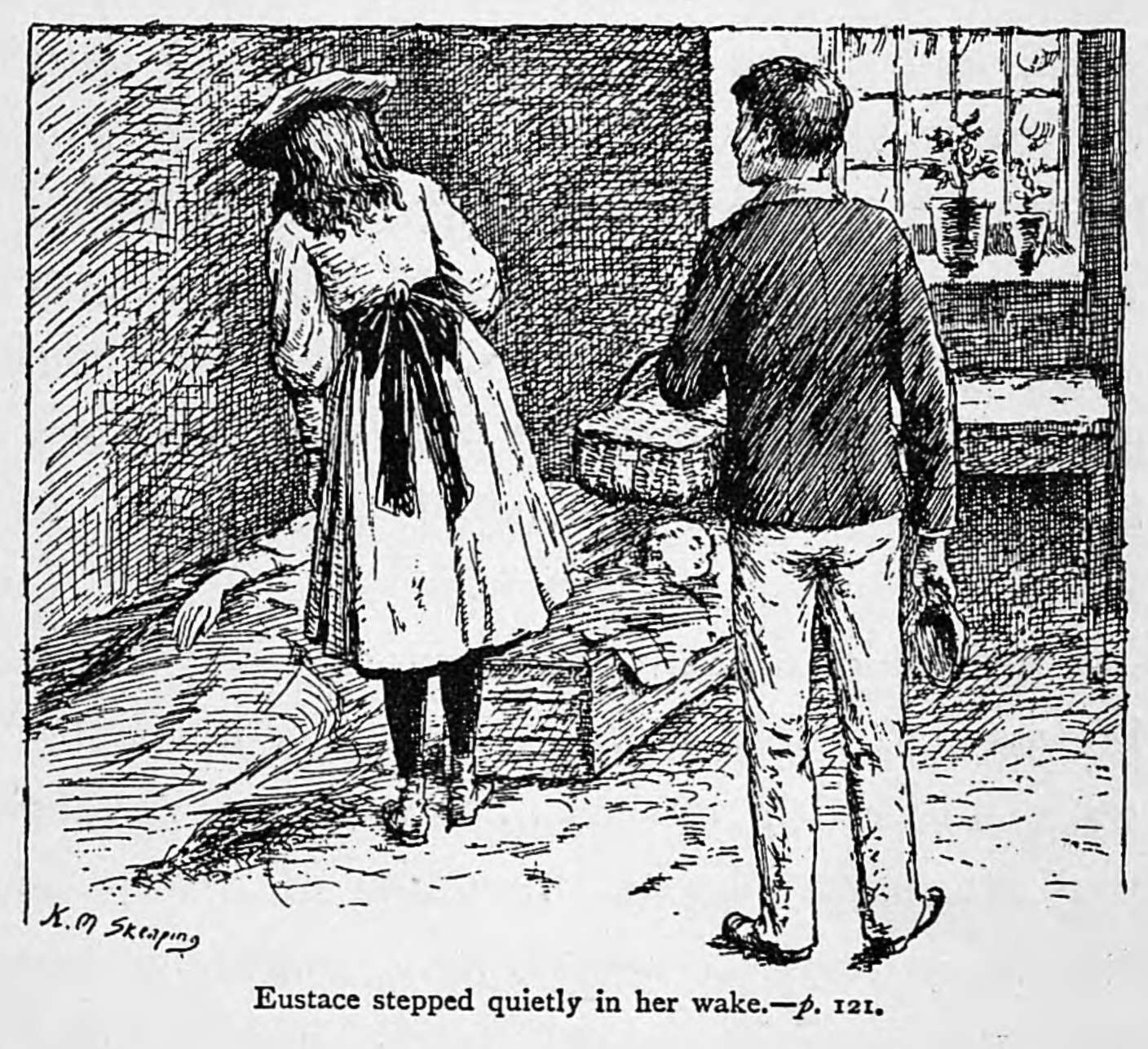
Page-121

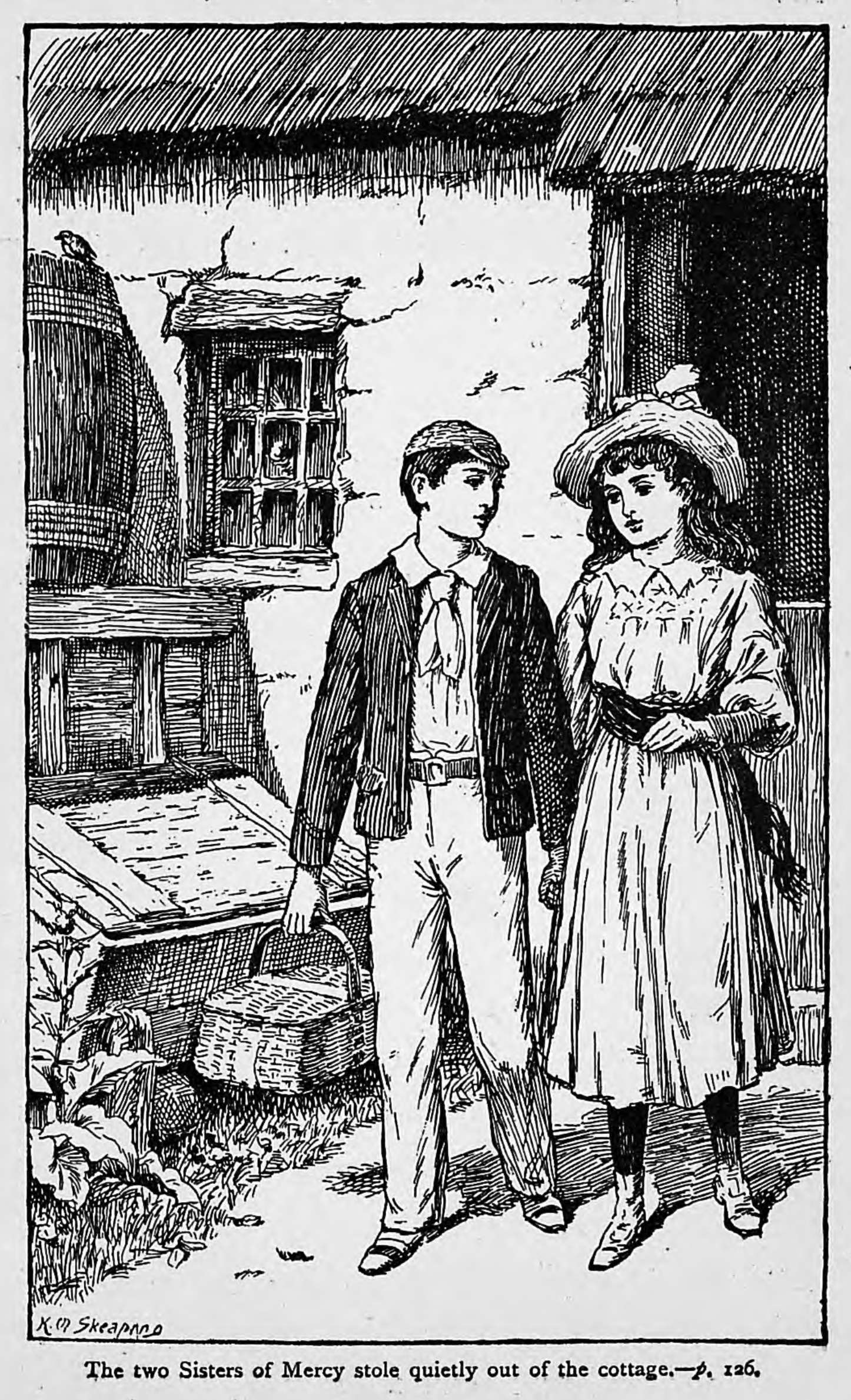
Page-126

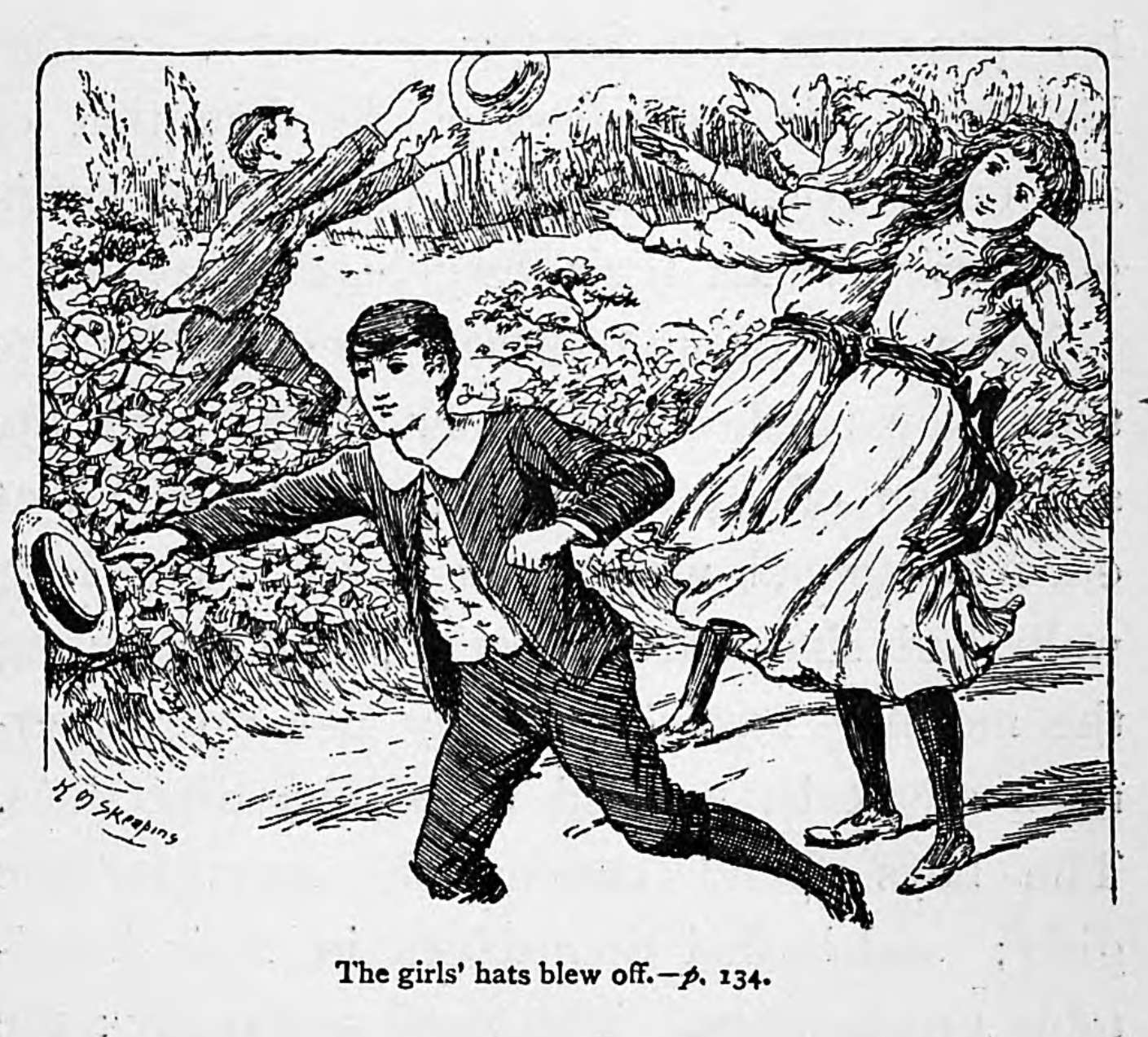
Page-134

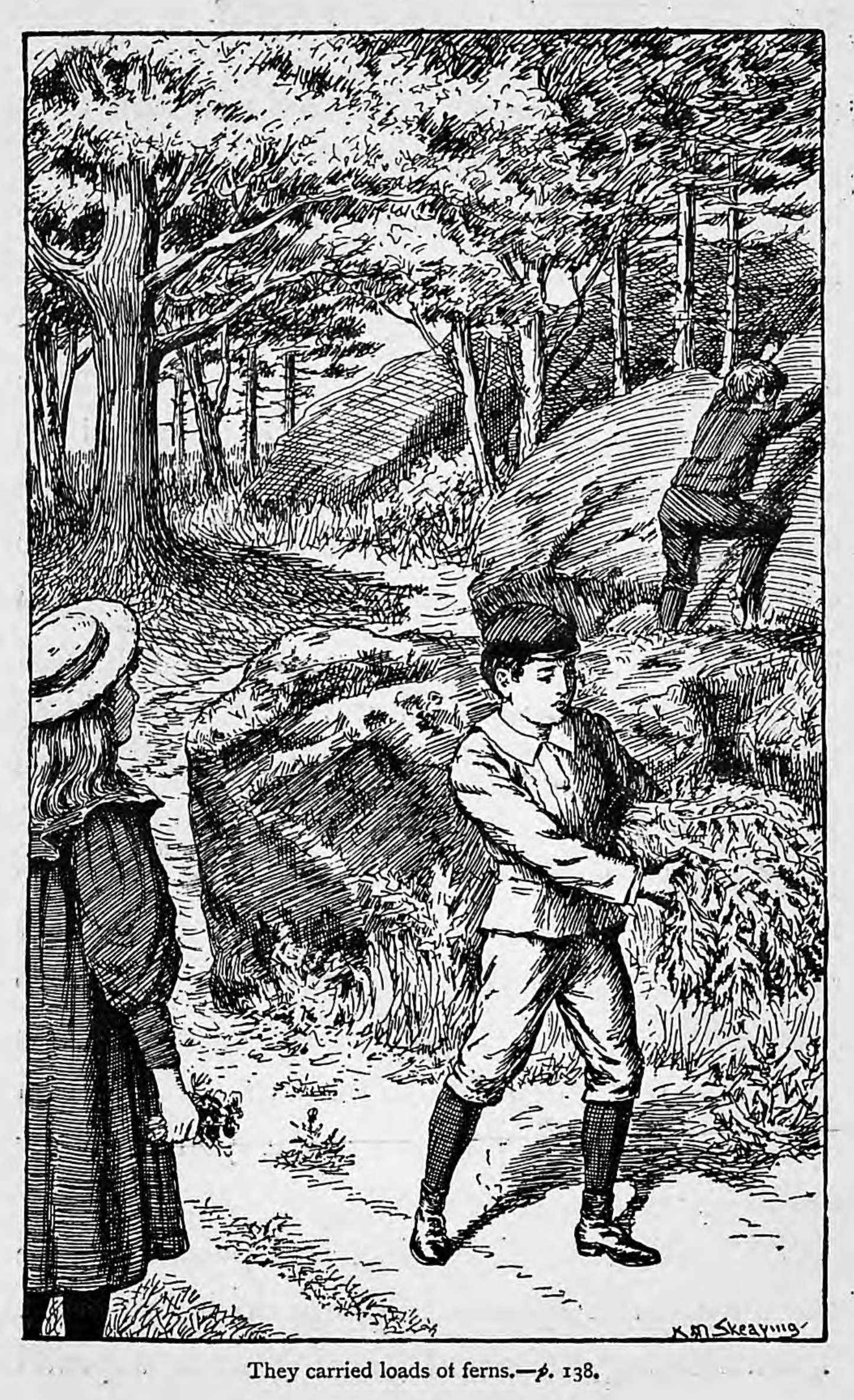
Page-138

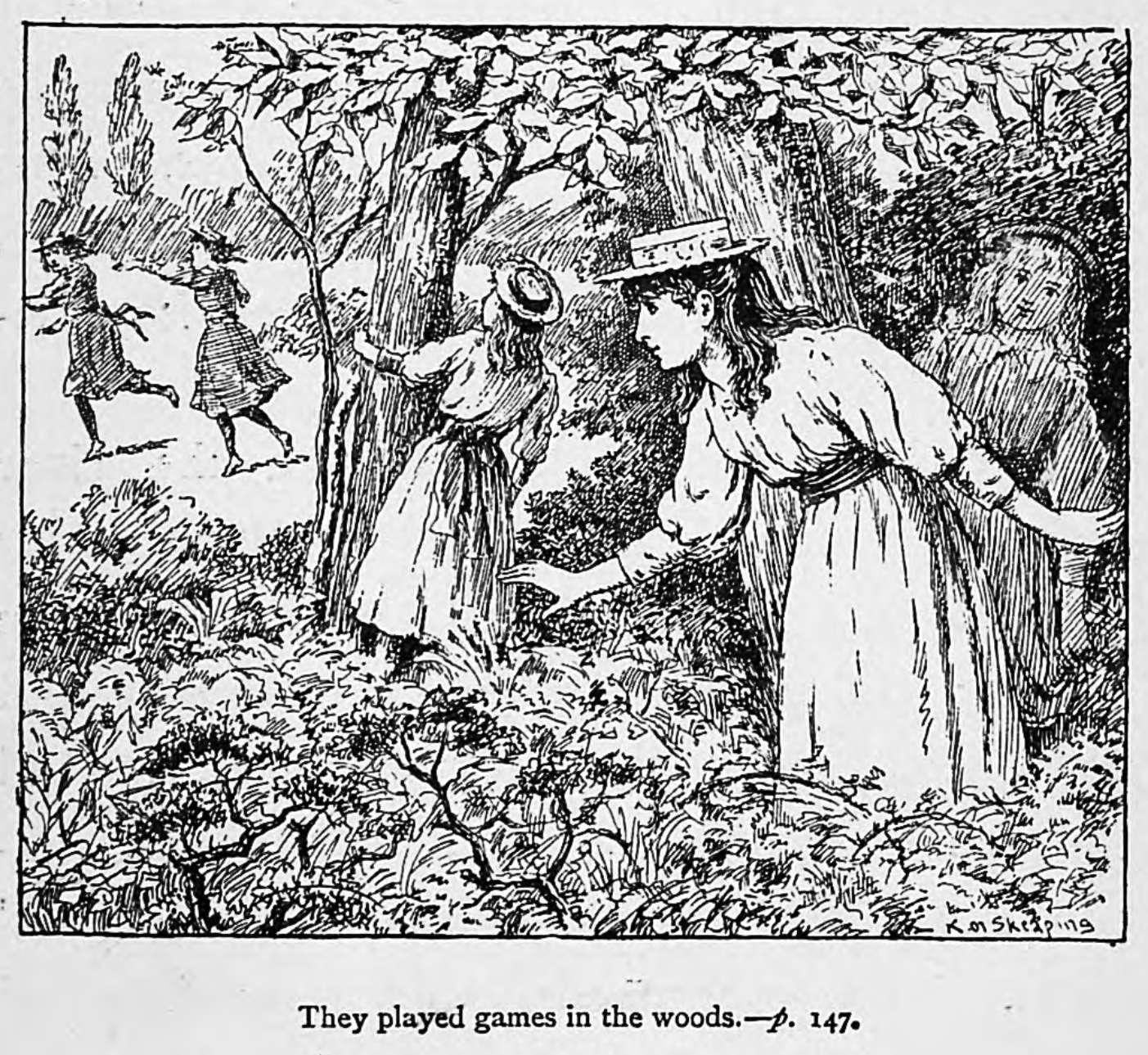
Page-147

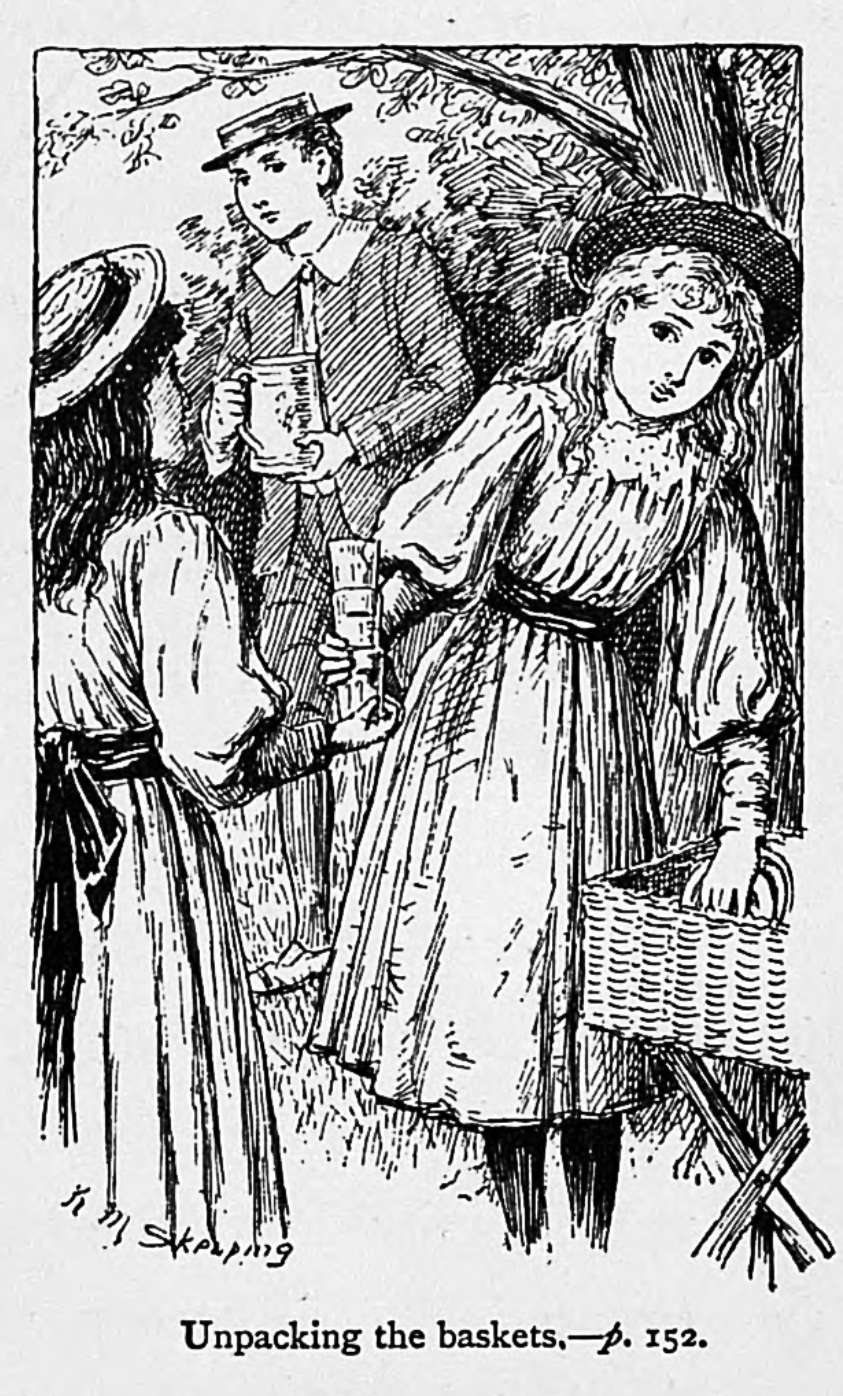
Page-152

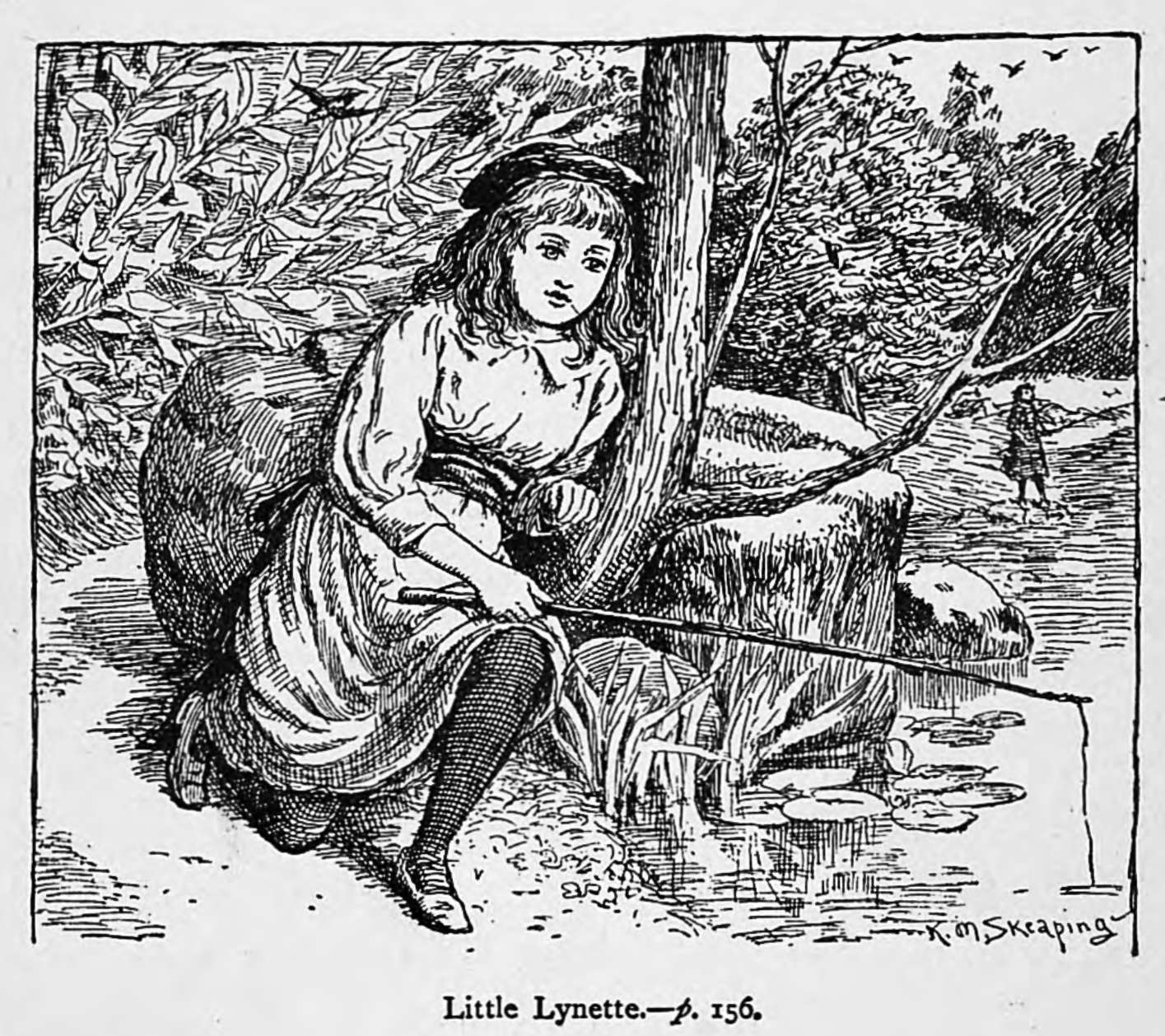
Page-156

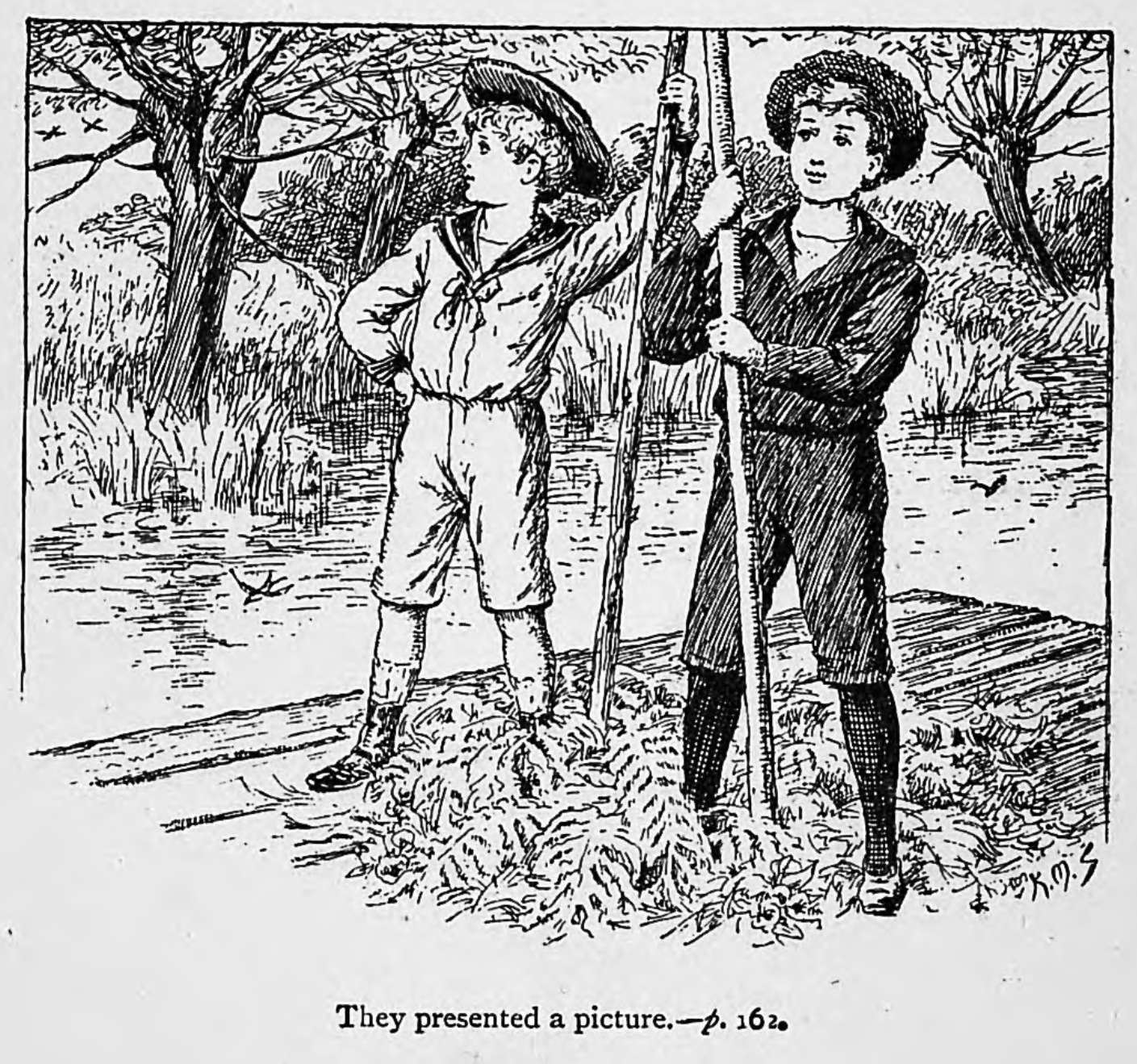
Page-162

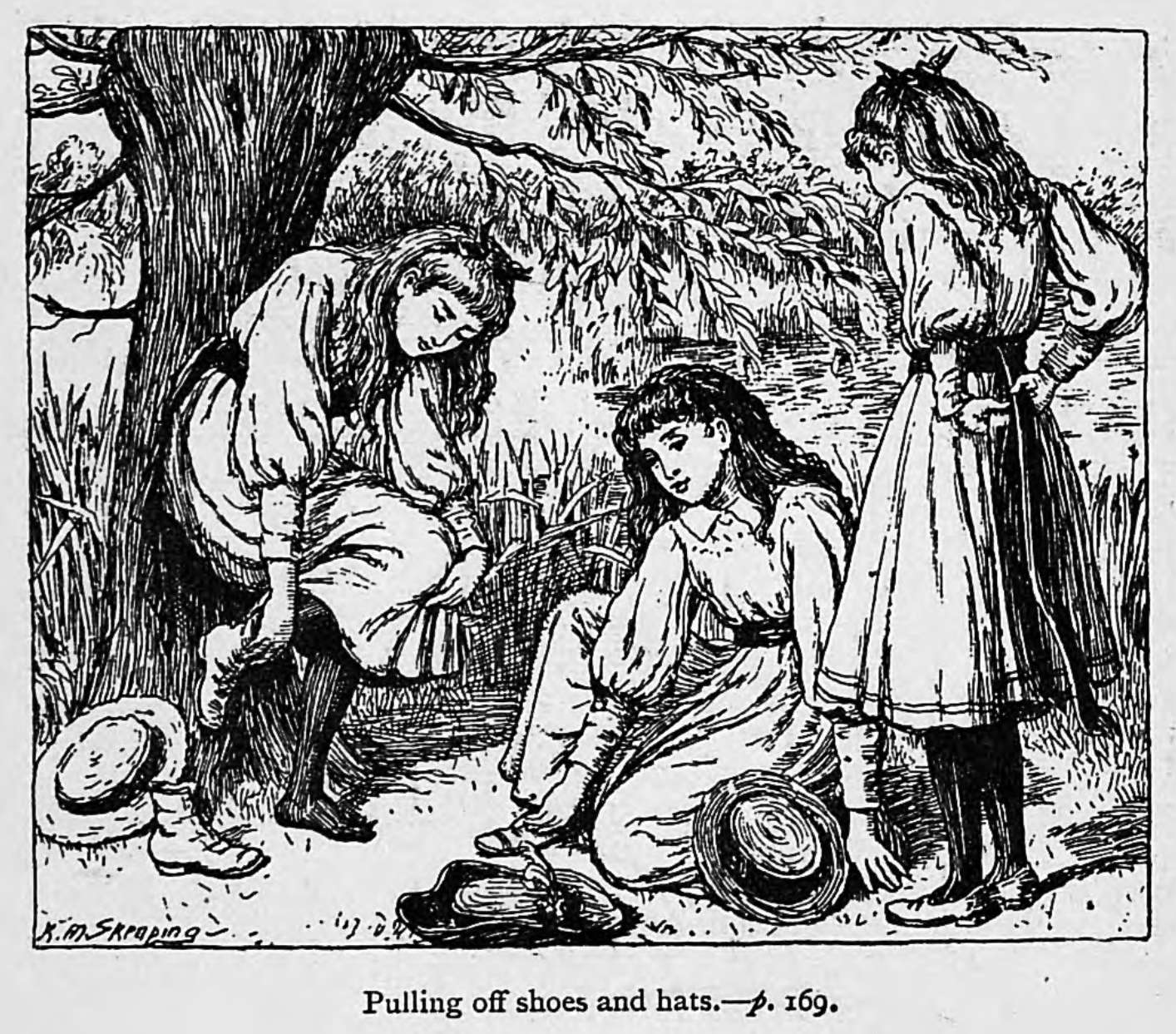
Page-169

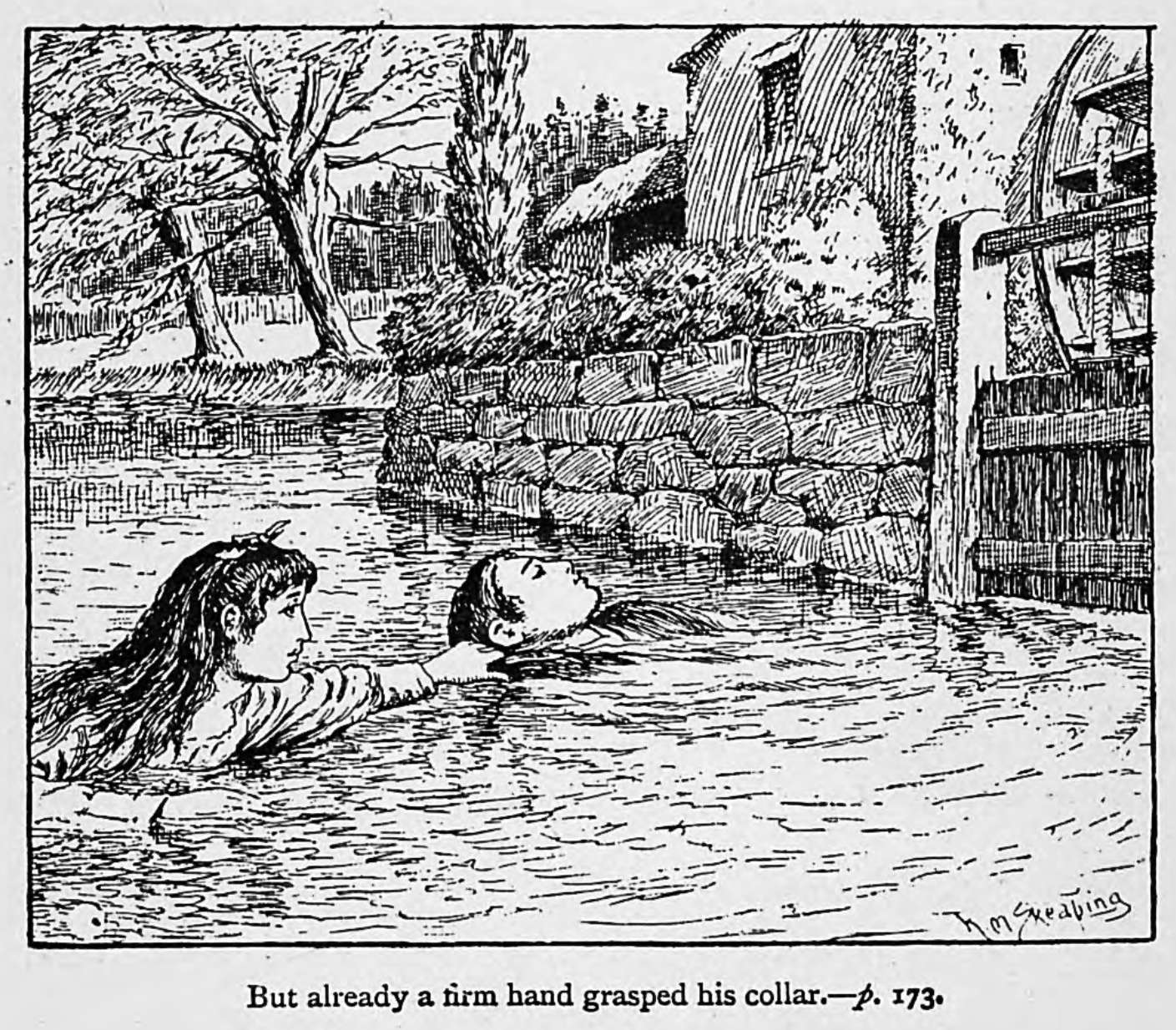
Page-173

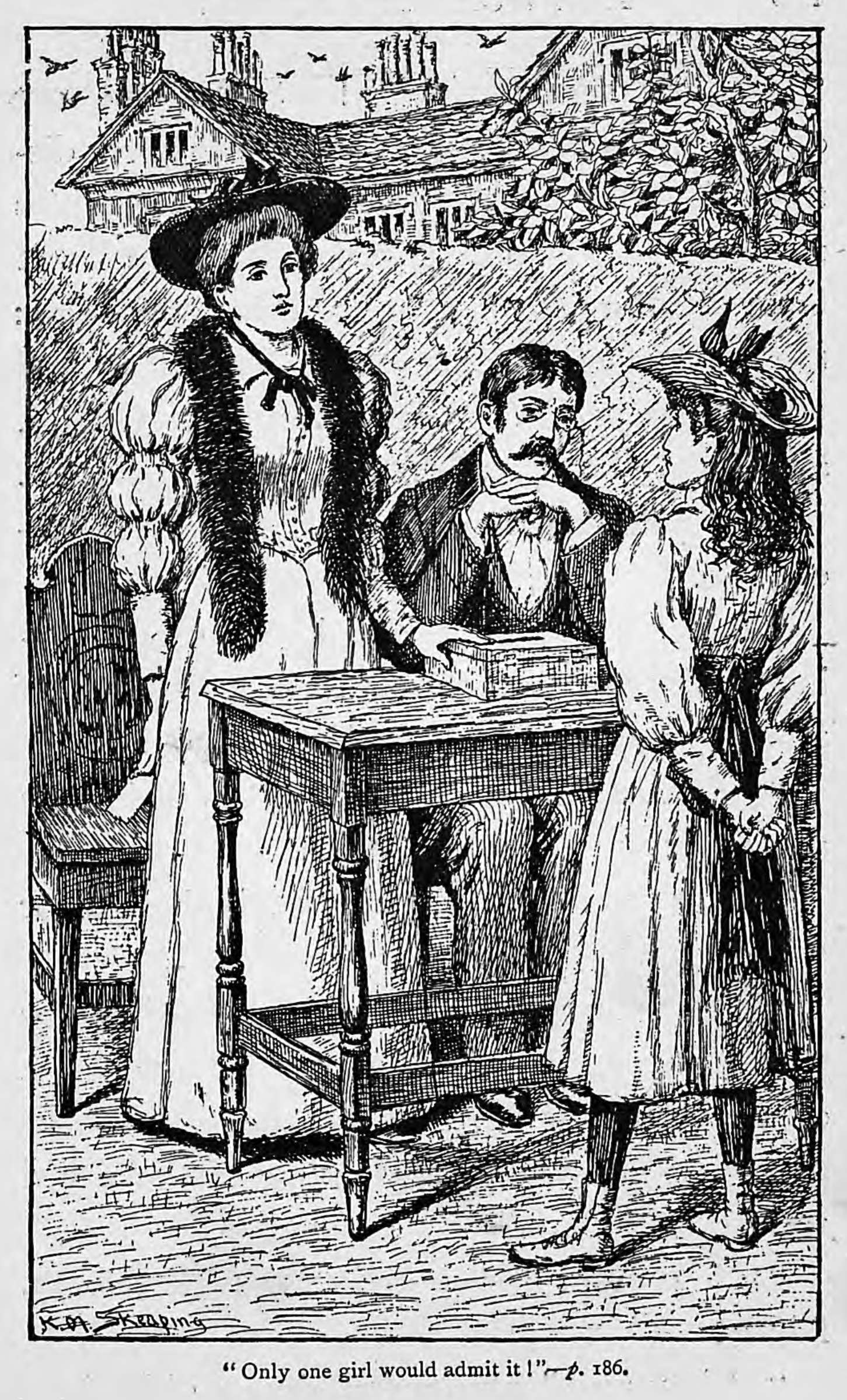
Page-186

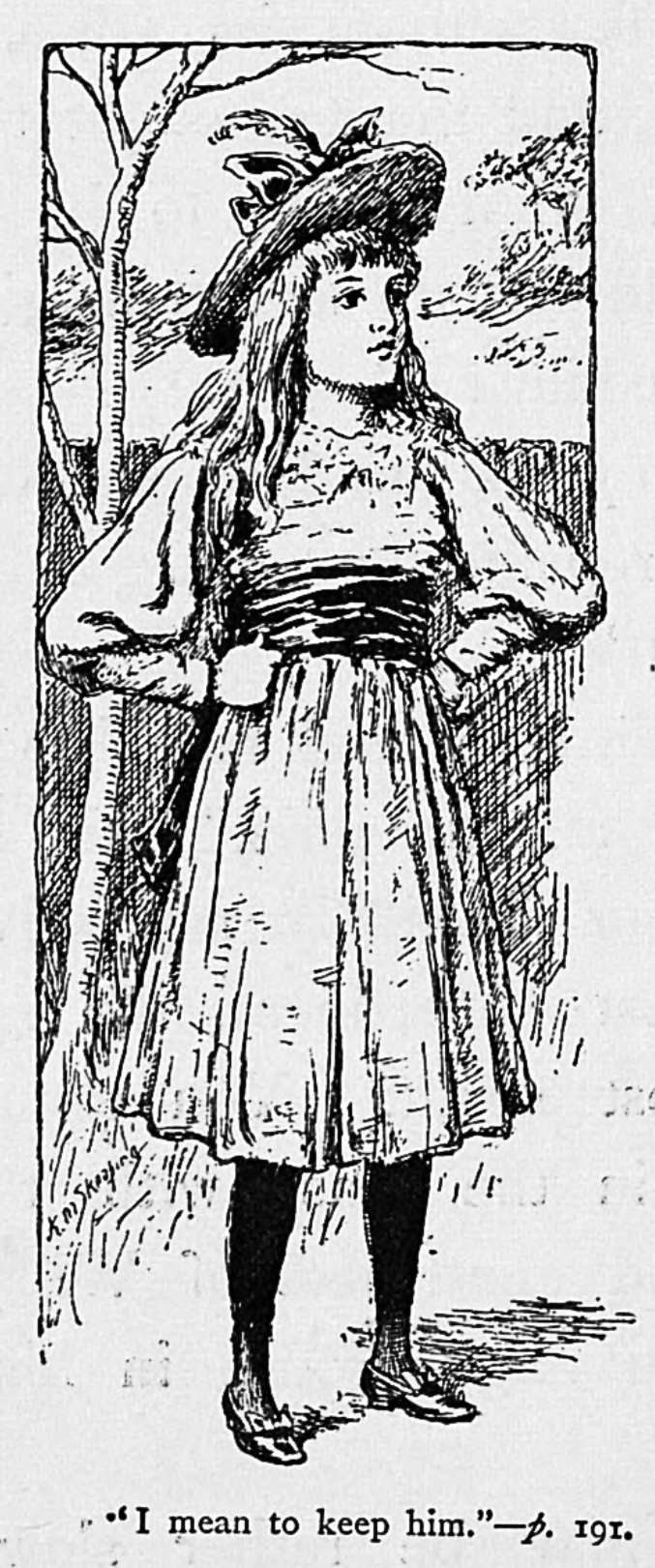
Page-191

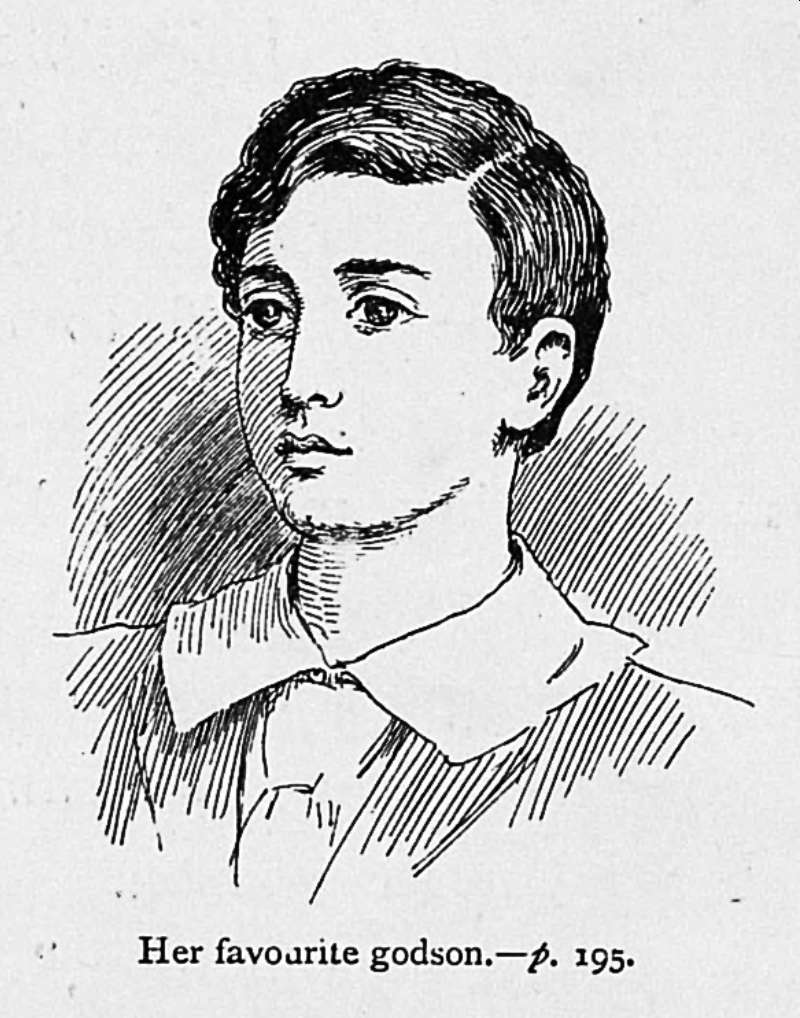
Page-195

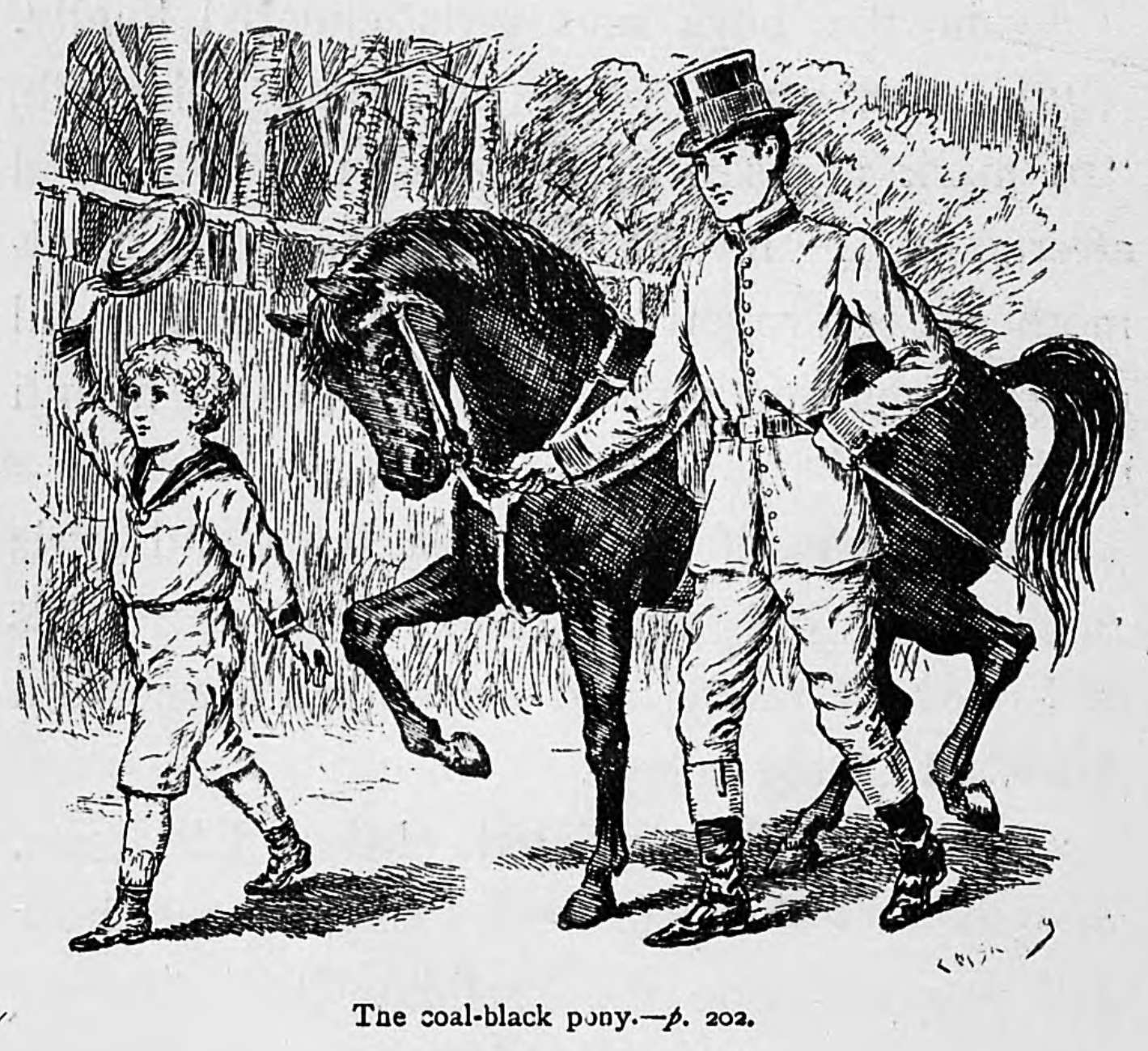
Page-202

== Assessment ==
Sims and Clare state that Adams "typifies the turn-of-the-century girls’ writer in many ways" and that her books "are half-way between the Victorian tale which sought to provide moral edification and its successor which hid the pill in a very heavy coating of sugar." Her obituary (Note: The obituary is credited to "a correspondent" but the evident grief displayed, and the reference to intimate knowledge, suggests it may have been by her sister.) states that Adams "had a strong sympathy with children" and "understood the needs of girls", which enabled here to given to every story a definite plot and real characters.

Sims and Clare state that Adams's treatment of children who have been warped or stunted by neglect on the part of their adult carers is particularly interesting. Many of her books are written from the perspective of the child protagonists. Her first published novel Colonel Russell's Baby is told from the perspective of a girl, who is nine at the start of the story, and is a study of her character, "unsparingly minute in its method". In her case, her mother has died and her father has little time for her, and she suffers at the hands of her Latin master. Robin's Ride is again told from the point of view of the youthful protagonist. Repeatedly, reviewers noted that Adams has a "close knowledge of youthful character and habits", or that her work shows "much knowledge of child life and character". Sims and Clare call her characterisation of two sisters in On Honour, who have been badly brought up by a mean and selfish aunt, "moving and credible". Little Miss Conceit was an "excellent study of child character", where again a child is forced into a role for which she is ill-prepared. In A Queen among Girls the heroine defends her weakly brother from the unfair judgement of her uncle.

Although some of Adams's older heroines aspire to be "new girls" in the sense advocated by Alice Corkran in her editorial of early 1899 in The Girl's Realm, or as described by Sally Mitchell in her landmark 1991 study The New Girl: Girl's Culture in England 1880-1915 they are more firmly wedded to being "nice girls". This is demonstrated by Augusta in A Queen among Girls who abandons her dreams of a professional career, which a reviewer characterises as "selfish dreams", to protect her sickly younger brother from his overbearing uncle, thus exchanging the role of "nice girl" for that of "new girl". In Miss Secretary Ethel Adams make the contrast between "new girls" and "nice girls" all the more obvious in the character of the Girton feminist, quite clearly a "new girl" who is contrasted with the heroine. In this case, the "new girl" of an efficient secretary is replaced by the "nice girl" as she is adopted by her former employer and his wife.
