= Cupitt =

Cupit and Cupitt are surnames. Notable people with these surnames include:

== Cupit ==
- Billy Cupit (1908–1992), English footballer
- Buster Cupit (1927–2023), American golfer
- Jacky Cupit (1938–2026), American golfer

== Cupitt ==
- Don Cupitt (1934–2025), English Anglican priest and lecturer
- Joseph Cupitt (1867–1932), English cricketer
- Joshua Cupitt (2002- ), American collegiate football player

== See also ==
- Cubitt
