= Qubit (disambiguation) =

A qubit is a quantum bit, a unit of quantum information — the quantum analogue of the classical bit.

Qubit may also refer to:

- Qubit (game show), a Canadian game show
- Qubit fluorometer, an instrument used for quantification of DNA, RNA, and protein

== See also ==
- Quettabit (Qbit)
- Cubit (disambiguation)
