= Cubitt =

Cubitt is a surname which may refer to:

== People ==
- Allan Cubitt (born 1954), British television, film, and theatre writer, director, and producer and former teacher
- Benjamin Cubitt (1795–1848), English locomotive engineer, brother of the civil engineer William Cubitt
- Bertram Cubitt (1862–1942), civil servant in the British War Office
- Charlie Cubitt (1890–1968), Australian rugby league footballer, brother of Les Cubitt
- Clayton James Cubitt (born 1972), a.k.a. SIEGE, American art photographer
- David Cubitt (born 1965), English-born Canadian television actor
- Edith Alice Andrews (1873–1958), née Cubitt, British painter and illustrator
- Eleni Cubitt, film maker born in Greece
- George Cubitt, 1st Baron Ashcombe (1828–1917), British politician, son of architect Thomas Cubitt
- Henry Cubitt, 2nd Baron Ashcombe (1867–1947), British politician
- Henry Cubitt, 4th Baron Ashcombe, (1924–2013), British peer
- James Cubitt (1836–1912), English church architect
- Joseph Cubitt (1811–1872), English civil engineer
- Katy Cubitt, British Medieval historian
- Les Cubitt (1892–1968), Australian rugby league player
- Lewis Cubitt (1799–1883), English civil engineer, brother of master builder Thomas Cubitt
- Mark Cubitt, 5th Baron Ashcombe (born 1964), British politician
- Roland Cubitt, 3rd Baron Ashcombe (1899–1962), British peer
- Rosalind Shand (1921–1994), née Cubitt, mother of Queen Camilla
- Thomas Cubitt (1788–1855), British master builder in London
- Thomas Cubitt (British Army officer) (1871–1939), British Army general and Governor of Bermuda
- William Cubitt (1785–1861), English civil engineer and inventor
- William George Cubitt (1835–1903), British Indian Army colonel and recipient of the Victoria Cross
- William Cubitt (British Army officer) (born 1959), British Army retired major general
- William Cubitt (politician) (1791–1863), English engineering contractor and politician

== Fictional characters ==
- Hilton Cubitt, key character in "The Adventure of the Dancing Men", a Sherlock Holmes short story by Sir Arthur Conan Doyle

== See also ==
- Cubit (disambiguation)
- Cupitt, a surname
