= Cubit (disambiguation) =

The cubit is an ancient unit of length.

Cubit may also refer to:

- CUBIT, a multi-touch interface
- Cubit bone or ulna, a bone in the arm
- Bill Cubit (born 1953), American football coach and former player
- Cubit (currency), a fictional currency from the 1978 and 2004 TV series Battlestar Galactica
- Cubit, an item in the Mixels cartoon TV series

== See also ==
- Cubitt, a list of people with the surname
- Qubit (disambiguation)
