= Edith Alice Andrews =

British artist

- Born: Edith Alice Cubitt; 1873; Deptford, London, England
- Died: 1958 (aged 84–85); Pembury, Kent, England
- Education: Goldsmiths' College of Art
- Occupations: Painter and illustrator
- Known for: Painting
- Spouse: George Frow Andrews (m. 1912)

Edith Alice Andrews (née Cubitt; 1873–1958) was a British painter and illustrator.

== Biography ==
Andrews was born in Deptford to Kate and Herbert Cubitt, who were from Surrey and Norfolk respectively. Andrews studied at Goldsmiths' College of Art in London and won a number of medals and prizes while a student. During her career, Andrews illustrated books, including children's books, for several publishers, including the Oxford University Press, Cassell, Blackie and Son and Ernest Nister. She also created flower paintings, portrait pictures and miniatures. One of her designs was used as publicity by the Great Western Railway.

Andrews was a regular exhibitor at the Royal Academy in London between 1905 and 1954 and with the Society of Women Artists during the 1920s. She also exhibited with the Royal Institute of Oil Painters, the Royal Institute of Painters in Watercolours, at the Paris Salon and at the Walker Art Gallery in Liverpool. Andrews lived at High Wycombe for a time and then at Pembury in Kent. The Victoria and Albert Museum in London holds examples of her book illustrations.
