= Kalākaua's Privy Council of State =

Advisory body of the Kingdom of Hawaii

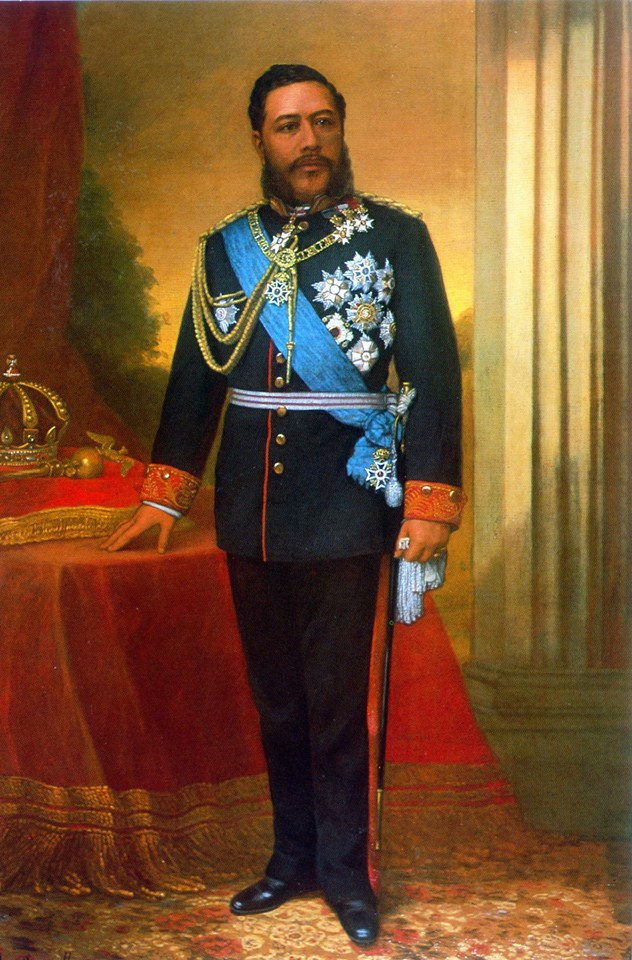
King Kalākaua painting by William F. Cogswell

The Privy Council of State of the Kingdom of Hawaii was a constitutionally-created body purposed to advise and consent to acts made by the monarch. The cabinet ministers were ex-officio members. Both the cabinet and other privy counselors were appointed and dismissed by the monarch according to his personal wishes. The 1887 Constitution of the Kingdom of Hawaii made a key change in regards to the cabinet ministers. The monarch was still empowered to appoint the ministers, but only the legislature, or a voluntary resignation, could remove them from office.

The 91 men listed below served in varied years as Kalākaua's Privy Council of State. The list is gleaned from the Hawaii State Archives Office Records, the Minutes of the Privy Council, 1873–1892, and the Hawaiian Registers and Directories for 1873–1893, published in Thomas G. Thrum’s Hawaiian Almanac and Annual. The century-old archived records are often spotty, and should not be considered complete.

== Background and diversity ==
Kalākaua retained many of the counselors who had been advising the kingdom's monarchs since Kamehameha III. The culturally diverse body was represented by men who were native Hawaiians and Asians, as well as American and British immigrants. Native Hawaiian brothers John Tamatoa Baker and Robert Hoapili Baker who served on the Privy Council, posed as the models for the Kamehameha statues ordered by Kalākaua. The statues are now tourist attractions in Hilo, North Kohala, and in front of Aliʻiōlani Hale in Honolulu.

The counselors were diverse in occupations and personal finances. Henry Martyn Whitney founded two newspapers. Frederick H. Hayselden was the sheriff of the island of Maui. William Buckle was warden of Oahu Jail. Longest serving royal court member was Charles Reed Bishop, who advised monarchs for over three decades, from Kamehameha IV to Liliʻuokalani. Chun Afong emigrated from China at age 24 to clerk in his uncle's retail trade, possessing a business acumen that eventually brought him great wealth on both sides of the Pacific Ocean. He left the Privy Council shortly after being appointed, to accept the position of Chinese consular agent for Hawaii. British born William Lowthian Green had been a prospector during the California Gold Rush, before helping establish the Honolulu Iron Works.

Several on his council, such as Henry A. P. Carter and Curtis P. Iaukea, were experienced diplomats. Elisha H. Allen came from a family dedicated to government service. His father Samuel Clesson Allen had been a US Congressman from Massachusetts. Before moving to Hawaii, Elisha had been a US Congressman from Maine, and US Counsel to Hawaii. After relocating, he served 27 years as Minister Plenipotentiary from the Kingdom of Hawaii to the US. While the king's 1874–75 state visit to the United States generated American legislative support for the Reciprocity Treaty of 1875, Carter and Allen had preceded him in Washington, D.C. to lead the negotiations. Elisha Allen's son William Fessenden Allen served as an advisor for both Kalākaua and Liliʻuokalani. Privy counselors William Nevins Armstrong, Charles Hastings Judd and George W. Macfarlane accompanied the king on his 1881 world tour to negotiate plantation labor contracts with friendly nations.

== Changes in the cabinet ==
After the financial success of the reciprocity treaty, Kalākaua began surrounding himself with advisors who told him what he wanted to hear, instead of those who would act as a balance between the ambitions of the monarchy and the needs of the kingdom. He appointed Walter Murray Gibson as his Prime Minister, charged with carrying out the king's agenda, and subsequently creating a large turnover in his cabinet. Italian soldier of fortune Celso Caesar Moreno was appointed Minister of Foreign Affairs, and forced to resign after four days when denied recognition by the diplomatic corps stationed in Hawaii. The legislature passed the 1887 constitution as a means to create checks and balances over the king's decision making.

== Death of Kalākaua ==
A leisure trip to San Francisco in 1890 was Kalākaua's final trip abroad. He was in failing health, accompanied by George W. Macfarlane and Robert Hoapili Baker. During a month of rest and recreation in California, he met with Minister Carter to discuss the McKinley Tariff. He died in San Francisco on January 20, 1891. MacFarlane and Baker, as well as the king's handmaiden Kalua and valet Kahikina, were at his bedside. Counselors Godfrey Rhodes and Charles Reed Bishop were also in the room.

== Privy council members ==
Name	Portrait	Privy council service years	Notes	Ref(s)
Edward P. Adams		June 1879	President of the Kilauea Sugar Company founding member of the Planters Labor and Supply Company	
Chun Afong		June 5, 1879	Resigned shortly after appointment to become Chinese consular agent for Hawaii	
Luther Aholo		Aug 1884	Minister of the Interior; Oct 13, 1886 -July 1, 1887	
Elisha Hunt Allen		Sept. 5, 1853 – June 11, 1857; Aug 31, 1857 –	All Privy Councils since Kamehameha III; House of Nobles 1854–1856	
William Fessenden Allen		June 5, 1879 – Mar 7, 1891	Colonel on staffs of Kamehameha V, Lunalilo and Kalākaua	
William Nevins Armstrong			House of Nobles 1880–1882; Attorney General; Nov 29, 1880 – Jan 17, 1881; Nov 5, 1881– May 19, 1882	
Clarence W. Ashford			Attorney General; July 1, 1887 – June 14, 1890	
Joseph Ballard Atherton		1887–1891	President of Castle & Cooke, Ltd.	
John Tamatoa Baker		1884–1891	Household troops, King's Guard, High Sheriff of the island of Hawaii. Kalākaua appointed his wife Ululani Lewai Baker as Governess of the Island of Hawaii. He and his brother Robert were the male models for the Kamehameha statues commissioned during Kalākaua's reign.	
Robert Hoapili Baker		1884–1891	Colonel and aide-de-camp on Kalākaua's staff, at the king's bedside when he died January 20, 1891. Household troops, King's Guard, Governor of Maui, Molokai, Lanai. He and his brother John were the male models for the Kamehameha statues commissioned during Kalākaua's reign.	
Charles Reed Bishop		June 9, 1859 – 1891	All Privy Councils since Kamehameha IV; Minister of Foreign Affairs; Jan 10, 1873 – Feb 17, 1874 House of Nobles 1859–1886; At Kalākaua's bedside when he died January 20, 1891	
Edwin Harbottle Boyd		1874	House of Representatives 1864–1870; Chamberlain to Kalākaua 1874–1875; father of James Harbottle Boyd and Robert Napuʻuako Boyd	
Godfrey Brown			House of Nobles 1887–1890; Minister of Foreign Affairs; July 1 – Dec 28, 1887; Minister of Finance; July 17, 1890 – Feb 25, 1891	
William Wahinepiʻo Buckle		Sept 4, 1880 – Dec 18, 1883	William Wahinepiʻo Kahakuhaʻakoi Buckle; Warden of Oahu Jail, 1882–1883	
John Edward Bush		Sept 1, 1878 – 1891	House of Nobles 1880–1886; Minister of Foreign Affairs (acting); Aug 19 – Sept 22, 1880; Minister of Finance; May 20 – Aug 8, 1882; Minister of the Interior; Aug 8, 1882 – May 14, 1883	
Henry A. P. Carter		Sept 28, 1874 – 1891	Minister of Foreign Affairs; Dec 5, 1874 – Mar 1, 1878; Minister of the Interior; Sept 27, 1880 – May 20, 1882; Attorney General; Jan 17 – Nov 5, 1881; Minister to the United States; Feb 9, 1883 – Aug 24,1891; Envoy posts Europe 1877, Portugal 1881, France 1882, Germany 1885	
Samuel Northrup Castle		All Privy Councils since Kamehameha V Dec 7 1863 – Feb 23, 1874	House of Nobles 1876–1880	
Archibald Scott Cleghorn		Jan 22, 1873 – 1891	Holdover from Lunalilo; Husband of Likelike; House of Nobles 1873–1886	
Robert James Creighton			House of Nobles 1886; Minister of Foreign Affairs; June 30 – Oct 13, 1886; Father of Liliʻuokalani's Attorney General Charles F. Creighton	
John Adams Cummins		June 18, 1874 – Mar 7, 1891	House of Nobles 1890–1892; Minister of Foreign Affairs; Jun 17, 1890 – Feb 25, 1891	
Samuel Mills Damon		Aug 12, 1884 – Mar 7, 1891	Minister of Finance; July 22, 1889 – June 17, 1890	
John T. Dare			House of Nobles Jul 5, – Oct 13, 1886; Attorney General; Jul 1- Oct 13, 1886; Legal counsel to Claus Spreckels; Prior legislative service in the Arizona Territory, and subsequently in the California State Assembly.	
John Owen Dominis		Dec 24, 1863 – 1891	Husband of Liliuokalani; All Privy Councils since Kamehameha V House of Nobles 1864–1886	
James Isaac Dowsett Sr.		Feb 2, 1876	House of Nobles 1873–1888; In the legislature during the Honolulu Courthouse riot. Hawaiian name "Kimo Pelekaue". Building dedicated to him in 1950. First white child born in Hawaii who was not of missionary lineage. Advisor to Kam IV and V. Owned all the property on the waterfront.	
John Ena		1888–1891	House of Nobles 1892	
Walter M. Gibson		Sept 1880	House of Nobles 1882–1886; Minister of Foreign Affairs; May 20, 1882 – June 30, 1886; Oct 13, 1886 – July 1, 1887; Attorney General (acting); May 14- Dec 14, 1883; Sept 18, 1884 – Aug 3, 1885 (ad interim); Minister of the Interior (acting); May 14, 1883 – Aug 6, 1883; June 30, 1886 – Oct 13, 1886; Prime Minister; June 30, 1886 – Oct 13, 1886	
William Lowthian Green		Feb 23, 1874 – Mar 5, 1877	House of Nobles 1874–1892; Minister of Foreign Affairs; Feb 17, 1874 – Dec 5, 1876; Sept 22, 1880 – May 20, 1882; Minister of Finance; Jul 1, 1887 – Jul 22, 1889	
Charles T. Gulick			House of Nobles 1884–1892; Minister of the Interior; Aug 6, 1883 – June 30, 1886; Sept 12, 1892 – Nov 1, 1892; Minister of Finance (acting); Sept 1, 1885	
Edwin Oscar Hall		Sept 6, 1849 – Sept 26, 1850, Jan 22, 1873	Privy Counselor for Kamehameha III; House of Nobles 1873–1874	
Charles Coffin Harris		Aug 26, 1862 – Feb 23, 1874	All Privy Councils since Kamehameha IV; House of Nobles 1864–1872	
Alfred S. Hartwell		Jan 23, 1873 – Jan 23, 1874	Holdover from Lunalilo; House of Nobles 1874–1878	
Frederick H. Hayselden		1886–1891	Born in England, son-in-law of Walter Murray Gibson. Sheriff of Maui, inherited the island of Lanai from Gibson.	
John Green Hoapili		1883	House of Nobles 1891–1892	
Ferdinand William Hutchison		1864–1874	All Privy Councils since Kamehameha V House of Nobles 1866–1872	
Curtis P. Iaukea		1883–1891	King's private secretary, career diplomat, office holder, and military officer for the Kingdom, Provisional Government, and Territory of Hawaii	
William G. Irwin		1886–1891	Business and investment banking partner of Claus Spreckels and former California governor F. F. Low. DBA as Claus Spreckels & Co, the partnership circulated the Kalākaua coinage in Hawaii and floated loans to the monarchy/government. Irwin was also a partner of Samuel Gardner Wilder in the steamship business.	
W. Claude Jones			Attorney General; Aug 14, 1880 – Sept 27, 1880	
Albert Francis Judd		Jan 22, 1873 – Feb 19, 1874	Holdover from Lunalilo; House of Nobles 1873–1875	
Charles Hastings Judd		Oct 29, 1875	House of Nobles 1879–1886	
Simon Kaloa Kaʻai		Dec 10, 1877	House of Nobles 1876–1882; Minister of Finance; July 3, 1878 – Aug 14, 1880; Aug 8, 1882 – Feb 13, 1883; Minister of the Interior; May 20, 1882 – Aug 8, 1882	
J. Kahai		1874		
David Kahanu		1879–1891	Appointed to Kalākaua's Privy Council June 25, 1879	
Henry A. Kahanu		Dec 7, 1863 – Jan 22, 1873	All Privy Councils since Kamehameha V House of Nobles 1864–1880	
Simon P. Kalama		1864–1874	All Privy Councils since Kamehameha V House of Representatives 1853–1870	
A. Kalauli		1874	House of Representatives 1880	
Charles Kanaʻina		Jul 29, 1845 – 1855	Privy Counselor for Kamehameha III and Kamehameha IV; Father of King Lunalilo; House of Nobles 1841–1876	
Paul Puhiula Kanoa		June 27, 1883 – Mar 1888	House of Nobles 1882–1892	
Paul Kanoa		Oct 21, 1846 – Feb 23, 1874	All Privy Councils since Kamehameha III; House of Nobles 1845–1882	
John Mākini Kapena		1874	House of Nobles 1876–1886	
John Kauhane			House of Nobles 1890	
John Lot Kaulukoʻu		June 27, 1883	Attorney General; Oct 13- Oct 23, 1886	
John K. Kaunamano		1884–1891		
Joseph Ulumaialii Kawainui		Feb 23, 1874	(1842 – Oct 23, 1895); Attended the Royal School. Editor of the newspaper Ka Nupepa Kūʻokoʻa. Member of the Republic's Council of State	
David Leleo Kinimaka		1880–1883	Kalākaua's hanai half-brother, son of High Chief Kinimaka and Pai, his Tahitian wife. Member of the royal guards.	
Samuel Kipi			House of Nobles 1878	
Moses Kuaea		1879–1882	Minister of Finance; Aug 14 – Sept 27, 1880 pastor of Kaumakapili Church	
Huaka Kuihelani		1883	House of Nobles 1873–1883	
William Pitt Leleiohoku II		Aug 15, 1874	Kalākaua's brother House of Nobles Jan 10,1887; Died Apr 9, 1887	
Edward Kamakau Lilikalani		1883	1883 Privy Council; 1889 Capt. King's Staff; 1890, 1st Lt. King's Guards; 1892, Col. Queen's Staff; Royal Order of Oceania, Order of Oceania, Order of Kalakaua, Order of Kapiolani	
George W. Macfarlane		1883–1884	House of Nobles 1884–1886; Chamberlain to Kalākaua; At Kalākaua's bedside when he died January 20, 1891	
Methuselah Mahuka		Sept 1880	Uncle of Simon Kaloa Kaʻai	
J. W. Makalena		Dec 24, 1863, Aug 20, 1864, Jan 22, 1873, Feb 23, 1884	All Privy Councils since Kamehameha V	
Lawrence McCully		1878–1891	Associate Justice of the Supreme Court of the Kingdom; Speaker of the House of Representatives	
John Moanauli		Jan 22, 1873	Privy Counselor for Lunalilo; House of Nobles 1874–1882 (died Dec 10, 1883)	
William Luther Moehonua		Feb 23, 1874	House of Nobles Apr 15, 1878; Died in office Sept 8, 1878	
Celso Caesar Moreno			Minister of the Foreign Affairs; Aug 14–19 1880	
John Mott-Smith		Apr 5, 1867 – 1874, Mar 7, 1891	All Privy Councils since Kamehameha V House of Nobles 1876–1886; Minister plenipotentiary of Hawaii to Washington, D.C.	
Paul Nahaolelua		Apr 4, 1853 – Se;pt 22, 1875	All Privy Councils since Kamehameha III; House of Nobles 1853–1874; Minister of Finance; Feb 17 – Oct 31, 1874	
David Hopeni Nahinu		1886–1891	Member of the Legislature, House of Representatives	
Paul Neumann		1883–1891	House of Nobles 1884–1892	
William Cooper Parke		Nov 2, 1874	Marshal of the Kingdom 1850–1884; Arrived in Hawaii 1843; dismissed from office by Gibson because he refused to cooperate in the corruption activities	
Samuel Parker		1883	House of Nobles 1886–1890; Major & Equerry in Waiting on Kalākaua's staff 1886	
Arthur P. Peterson			House of Nobles 1890–1893; Attorney General; June 17, 1890– Feb 25, 1891	
Edward Preston		1883	House of Nobles 1876–1882; Attorney General; July 13, 1878 – Aug 14, 1880; May 19, 1882 – May 14, 1883	
Godfrey Rhodes		Apr 5, 1867 – 1891	All Privy Councils since Kamehameha V House of Nobles 1876–1886 (b. Mar 8, 1815 – d. Sept 8, 1897); 3-time president of the Legislature; Born in England, Kauai coffee farm; 1886–1892 lived in Calif, in the room when Kalākaua died January 20, 1891	
George E. Richardson		1886–1891	House of Representatives; circuit judge of Maui	
Antone Rosa			Attorney General; Nov 15, 1886 – June 28, 1887	
William E. Rowell			Served under Samuel Gardner Wilder in the Dept. of the Interior; son of (Tenth Company) missionaries George Beckley Rowell and Malvena J. Chapin Rowell	
William James Smith		Nov 2, 1874	(b. Aug 24, 1839– d. Mar 22, 1896) Born in Tahiti. Attended the Royal School. Secretary of the Board of Education. Decorated with the Royal Order of Kalakaua, and by the Emperor of Japan with the Order of the Sacred Treasure.	
Charles Nichols Spencer			House of Nobles 1890–1892; Minister of the Interior; June 17, 1890– Sept 12, 1892	
Richard H. Stanley		1875	House of Nobles 1874; Attorney General; May 28, 1874 – Nov 5, 1875; Died in office	
Robert Stirling		1872–1874	All Privy Councils since Kamehameha V House of Nobles 1873–1874; Listed in Thrum's as still Privy Council 1889	
Lorrin Andrews Thurston			Minister of the Interior; July 1, 1887 – Sept 27, 1888; Oct 27, 1888 – June 17, 1890	
Alfred N. Tripp		1874, Aug 13, 1884 – Nov 15, 1892	Port of Honolulu harbormaster As part of Walter Murray Gibson's failed agenda for a Polynesian Confederation, Tripp was named Special Commissioner for Central and Western Polynesia. The plan called for him to use his own schooner to travel among the Gilbert Islands promoting good will among the individual chiefs.	
John Smith Walker		Oct 19, 1874 – Mar 7, 1891	House of Nobles 1876–1892; Minister of Finance; Oct 31, 1874 – Dec 5, 1876; Sept 27, 1880 – May 20, 1882; Attorney General; Nov 5, 1875 – Feb 15, 1876	
John T. Waterhouse Jr.		1887–1891	Served on Liliʻuokalani's Privy Council of State	
Henry Martyn Whitney		Jan 22, 1873 – 1891	Holdover from Lunalilo; Founder of Pacific Commercial Advertiser and Hawaiian language newspaper Ka Nupepa Kūʻokoʻa.	
Hermann A. Widemann		Feb 18, 1874 – 1891	House of Nobles 1874–1890; Justice of the Supreme Court; July 10, 1869 – Feb 18, 1874; Appointed by Kamehameha V	
Samuel Gardner Wilder		Jan 22, 1873 – 1874	Holdover from Lunalilo; House of Nobles 1874–1888; Minister of the Interior; July 3, 1878 – August 14, 1880	
William Pinehasa Wood		Nov 2, 1874 – 1890	( d. Oct 18, 1894)	

== See also ==
- Bibliography of Kalākaua
- Kalākaua's Cabinet ministers
- Liliʻuokalani's Privy Council of State

== Bibliography ==
- Dekneef, Matthew (June 10, 2016). "These are the two Hawaiian brothers who modeled for the iconic Kamehameha statue". Hawaii Magazine.
- Kuykendall, Ralph Simpson (1965) [1938]. The Hawaiian Kingdom 1778–1854, Foundation and Transformation. Vol. 1. Honolulu: University of Hawaii Press. ISBN 0-87022-431-X. OCLC 47008868.
- Kuykendall, Ralph Simpson (1967). The Hawaiian Kingdom 1874–1893, The Kalakaua Dynasty. Vol. 3. Honolulu: University of Hawaii Press. ISBN 978-0-87022-433-1. OCLC 500374815.
- Liliuokalani, Queen (1898). Hawaii's story by Hawaii's Queen, Liliuokalani. Boston, MA: Lothrop, Lee and Shepard Co. – via HathiTrust.
- Lydecker, Robert C. (1918). Rosters of Legislatures of Hawaii 1841–1918. The Honolulu Gazette Col., Ltd.

=== Thrums ===
- Thrum, Thomas G., ed. (1875). "Hawaiian Almanac and Annual for 1875". Honolulu Star-Bulletin. p. 12. hdl:10524/664.
- Thrum, Thomas G., ed. (1876). "Hawaiian Almanac and Annual for 1876". Honolulu Star-Bulletin. p. 63. hdl:10524/665.
- Thrum, Thomas G., ed. (1877). "Hawaiian Almanac and Annual for 1877". Honolulu Star-Bulletin. p. 56. hdl:10524/658.
- Thrum, Thomas G., ed. (1878). "Hawaiian Almanac and Annual for 1878". Honolulu Star-Bulletin. p. 5. hdl:10524/667.
- Thrum, Thomas G., ed. (1879). "Hawaiian Almanac and Annual for 1879". Honolulu Star-Bulletin. p. 3. hdl:10524/669.
- Thrum, Thomas G., ed. (1880). "Hawaiian Almanac and Annual for 1880". Honolulu Star-Bulletin. p. 33. hdl:10524/656.
- Thrum, Thomas G., ed. (1881). "Hawaiian Almanac and Annual for 1881". Honolulu Star-Bulletin. p. 9. hdl:10524/23168.
- Thrum, Thomas G., ed. (1882). "Hawaiian Almanac and Annual for 1882". Honolulu Star-Bulletin. p. 77. hdl:10524/23169.
- Thrum, Thomas G., ed. (1883). "Hawaiian Almanac and Annual for 1883". Honolulu Star-Bulletin. p. 74. hdl:10524/657.
- Thrum, Thomas G., ed. (1884). "Hawaiian Almanac and Annual for 1884". Honolulu Star-Bulletin. p. 76. hdl:10524/985.
- Thrum, Thomas G., ed. (1885). "Hawaiian Almanac and Annual for 1885". Honolulu Star-Bulletin. p. 84. hdl:10524/1078.
- Thrum, Thomas G., ed. (1886). "Hawaiian Almanac and Annual for 1886". Honolulu Star-Bulletin. p. 81. hdl:10524/1484.
- Thrum, Thomas G., ed. (1887). "Hawaiian Almanac and Annual for 1887". Honolulu Star-Bulletin. p. 91. hdl:10524/659.
- Thrum, Thomas G., ed. (1888). "Hawaiian Almanac and Annual for 1888". Honolulu Star-Bulletin. p. 91. hdl:10524/666.
- Thrum, Thomas G., ed. (1889). "Hawaiian Almanac and Annual for 1889". Honolulu Star-Bulletin. p. 102. hdl:10524/655.
- Thrum, Thomas G., ed. (1890). "Hawaiian Almanac and Annual for 1890". Honolulu Star-Bulletin. pp. 117–118. hdl:10524/31851.
- Thrum, Thomas G., ed. (1891). "Hawaiian Almanac and Annual for 1891". Honolulu Star-Bulletin. p. 161. hdl:10524/661.

=== Ka Huli Ao Digital Archives, Punawaiola.org ===
Minutes of the Privy Council, 1873–1892

- Hawaii. Minutes of the Privy Council, 1873–1875. Honolulu: Ka Huli Ao Center for Excellence in Native Hawaiian Law, William S. Richardson School of Law. Archived from the original on May 31, 2016.
- Hawaii. Minutes of the Privy Council, 1875–1881. Honolulu: Ka Huli Ao Center for Excellence in Native Hawaiian Law, William S. Richardson School of Law. Archived from the original on May 31, 2016.
- Hawaii. Minutes of the Privy Council, 1881–1892. Honolulu: Ka Huli Ao Center for Excellence in Native Hawaiian Law, William S. Richardson School of Law. Archived from the original on May 31, 2016.
