= Liliʻuokalani's Privy Council of State =

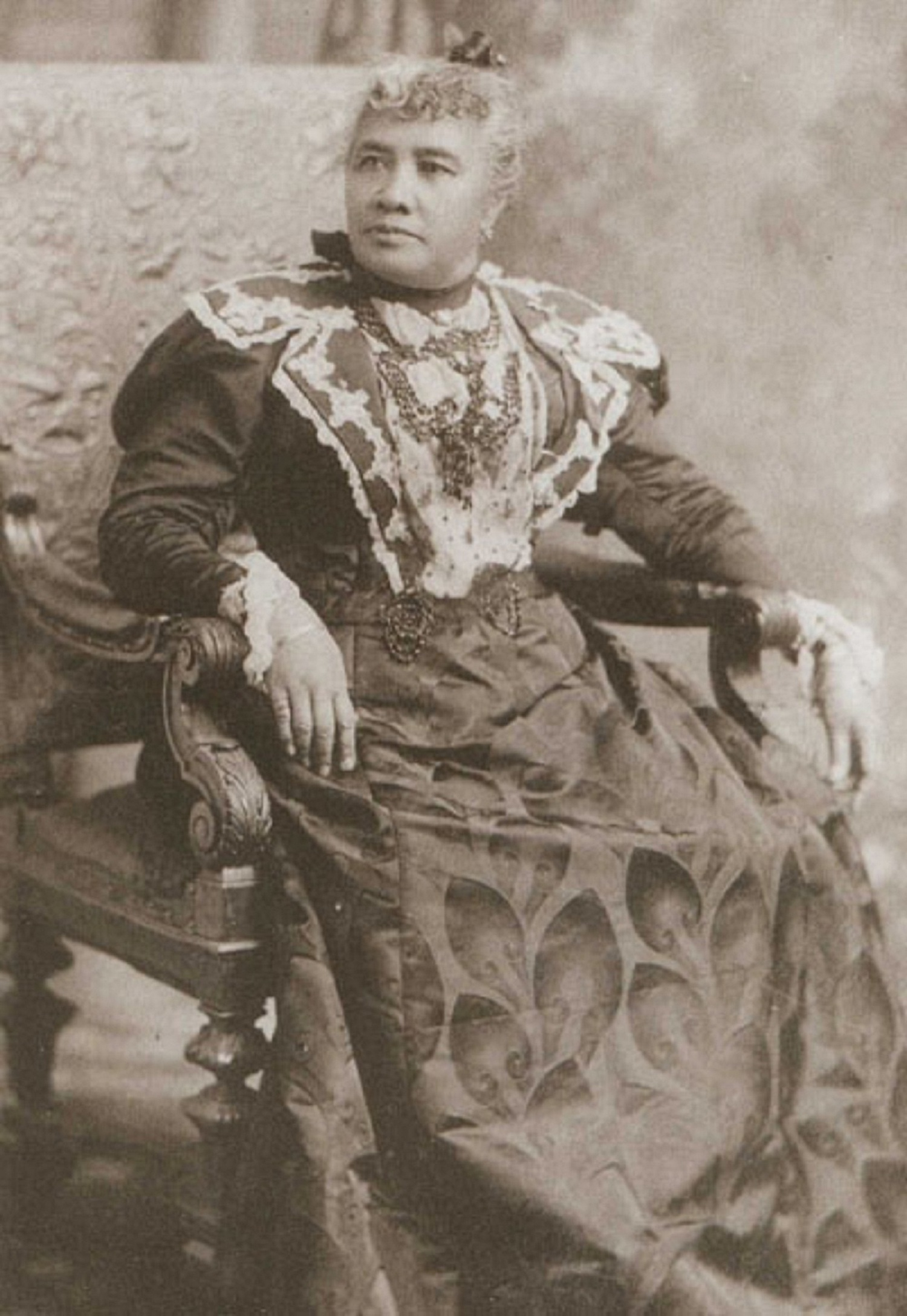
Liliʻuokalani

Following the January 20, 1891 death of King Kalākaua in San Francisco, his embalmed body arrived at Honolulu Harbor aboard the USS Charleston, draped in black with its ensigns at half mast. His sister Liliʻuokalani was designated his successor.

The Privy Council of State of the Kingdom of Hawaii was a constitutionally-created body purposed to advise and consent to acts made by the monarch. The cabinet ministers were ex-officio members. Other privy counselors were appointed by the monarch according to his (or her) personal wishes. At an emergency meeting of Kalākaua's privy council and justices of the supreme court, they were in accord that Liliʻuokalani be installed as monarch on January 29. She did not wish to discuss affairs of state during the period of mourning, but reluctantly acquiesced, and was given the oath of office by Hawaii Supreme Court Chief Justice Albert Francis Judd. Her husband John Owen Dominis was given the title of Prince Consort.

The 1887 Constitution of the Kingdom of Hawaii had made a key change in regards to the cabinet ministers. The monarch was still empowered to appoint the ministers, but only the legislature, or a voluntary resignation, could remove them from office. After her brother's funeral, the queen demanded the resignations of his ministers, causing a legal challenge when they refused. The case was decided in her favor by the Supreme Court of the kingdom. All four cabinet members submitted their resignations, and three of the four remained on her privy council.

Below is a list of 57 individuals known to have served on the queen's privy council, all citizens and subjects of the kingdom. The advisory body was composed of men who were of Native Hawaiian descent, Euro-American descent, mixed Hawaiian and Euro-American descent, and one member of Asian-Hawaiian descent. They included the insurgents who would play an eventual role in the deposition of the queen, and also the political resistance leaders who would lead the opposition to the overthrow and attempts to annex the Hawaiian Islands to the United States. The meeting dates and the roster of individuals were gleaned from the Minutes of the Privy Council, 1881–1892 and the Hawaiian Registers and Directories for 1891, 1892 and 1893, published in Thomas G. Thrum’s Hawaiian Almanac and Annual. The century-old archived records are often spotty, and should not be considered complete.

== Privy council members ==
| Name | Portrait | Meeting dates | Notes | Ref(s) |
|---|---|---|---|---|
| William DeWitt Alexander | | 1891; Jan 29, Aug 31, Dec 18 1892; Apr 21 | President of Oahu College 1864–1871, Surveyor General of the Kingdom | |
| William Fessenden Allen | | 1891; Aug 31, Dec 18 1892; Apr 21, Jul 8, Aug 31, Nov 15 | Served with the rank of colonel on the personal staffs of Kamehameha V, Lunalilo and Kalākaua. Privy Council of State under Kalākaua. | |
| Joseph Ballard Atherton | | 1891; Apr 9, Aug 31, Dec 18 1892; Jul 8, Aug 31, Nov 15 | President of Castle & Cooke, Ltd. | |
| John Tamatoa Baker | | Not present in any recorded Privy Council meetings, 1891–1892 | 1884–1891 Privy Council. Legislature of the Kingdom of Hawaii. Held the rank of Colonel on the queen's staff | |
| Robert Hoapili Baker | | Not present in any recorded Privy Council meetings, 1891–1892 | 1884–1891 Privy Council; Household Guard of Kalākaua; Member of the Legislature, House of Representatives | |
| George Charles Moʻoheau Beckley | | 1892; Jul 8 | 1891–1892 Privy Council | |
| Richard F. Bickerton | | 1891; Apr 9, Aug 31, Dec 18 1892; Apr 21, Jul 8, Aug 31, Nov 15 | 1891, Privy Council, 1878 House of Representatives; 1886–1895 Third Associate Justice of the Supreme Court | |
| Charles Reed Bishop | | 1892; Apr 21, Jul 8, Aug 31 | All Privy Councils since Kamehameha IV | |
| Cecil Brown | | 1892; Nov 15 | Attorney General; Nov, 1892 – Jan 12, 1893 | |
| Godfrey Brown | | 1891; Jan 29 | Minister of Finance; Jan 29 – Feb 25, 1891 | |
| John Edward Bush | | 1891; Jan 29 | House of Representatives 1890–1892 | |
| Joseph O. Carter | | 1891; Apr 9, Aug 31 1892; Jul 8, Aug 31, Nov 15 | 1873-1873 House of Representatives; 1891 Privy Council; Financial advisor to Liliʻuokalani | |
| Archibald Scott Cleghorn | | 1891; Jan 29, Apr 9, Dec 18 1892; Apr 21, Jul 8, Aug 31, Nov 15 | 1873–1891 Privy Council; 1891–1893 Governor of Oahu; Husband of Liliʻuokalani's sister Likelike | |
| William H. Cornwell | | 1891; Aug 31 1892; Apr 21, Jul 8, Aug 31 | Minister of Finance; November 1, 1892 – November 1, 1892 | |
| John Adams Cummins | | 1891; Jan 29, Aug 31, Dec 18 1892; Apr 21 | House of Nobles 1890–1892; Minister of Foreign Affairs; Jun 17, 1890 – Feb 25, 1891 | |
| Samuel Mills Damon | | 1891; Jan 29, Apr 9, Aug 31 1892; Apr 21, Jul 8, Aug 31 | Cabinet minister under Kalākaua | |
| Sanford B. Dole | | 1891; Dec 18 1892; Apr 21 | President of both the Provisional Government of Hawaii and the Republic of Hawaii after the overthrow of the monarchy, and later became the 1st Governor of the Territory of Hawaii | |
| John Owen Dominis | | 1891; Jan 29, Apr 9 | Prince Consort of the Hawaiian islands, husband of Liliʻuokalani; 1863–1891 Privy Council; 1864–1886 Governor of Oahu; 1878–1886 Governor of Maui, Molokai, Lanai | |
| John Ena | | 1891; Jan 29, Apr 9, Dec 18 1892; Apr 21, Aug 31 | House of Nobles 1892; Kalākaua's privy council Created the Inter-Island Steam Navigation Company in 1883, with partners Thomas R. Foster, William Foster, George Norton Wilcox and William B. Godfrey. | |
| Abraham Kaleimahoe Fernandez | | 1891; Dec 18 1892; Jul 8, Nov 15 | Business man, elder in the Church of Jesus Christ of Latter-day Saints | |
| Walter M. Giffard | | Not present in any recorded Privy Council meetings, 1891–1892 | Privy Council, Aug 5, 1891; Hawaiian Sugar Planters’ Association; Acting chancellor of the French legation; acting French commissioner and consul-general; acting consul general for Portugal | |
| Frederick H. Hayselden | | 1891; Jan 29, Apr 9 | Born in England, son-in-law of Walter Murray Gibson. Sheriff of Maui, inherited the island of Lanai from Gibson. | |
| John Green Hoapili | | 1891; Apr 9, Aug 31 1892; Jul 8, Aug 31, Nov 15 | House of Nobles 1891–1892 | |
| Curtis P. Iaukea | | 1891; Aug 31, Dec 18 1892; Apr 21, Jul 8, Aug 31, Nov 15 | Career diplomat, office holder, and military officer for the Kingdom, Provisional Government, and Territory of Hawaii | |
| William G. Irwin | | 1891; Jan 29, Aug 31 1892; Apr 21, Jul 8, Aug 31, Nov 15 | 1887 Privy Council under Kalākaua; Business and investment banking partner of Claus Spreckels and former California governor F. F. Low. DBA as Claus Spreckels & Co, the partnership circulated the Kalākaua coinage in Hawaii and floated loans to the monarchy/government. Irwin was also a partner of Samuel Gardner Wilder in the steamship business. | |
| Paul Isenberg Jr. | | 1891; Aug 31 | aka Daniel Paul Rice Isenberg aka D. P. R. Isenberg 1903–1905 president Territorial Senate; 1913–1915 Territorial House of Representatives son of Paul Isenberg of Amfac | |
| Peter Cushman Jones | | 1892; Nov 15 | Minister of Finance; Nov 8, 1892 – Jan 12, 1893 | |
| Albert Francis Judd | | 1891; Jan 29, Apr 9, Aug 31, Dec 18 1892; Apr 21, Jul 8, Nov 15 | Chief Justice Supreme Court of Hawaii; Cabinet minister under Kalākaua; Attorney General | |
| Junius Kaʻae | | 1891; Jan 29, Apr 9, Aug 31, Dec 18 | Member of the Legislature, House of Nobles 1882–86; Registrar of Conveyances 1886–87; Privy Council 1883 | |
| David Kahanu | | 1891; Jan 29, Apr 9, Aug 31, Dec 18 1892; Apr 21, Jul 8 | 1877 appointed to Private Ways & Water Rights. Appointed to Kalākaua's Privy Council June 25, 1879, and appointed to Liliʻuokalani's Privy Council on March 7, 1891. | |
| Paul P. Kanoa | | Not present in any recorded Privy Council meetings, 1891–1892 | Cabinet minister under Kalākaua; Minister of Finance | |
| John Lot Kaulukoʻu | | 1891; Jan 29 | Cabinet minister under Kalākaua; Attorney General | |
| John K. Kaunamano | | 1892; Jul 8, Nov 15 | Member of the Legislature, House of Nobles | |
| David Kawānanakoa | | 1891; Aug 31, Dec 18 1892; Apr 21, Jul 8, Nov 15 | House of Kalākaua, third in line to the throne | |
| Edward Kamakau Lilikalani | | 1891; Apr 9, Aug 31, Dec 18 1892; Apr 21, Jul 8, Aug 31, Nov 15 | 1883 Privy Council; 1889 Capt. King's Staff; 1890, 1st Lt. King's Guards; 1892, Col. Queen's Staff; Royal Order of Oceania, Order of Oceania, Order of Kalakaua, Order of Kapiolani | |
| Lawrence McCully | | 1891; Jan 29, Apr 9 | 1858–1859 Member of the Legislature, House of Representatives; 1860 Senate; 1878–1891 Privy Council; 1877–1892; Associate Justice of the Supreme Court | |
| John Mott-Smith | | 1891; Aug 31 | Minister of Finance; July 28 – Oct 17, 1891 | |
| David Hopeni Nahinu | | Not present in any recorded Privy Council meetings, 1891–1892 | Member of the Legislature, House of Representatives | |
| Paul Neumann | | 1891; Apr 9, Aug 31 1892; Apr 21, Jul 8, Aug 31 | Attorney General; Aug 29–30, 1892; Sept 12 – Oct 17, 1892; Acted as the queen's personal attorney after the overthrow. | |
| Samuel Parker | | 1891; Jan 29, Apr 9, Aug 31, Dec 18 1892; Apr 21, Jul 8, Aug 31, Nov 15 | Minister of Finance (acting); Mar 10 – June 28, 1891; Oct 17, 1891 – Jan 28 1892; Minister of Foreign Affairs; Feb 25, 1891– Nov 1, 1892; Jan 13–17, 1893 | |
| Franklin Seaver Pratt | | 1891; Apr 9 1892; Apr 21, Jul 8, Nov 18 | Consul-General in San Francisco | |
| Godfrey Rhodes | | Not present in any recorded Privy Council meetings, 1891–1892 | Member of the Legislature, House of Nobles, President of the Legislative Assembly | |
| George E. Richardson | | Not present in any recorded Privy Council meetings, 1891–1892 | George Edward Kekuihapo Richardson. Judge of the Second Judicial Circuit | |
| John Richardson | | 1891; Aug 31, Dec 18 1892; Apr 21, Jul 8, Aug 31 | Member of the Legislature, House of Representatives 1884, House of Nobles 1887-8. Part of the native Hawaiian commission that submitted the Kūʻē Petitions protesting annexation by the United States. Son of Circuit Judge John Richardson | |
| James W. Robertson | | 1892; July 8 | 1888 Vice Chamberlain; 1881 Chamberlain; 1891 Major on staff of Gov. of Oahu; 1892 Privy Council | |
| Mark Prever Robinson | | 1892; Apr 21, Aug 3, Nov 15 | Minister of Foreign Affairs; Nov 8, 1892 – Jan 12, 1893 | |
| Antone Rosa | | 1891; Apr 9, Aug 31, Dec 18 1892; Apr 21, Aug 31 | Cabinet minister under Kalākaua; Attorney General | |
| William E. Rowell | | 1891; Jan 29 | 1884 Member of the Legislature, House of Representatives; 1887 Privy Council | |
| William James Smith | | 1891; Jan 29, Apr 9 1892; Apr 21, Nov 15 | Born in Tahiti, attended the Royal School (was he on the 1881 world trip?), decorated with the Royal Order of Kalākaua, and by the Emperor of Japan with the Order of the Sacred Treasure | |
| Charles Nichols Spencer | | 1891; Jan 29, Apr 9, Aug 31, Dec 18 1892; Apr 21, Jul 8, Aug 31 | Minister of the Interior; Jun 17, 1890 – Sept 12, 1892 | |
| Alfred N. Tripp | | 1891; Jan 29, Apr 9, Aug 31, Dec 18 1892; Apr 21, Jul 8, Aug 31, Nov 15 | Privy Council 1874, Aug 13, 1884 – Nov 15, 1892; Honolulu Harbor master Jul 28, 1883 Special Commissioner for Central and Western Polynesia. | |
| John Smith Walker | | 1891; Jan 29, Apr 9, Aug 31 1892; Apr 21, Jul 8, Aug 31, Nov 15 | Cabinet minister under Kalākaua; Attorney General; Minister of Finance | |
| John T. Waterhouse Jr. | | 1891; Jan 29-Mar 7 | Served on Kalākaua's Privy Council of State from Sept 19, 1887 | |
| Henry Martyn Whitney | | 1891; Jan 29, Apr 9, Aug 31, Dec 18 1892; Jul 8, Aug 31, Nov 15 | Founder of Pacific Commercial Advertiser and Hawaiian language newspaper Ka Nupepa Kūʻokoʻa. | |
| Hermann A. Widemann | | 1891; Apr 9, Dec 18 1892; Apr 21, Jul 8, Aug 31 | Minister of Finance; Feb 25 – Mar 10,1891; Jul 28 – Sept 12, 1892; Justice of the Supreme Court; July 10, 1869 – Feb 18, 1874; Appointed by Kamehameha V | |
| George Norton Wilcox | | 1892; Apr 21, Nov 15 | Minister of the Interior; Nov 8, 1892 – Jan 12, 1893 | |
| Charles Burnett Wilson | | 1891; Aug 31, Dec 18 1892; Apr 21, Nov 15 | Fire chief under King Kalākaua, 1891 Privy Council, Marshal of the Kingdom under Queen Liliʻuokalani. Father of Honolulu Mayor John H. Wilson. | |

== See also ==
- Liliʻuokalani's Cabinet ministers
- Kalākaua's Privy Council of State
- 1892 legislative session of the Hawaiian Kingdom
- MOS Hawaii-related articles

== Bibliography ==
- Kuykendall, Ralph Simpson (1965) [1938]. The Hawaiian Kingdom 1778–1854, Foundation and Transformation. Vol. 1. Honolulu: University of Hawaii Press. ISBN 0-87022-431-X. OCLC 47008868.
- Kuykendall, Ralph Simpson (1967). The Hawaiian Kingdom 1874–1893, The Kalakaua Dynasty. Vol. 3. Honolulu: University of Hawaii Press. ISBN 978-0-87022-433-1. OCLC 500374815.
- Lydecker, Robert C. (1918). Rosters of Legislatures of Hawaii 1841–1918. The Honolulu Gazette Col., Ltd.
- Liliuokalani, Queen (1898). Hawaii's story by Hawaii's Queen, Liliuokalani. Boston, MA: Lothrop, Lee and Shepard Co. – via HathiTrust.
- "By Authority". The Pacific Commercial Advertiser. Honolulu. March 17, 1891. p. 2.
- "Privy Council of State office record" (PDF). state archives digital collections. state of Hawaii.
