= Hale Nauā Society =

The Hale Nauā was a secret society that had existed among Hawaii's ruling class before the 1778 arrival of Captain James Cook. Believed to have originally been an organization to unite the Hawaiian aristocracy, it gradually disappeared as the influx of outside cultures changed the dynamics of the island kingdom. Kalākaua revived the Hale Nauā, purposed with educating and developing knowledge of modern sciences, art, and literature among native Hawaiians. His incarnation of the society ended with his 1891 death. In the 1970s, Rocky Jensen and other artists formed Hale Nauā III to promote Hawaii's culture through the creative arts.

== Prologue ==
The foundation of the Hale Nauā is from the beginning of the world and the revival of the Order was selected and the base levelled [sic], the outer and inner pillars erected, the beams and scantling attached, the rafters bound with cord, the roof plated and thatched, the erection of the Iku Hai's mansion completed in the month of Welo (September), on the night of Kāne, in the reign of His Majesty Kalākaua I., the 825th generation from Lailai, or 24,750 years from the Wohi Kumulipo (the beginning), and Kapomanomano (the producing agent), equivalent to 40,000,000,000,024,750 years from the commencement of the world and 24,750 years from Lailai, the first woman, dating to the date of the present calendar, the 24th of September, a.d. 1886.

— "Preamble to the Constitution of the Hale Nauā", Aloha Betrayed: Native Hawaiian Resistance to American Colonialism

Hale is the Hawaiian word for "house", but "nauā" has been up for interpretation. Historian Nathaniel Bright Emerson's translations of native Hawaiian (and Christian minister) David Malo's writings led him to believe Malo's conclusions about membership were in error. Malo had stated that the original Hale Nauā was an organization to promote peaceful relations among leaders, with membership requirements that were non-discriminatory by social position. Emerson believed that "nauā" was a challenge question for membership candidates, something along the lines of, "Whose house do you belong to?" At that point, the candidate would be required to recite their ancestry for consideration of membership. Based on a criterion of lineage, Emerson concluded that membership was open only to the ruling class.

== Cultural drift ==
King Kalākaua's motto was "Hoʻoulu Lāhui", translated as "to increase, restore, re-establish and advance the lāhui or people." Diseases brought to Hawaii by outsiders had decreased the native Hawaiian population from 300,000 in 1778, when Captain James Cook became the first European in the islands, to 49,944 in 1872. The influx of foreigners to the kingdom also brought a more diverse influence on daily life. Hawaiians intermarried with non-Hawaiians, and missionaries supplanted the native beliefs with their own ethos. By the mid-19th century, non-Hawaiians constituted an overwhelming majority in the legislature. The Alien Land Ownership Act of 1850 allowed foreigners to hold title to Hawaiian land. Many Native Hawaiians were disenfranchised by legislation that made property ownership a qualification for voting, and most of the property owners were either Hawaiian nobility/gentry or non-Hawaiian sugar plantation owners. At the end of the rule of Kamehameha dynasty, the 1864 Constitution of the Hawaiian Kingdom provided for legislative elections to select the monarch.

== Fraternal organizations in Hawaii ==
Kalākaua was well-versed in the role that fraternal organizations played in leadership skills, as well as their political connections as an international power base. He joined the all-male freemasonry Lodge Le Progrès de L'Océanie at age 21, and was not the first in the royal line to do so. Both Kamehameha IV and Kamehameha V had been members. During his 1874–75 state visit to secure a reciprocity treaty, he was a guest at lodges in multiple United States cities. On his 1881 world tour to negotiate labor contracts, he was feted at masonry lodges in Hong Kong, Singapore, Egypt and Edinburgh, Scotland. When the construction of Iolani Palace was completed in 1882, the king opened it to the Lodge Le Progrès de L'Océanie (The Progress of Oceania) for masonry activities.

The High Court of the Ancient Order of Foresters in Sheffield, England granted authorization on July 17, 1879, for Kalākaua to establish the Ancient Order of Foresters in Hawaii. These organizations, along with the Odd Fellows and Knights of Pythias, were active in Hawaii during Kalākaua's lifetime. All of them were centered around a white male culture that excluded women from their memberships.

== Kalākaua's vision ==
Before he was elected king, Kalākaua had been using his resources to educate native Hawaiians. Historian Noenoe Silva has described Kalākaua's reign as a balancing between accommodating the non-Hawaiian power brokers in Hawaii, and a continuance of native Hawaiian resistance. The king was a financial backer of the Hawaiian-language newspapers, Ka Hoku o ka Pakipika (The Star of the Pacific) and Kamanawa (The Times) under the reign of Kamehameha IV, and Ka Hoku o Ke Kai (The Star of the Sea) journal during his own reign. Within days of ascending to the throne, he and his family set out to give Hawaii's under-privileged residents a helping hand. His sister Princess Likelike organized the Hui Ho'oulu a Ho'ola Lahui of Kalākaua at Kawaiahaʻo Church, with an initial 51 members. It functioned as a charity organization, to care for the kingdom's ill, financially destitute, or those otherwise in need of assistance. Kalākaua took Hawaiian candidates for public office under his wing, and in 1886, revived the Hale Nauā with a structure to promote pride in the Hawaiian culture while gaining skills and knowledge for leadership positions.

== The House of Wisdom and the Temple of Science ==
Hawaii's history from its beginnings up through Kalākaua's reign, as told through the genealogical chant known as the Kumulipo, documents that women were central to the Hawaiian narrative of creation, and held respected positions of power. In contrast, was Liliʻuokalani's account of what happened when the king named her as heir-apparent to act as regent during his 1881 world tour. She later wrote that the legislature insisted she only oversee a temporary council which would, in turn, make the royal decisions for her. She refused to acquiesce to their terms, and the legislature backed down, agreeing to her acting as regent over the government during the king's absence.

During the 1880 session of the Legislature of the Hawaiian Kingdom, the king's political ally Walter Murray Gibson aided in pushing through legislative authorization to create the Board of Genealogy of the Hawaiian Chiefs (Papa Kuauhau Alii o Na Alii Hawaii). Kalākaua's sister-in-law Princess Poʻomaikelani was named as its president, and the Kumulipo, based on 128 meles, was the direct result of the board's work.

On September 20, 1886, Kalākaua and Queen Kapi'olani met with a small committee to revive the Hale Nauā to promote the advancement of the Hawaiian race. Among those in attendance were high chiefess Ululani Lewai Baker and her husband John Tamatoa Baker, Annie Maikai, Mrs. Hannah Kinimaka, Mrs. Hannah Lilikalani, Grace Kahalewai, Mrs. K. Makua, Mrs. M. Kaahu, Mrs. M. Kawelo, and Mrs. K. Keaweluaole. On November 6, 1886, Kalākaua's Privy Council of State approved the license for reviving it under the name Hale Nauā Society.

This incarnation of the society was geared towards Hawaiian-ancestry membership, with activities in the Hawaiian language. In contrast to the supposed purpose of the original Hale Nauā, this one was known as the "House of Wisdom", and the "Temple of Science". The legislature of 1887 abolished funding for the Board of Genealogy of the Hawaiian Chiefs. Princess Poʻomaikelani was elected president of the Hale Nauā that year, and continued her genealogical work that had been aborted by the legislature.

The organization was purposed with perpetuating Hawaiian culture through science, art and literature. Scientific study included through the Hale Nauā was that which directly related to Hawaii and its environment. Kalākaua's cabinet minister William Lowthian Green had published many papers on his scientific observations of the volcanology of the islands. Combined with existing deep-sea maps and other published evidence, Hawaiian concepts presented a more complete study with which to encourage the United States to continue and extend research into the scientific forces that created the islands. Cosmological tables of the universe were produced which listed both the Hawaiian and English names, as they were known as at that time. Astrological divination was conducted in the manner of the kahuna.

== Death of Kalākaua ==
The Hale Nauā Society ceased its existence upon Kalākaua's death in 1891. During its time, it had combined both Hawaiian and western knowledge to further enhance the Hawaiian culture. The society was limited to native Hawaiians, and exceeded 200 in a membership that included many who were in government positions or sat on advisory councils. They provided Hawaiian artifacts and craft work to international expositions. Members wore Hawaiian feather cloaks and promoted Hawaiian unity. The non-Hawaiian society that was largely excluded from the proceedings, reacted with innuendos and misinformation about that which they had no first-hand knowledge. Rumors labeled it "The Ball of Twine Society", which referred to a game of sexual activity.

In 2004, the National Museum of Natural History displayed Kalākaua's red-and-yellow feathered Hale Naua ʻahuʻula and feathered kāhili as part of its Hawaiian special exhibit.

== Hale Nauā III ==
Hale Nauā III is a society founded in the 1970s by Rocky Ka'iouliokahikikolo'ehu Jensen and other visionaries, to promote Hawaii's culture through the creative arts. The Bishop Museum hosted the group's first exhibition and included artists: Rocky KaʻiouliokahihikoloʻEhu Jensen, Phillip G. Naone, Duncan K . Sato, Joseph Momoa, Ipo Nihipali, Joseph Dowson, David Paul Parker, Dutch Mossman, Clayton Au, and Imaikalani Kalahele. The exhibition ran from September 1978 to January 1979. Rocky is the brother of entertainer Dick Jensen.

== Bibliography ==
- "The Hale Nauā Society". The Hawaiian Gazette. February 12, 1889. p. 8, col. 1.
- Hui hooulu a hoola lahui of Kalakaua I, Kawaiahao (1888). Constitution & by-laws of the Ahahui hooulu a hoola society. Organized February 19, 1874. Daily bulletin steam printing office. p. 22.
- Kaeppler, Adrienne Lois (2008). The Pacific Arts of Polynesia and Micronesia. OUP Oxford. ISBN 978-0-19-284238-1. OCLC 458758977.
- Kamehiro, Stacy L. (2009). The Arts of Kingship: Hawaiian Art and National Culture of the Kalākaua Era. University of Hawaii Press. p. 19. ISBN 978-0-8248-3263-6.
- Karpiel, Frank (1999). "Notes & Queries – The Hale Nauā Society". The Hawaiian Journal of History. 33. Honolulu: Hawaiian Historical Society: 203–212. hdl:10524/509. OCLC 60626541.
- MacLennan, Carol A. (2014). Sovereign Sugar: Industry and Environment in Hawaii. University of Hawaiʻi Press. ISBN 978-0-8248-4024-2. - Available at Project MUSE
- Karpiel, Frank J. Jr. (August 2000). "Mystic Ties of Brotherhood: Freemasonry, Ritual, and Hawaiian Royalty in the Nineteenth Century". Pacific Historical Review. 69 (3). University of California Press: 357–397. doi:10.2307/3641714. JSTOR 3641714.
- Kuykendall, Ralph Simpson (1953). The Hawaiian Kingdom 1854–1874, Twenty Critical Years. Vol. 2. Honolulu: University of Hawaii Press. ISBN 978-0-87022-432-4. OCLC 47010821.
- Kuykendall, Ralph Simpson (1967). The Hawaiian Kingdom 1874–1893, The Kalakaua Dynasty. Vol. 3. Honolulu: University of Hawaii Press. ISBN 978-0-87022-433-1. OCLC 500374815.
- Liliʻuokalani, Queen (1898). Hawaii's story by Hawaii's Queen, Liliʻuokalani. Boston, MA: Lothrop, Lee and Shepard Co. – via HathiTrust.
- Malo, Davida; Emerson, Nathaniel Bright (1903). Hawaiian antiquities: (Moolelo Hawaii). Bernice Pauahi Bishop Museum / Special publication; 2. Hawaiian Gazette Co., Ltd. pp=254, 263, 264
- Menton, Linda K.; Tamura, Eileen (1999). A History of Hawaii, Student Book. University of Hawaii at Manoa. ISBN 978-0-937049-94-5.
- Silva, Noenoe K. (2004). "The Merrie Monarch: Genealogy, cosmology, mele, and performance art as resistance". In Joseph, Gilbert M.; Rosenberg, Emily S. (eds.). Aloha Betrayed: Native Hawaiian Resistance to American Colonialism. Durham: Duke University Press. ISBN 0-8223-8622-4. OCLC 191222123 – via ProjectMuse.
- Van Dyke, Jon M. (2008). Who Owns the Crown Lands of Hawaiʻi?. Honolulu: University of Hawaii Press. ISBN 978-0-8248-6560-3. OCLC 257449971 – via Project MUSE.
