= Death and state funerals of Kalākaua =

1891 funerals in California and Hawaii

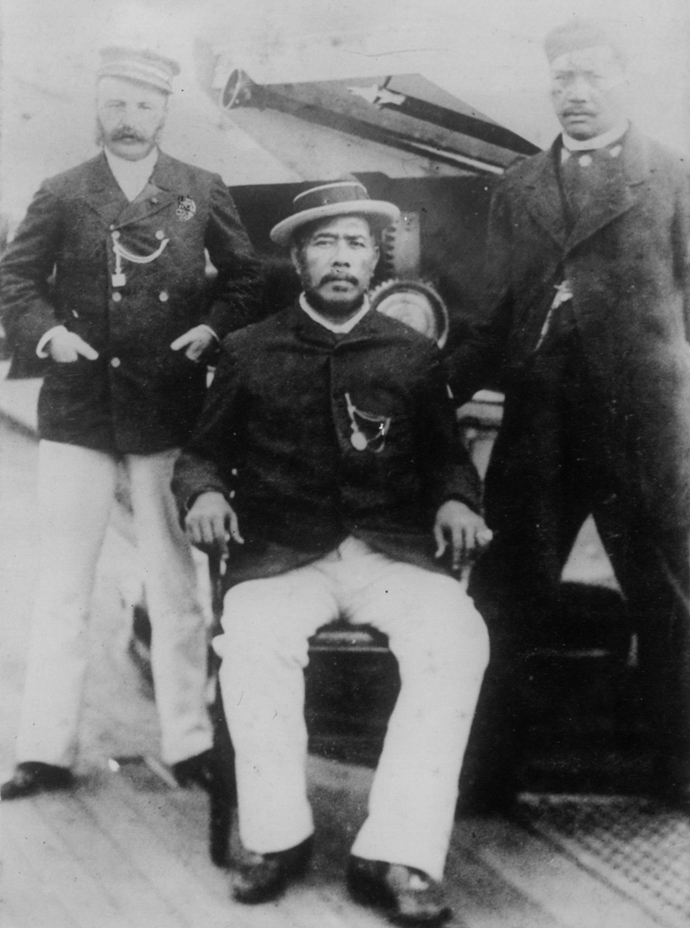
Aboard the USS Charleston (C-2): (left to right) Colonel G. W. Macfarlane, King Kalakaua, and Colonel R. H. Baker.

Kalākaua, the last king of Hawaii, died on January 20, 1891, while visiting in California. President Benjamin Harrison ordered the United States Navy and United States Army to conduct a state funeral in San Francisco. The funeral attracted an estimated 100,000 spectators who lined the streets to watch the cortege pass. When the United States military escorted his body back to Honolulu, no one knew Kalākaua had died. The homecoming celebration that Honolulu had been planning for their monarch was replaced by funeral preparations. He received a second state funeral in the throne room of Iolani Palace, entirely in the Hawaiian language, and was laid to rest at the Royal Mausoleum of Hawaii. News reports stated that the Honolulu funeral cortege was so massive it took 75 minutes for its entirety to pass any given point.

== Death ==
King Kalākaua, the last king of Hawaii, sailed for California aboard the USS Charleston on November 25, 1890. Accompanying him were his friends George W. Macfarlane and Robert Hoapili Baker. The account given by his sister and heir-apparent Liliuokalani is that he told her on November 22 that he intended to travel to Washington, D.C. to discuss the McKinley Tariff. She had been bedridden three weeks with her own health issues, was already aware he was suffering from ill health, and begged him not to go. In his absence, she once again was named Princess Regent as she had been during Kalākaua's 1881 world tour.

The king checked into the Palace Hotel on December 5. During the next month in California, he met with Hawaii's Minister to the United States Henry A. P. Carter, and traveled up and down the coast visiting with friends. On January 5, 1891, he suffered a stroke while visiting the olive ranch of Ellwood Cooper outside Santa Barbara, and returned to San Francisco. Kalākaua fell into a coma in his suite on January 18. He died on January 20, surrounded by Macfarlane, Baker, Claus Spreckels, Reverend and Mrs. J. Sanders Reed. Admiral George Brown, Charles Reed Bishop, his handmaiden Kalua, and his valet Kahikina, Mrs. Swan, Consul and Mrs. David Allison McKinley, and Dr. George W. Woods, surgeon of the United States Pacific fleet, Lieut. Dyer, Godfrey Rhodes, Judge Hart, Senator George E. Whitney, Mrs. Price. The cause of death, as listed by US Navy officials, was that the king had died from Bright's Disease (inflammation of the kidneys).

Newspapers in the United States were announcing it by the next day. The Evening Star in Washington D. C. ran a 4-column coverage on his death, and a recap of his reign. He subsequently received two state funerals, one in San Francisco and the second in Honolulu. The news of his death would not be known in Hawaii until his body arrived on January 29.

== Funeral in San Francisco (January 22) ==
Kalākaua's body was embalmed at the mortuary of Trinity Episcopal Church in San Francisco, where he lay in state. Acting on behalf of President Benjamin Harrison, the United States Navy and United States Army assumed full responsibility for funeral arrangements, including guarding the casket inside the church. He was to be accorded full military honors, and the military was given charge of transporting the body back to Hawaii.

On January 22, the day of the funeral, all federal, state and municipal government offices closed, as did many San Francisco businesses. General John Gibbon oversaw security, and San Francisco police were brought in to handle the hordes of people who jammed the area around the church in hopes of being allowed inside. San Francisco Mayor George Henry Sanderson was in charge of arranging the invitations and requested that attendees meet at the Palace Hotel and travel in groups to the services by carriage. Attendees responding to Sanderson's invitation were heads of commerce, trade organizations, foreign and domestic government representatives of all levels, trade unions, the court system on all levels, and representatives of civic, fraternal and social organizations.

Rev. E. B. Spaulding, rector of St. John's Episcopal Church read from 1 Corinthians 15:20–55. "But now is Christ risen from the dead, and become the firstfruits of them that slept." Rev. J. Sanders Reed conducted the services. At the end of the clergy messages, the choir sang the hymn "Rock of Ages".

In order to allow the funeral cortege to pass, police cleared a path through the streets, as an estimated 100,000 spectators gathered on the sides. The Fourth United States Cavalry and the Fifth United States Artillery led the cortege. Approximately 1,600 military men participated, including the First Infantry, Fifth Infantry, Fourth United States Cavalry, Light Battery F of the United States Artillery. The local Knights Templar fraternal organization drove the hearse, while funeral attendees followed in 38 carriages. At the water-front, the casket was transferred to the lighthouse steamer Madrona, which shuttled it to the USS Charleston. Gun salutes rang out from the Presidio of San Francisco and Alcatraz Island, as the USS Charleston sailed out towards Hawaii.

== Lying in state and funeral in Honolulu (January 29 – February 15) ==
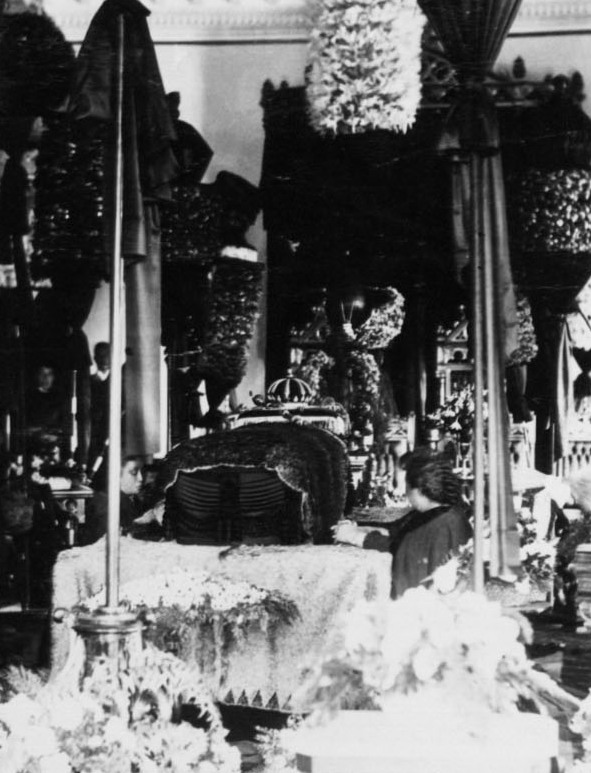
Kalākaua lying in state

On January 29, Hawaii was busy making preparations for a celebratory return of their king when the USS Charleston arrived at Honolulu Harbor, draped in black with its flags at half mast. It was the first news Hawaii had of Kalākaua's death. An emergency meeting was held of the Privy Council of State, cabinet ministers and justices of the supreme court, and agreed it was imperative that Liliuokalani be installed as monarch immediately. Overwhelmed with grief, she reluctantly acquiesced to their demands and was given the oath of office by Hawaii Supreme Court Chief Justice Albert Francis Judd.

At 5 p.m., the casket was transferred to a hearse and, accompanied by US Marines and British Bluejackets, was taken to Iolani Palace for a two-week period of lying in state. Inside the throne room, the casket was placed on top of Nāhiʻenaʻena's Pāʻū, a feathered cloak that had been worn by Kamehameha III's sister Nāhiʻenaʻena, with another feathered cloak draped across the top. Liliuokalani described the twenty-four Kahili bearers who stood watch in rotating shifts as men descended from Hawaiian royalty. While standing watch, they sang either the traditional meles and chants specific to the family of the deceased, or composed their own. The Pacific Commercial Advertiser reported, "Not the least among the attractions to the Palace during the past two weeks was the singing by the native choirs in Iolani Palace, in the evenings, often till after midnight. The songs were mostly recent compositions in honor of the late King, and were sung either by a full choir of twenty or more voices, or as solos with a chorus from the choir."

The funeral service was held at 11 a. m. in the throne room of Iolani Palace on February 15. Admission was by printed invitation only. The royal family sat at the head of the casket, and Kalākaua's cabinet ministers sat at the foot of the casket. The entire service and its music were conducted in the Hawaiian language. As with the service that had been held in San Francisco, the clergy reading was 1 Corinthians 15:20–55. Liliuokalani composed her own chant for the choirs, based on Psalm 90. In her memoirs, she made note of her fascination of the women of the Hale Naua secret society and their prayer rituals over the body of Kalākaua. The King had inducted women into the society as equal members for the first time in Hawaiian history.

The state funeral cost the Hawaiian government a total of $21,442 including $1,200 for the koa and kou casket.

== Cortege to Royal Mausoleum ==
Exact head counts are not available, but The Daily Bulletin reported that the cortege (procession) was so lengthy it took 75 minutes for the entirety of it to make its way past any one point along the route. As it wound through the city, church bells rang out across Honolulu, bonfires were visible at Punchbowl Crater, gun salutes were fired from both Punchbowl and from American ships in the harbor. At the Royal Mausoleum of Hawaii there were more religious services and choir singing, followed by a service conducted by the Freemasons. Kalākaua was laid to rest in the main Royal Mausoleum building and later transferred to the underground Kalākaua Crypt in 1910.

Below is the order of procession printed in the newspaper. Other accounts provide details of individuals in the cortege but are not exact in which grouping they belong, if any.

- Undertaker H. H. Williams
- Mounted Torch Bearers
- Police (est. 50)
- Marshal of the Kingdom and aides
- St. Louis College Band
- Students of St. Louis College (150 pupils)
- Kamehameha School (100 pupils)
- Iolani College
- Public Schools
- Kawaiahao Female Seminary
- St. Andrew's Priory School
- Oahu College
- Band
- Portuguese Societies
- Honolulu Fire Department
- Mechanics' Benefit Union
- Ancient Order of Foresters
- American Legion of Honor
- Knights of Pythias
- Geo. W. De Long Post, No. 45, G. A. R. Independent Order of Odd Fellows
- Representatives of the Masonic Veteran Association of the Pacific Coast
- Free and Accepted Masons
- Members of the Medical Fraternity
- Attending physicians to the late King
- Ahahui Opiopio Puuwai Lukahi
- Liliuokalani Educational Society
- Hoola and Hooulu Lahui Society (400 members)
- Lei Mamo Society
- Hale Naua Society
- Konohikis (Note: kono.hiki n. "Headman of an ahupuaʻa land division under the chief; land or fishing rights under control of the konohiki; such rights are sometimes called konohiki rights." (PPN tongafiti.)) of Crown Lands
- Konohikis of Her Majesty's Private Lands
- Konohikis of the late King's Private Lands
- Colonel Commanding and Staff
- Royal Hawaiian Band
- Band of the U. S. F. S. Charleston
- Detachment of Marines and Blue Jackets from the U. S. Flagship Charleston
- U. S. S. Mohican
- H. B. M. S. Nymphe
- King's Guards
- Her Majesty's Household Servants
- Servants of the late King
- Protestant Clergy
- Clergy of the Roman Catholic Church
- Right Reverend Herman Koeckemann, the Bishop of Olba
- Choir
- Officiating Clergy
- Right Reverend Alfred Willis, the Anglican Bishop of Honolulu
- The Late King's Charger led by two coachmen
- George W. Macfarlane, His Late Majesty's Chamberlains
- Four torch bearers, carrying the "kukuiaikeawakea," torches, symbolic of the late King's ancestors
- The Honorable Majors Robert Hoapili Baker and John Timoteo Baker bearing the Crown Jewels
- The Native Sons of Hawaii (over 100 men) bearing the Catafalque
- Maids of Honor carrying leis

Miss R. Nowlein, Misses Edith and Maude Auld, Miss McGuire, Miss Annie Holmes, Misses Mary and Lizzie Leleo, Miss Fanny Markham, Miss Cummins, Miss Elizabeth Hoapila

- Large and small kahili bearers (95)
- Catafalque and Pall bearers

J. O. Carter, Justice R. F. Bickerton, H. J. Nolte, H. W.Severance, Hon. Paul P. Kanoa, Hon. Samuel Parker, His Ex. J. A. Cummins, His Ex. C. N. Spencer, Gideon West, Hon. H. A. Widemann, Kapabuilima, Kamakahukilani, A. P. Palekaluhi, J. G. Hoapili, Laanui, Mekuiapoiwa, Mauleule and William H. Tell.

- Royal Carriage with Her Majesty Queen Dowager Kapiolani and HRH Princess Poomaikelani
- The State Carriage with Her Majesty Queen Liliuokalani and His Excellency the Honorable John Owen Dominis, Consort
- Carriage of HRH Princess Kaiulani, bearing the Honorable Archibald Scott Cleghorn
- Chief Justice Albert Francis Judd, the Chancellor of the Kingdom
- The Cabinet Ministers

John A. Cummins, Godfrey Brown, A. P. Peterson

- The Diplomatic Corps and Rear Admiral Brown and Staff
- Justices of the Supreme Court
- John Smith Walker, President of the Legislature
- Members of the Legislature
- The Ladies of the Court
- The Privy Councilors
- Officers of the U. S. Flagship Charleston, U. S. S. Mohican and H. B. M. S. Nymphe
- Counselor Corps
- Circuit Judges
- Members of the Bar
- Government Officials
- Foreign Residents
- The Public
- Police

== Gallery ==
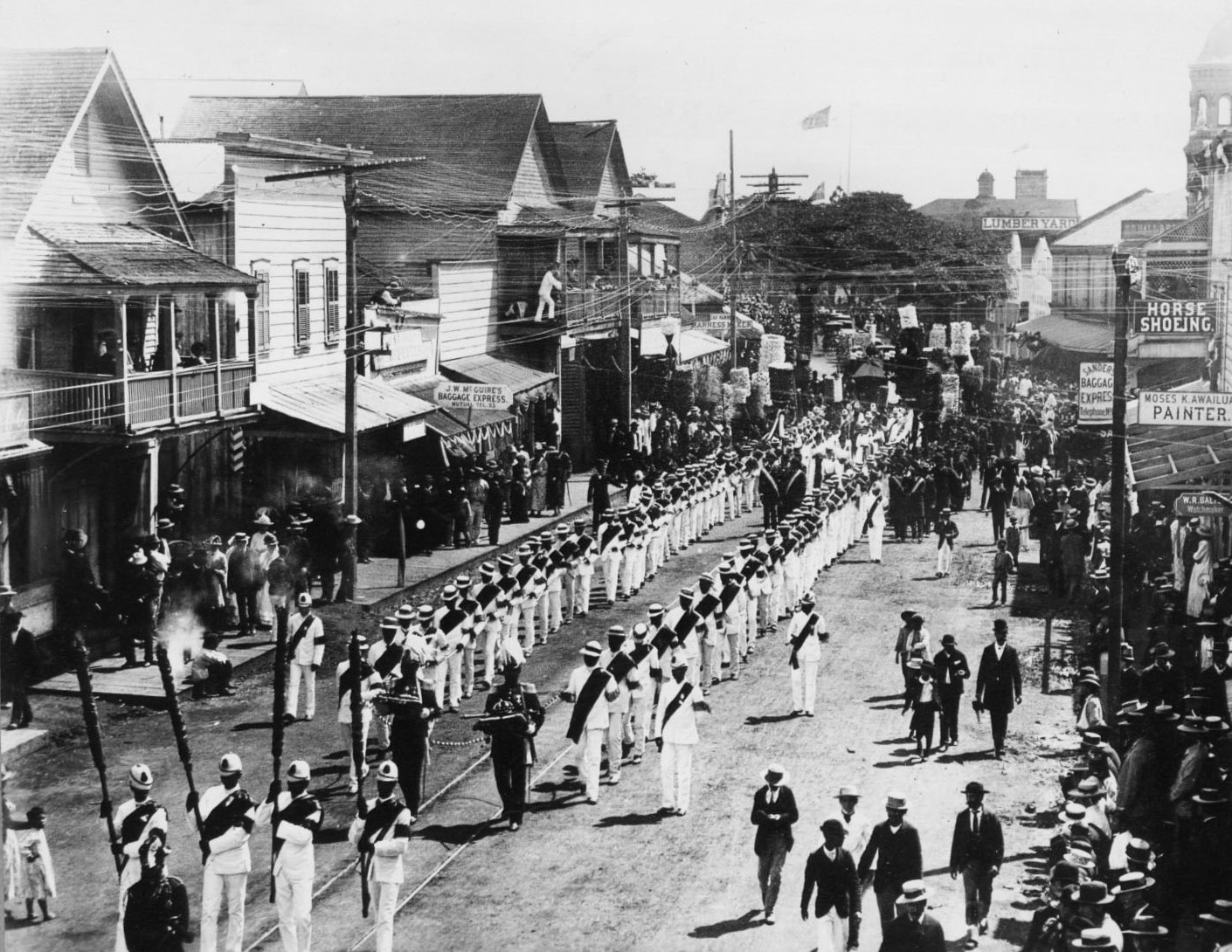
Funeral procession of Kalakaua

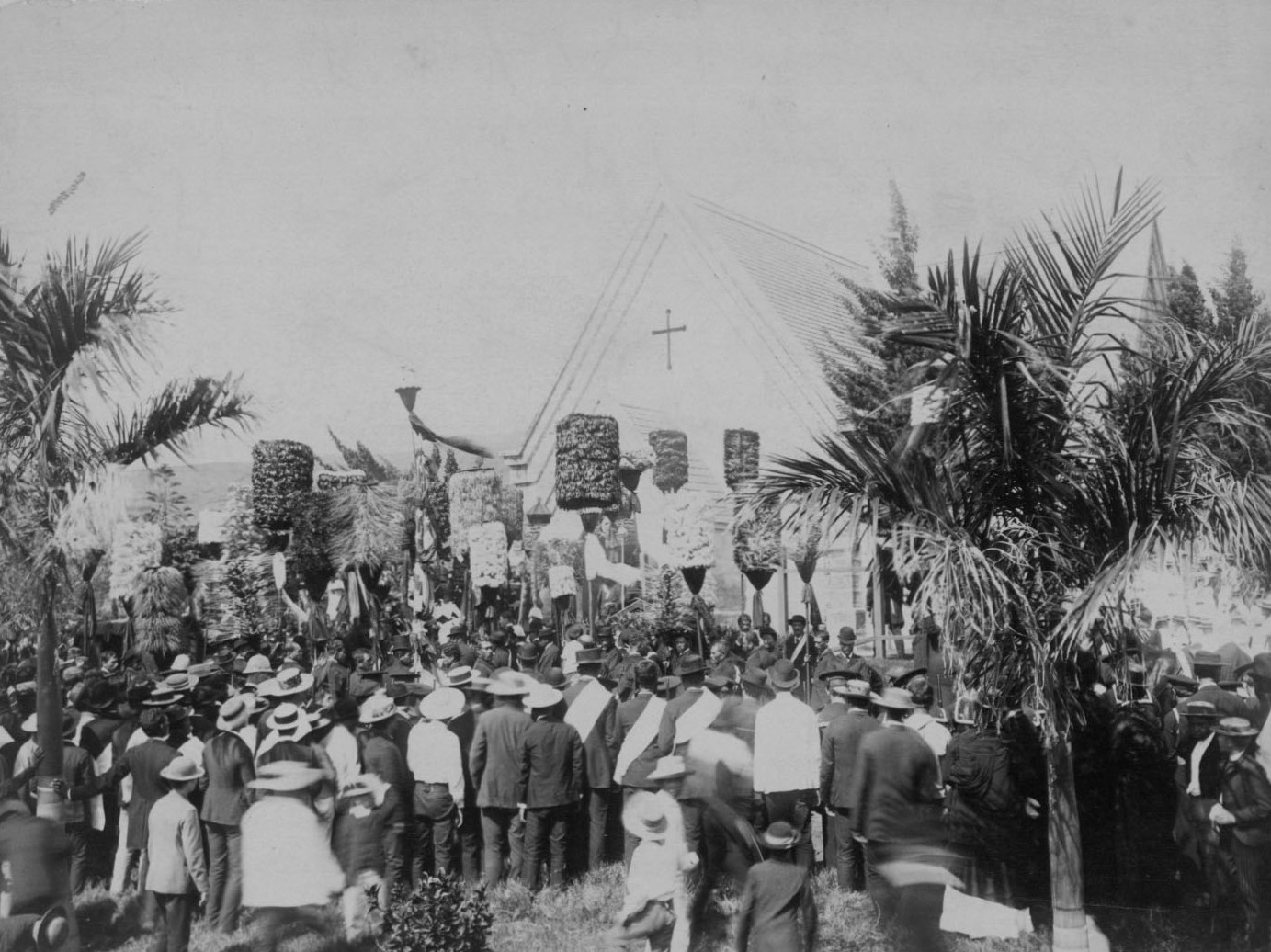
Mourning at Kalakaua's funeral

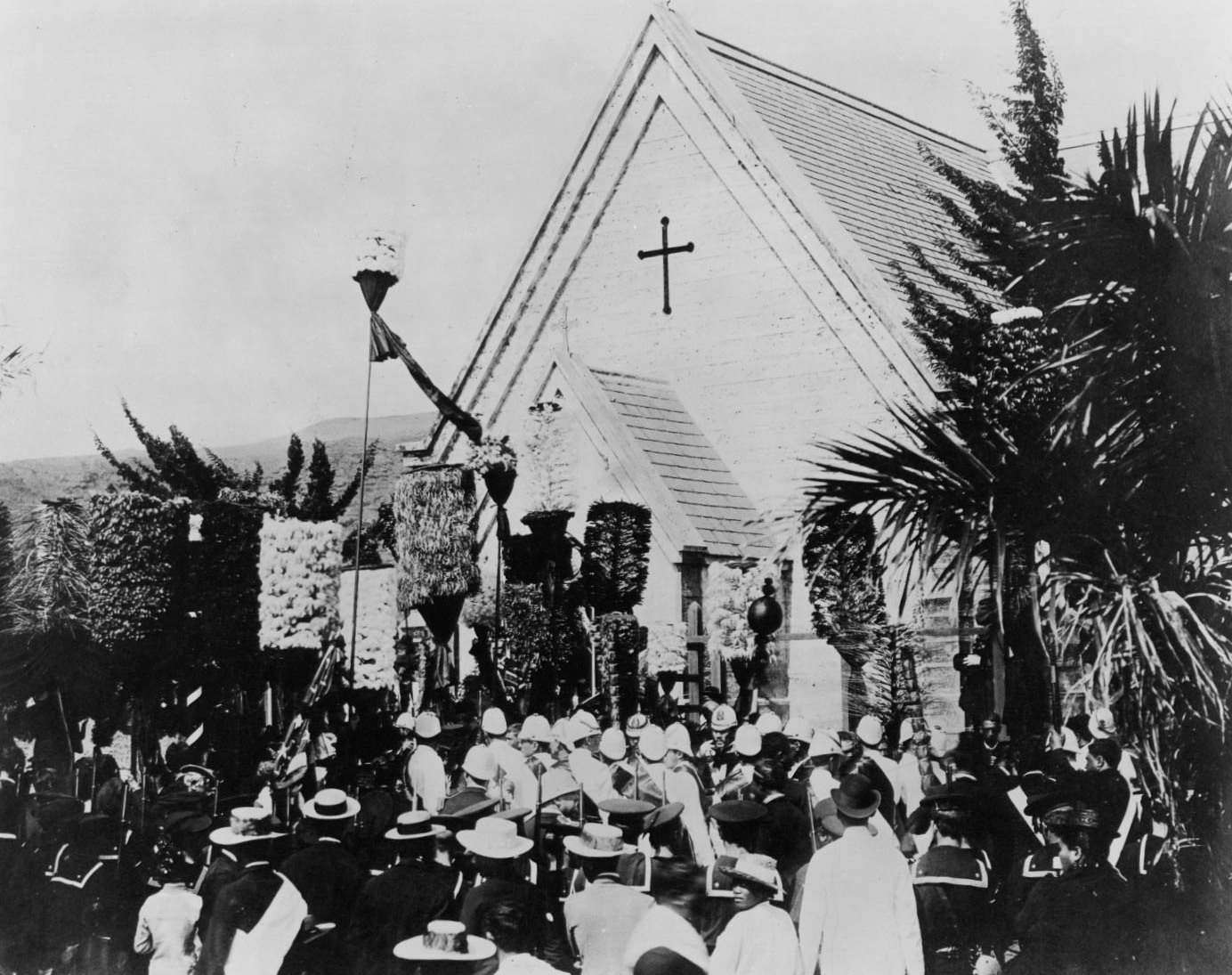
Royal Mausoleum

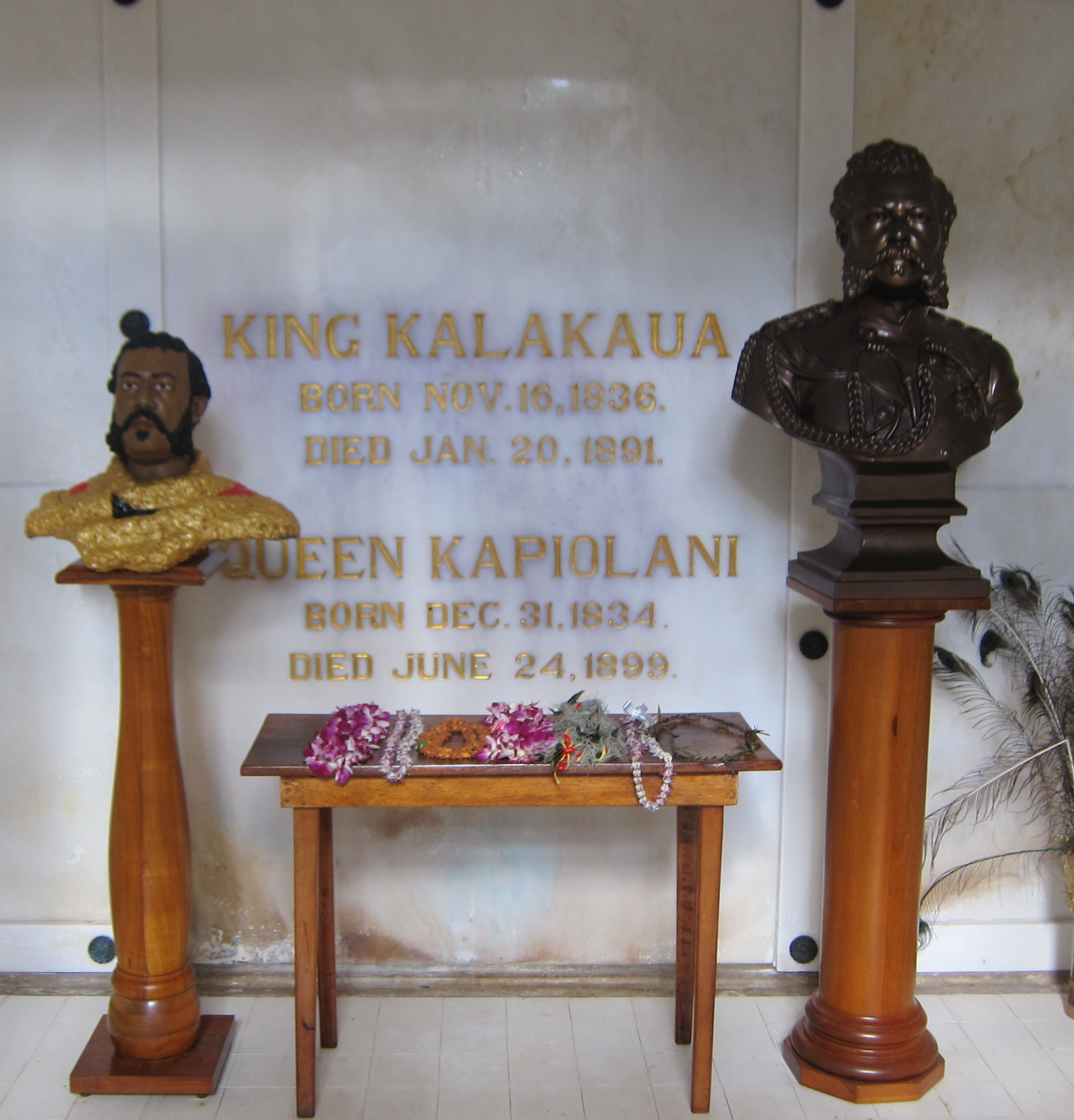
Kalakaua Crypt at the Royal Mausoleum of Hawaii

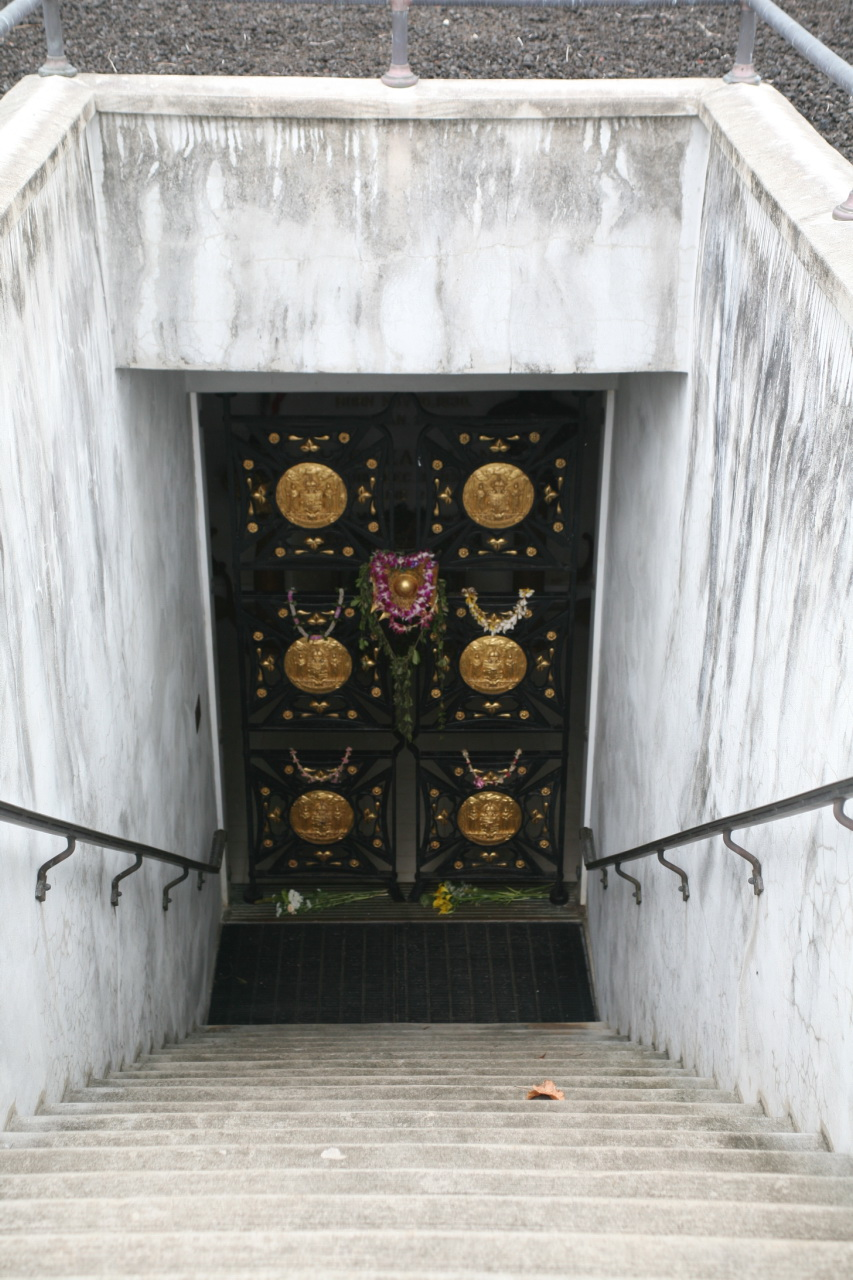
Stairs to Kalakaua Crypt

== See also ==
- Death and state funeral of Liliuokalani
