= Royal governor =

A royal governor is a gubernatorial official, appointed by a king or other monarch, and may refer to:

- Colonial government in the Thirteen Colonies
- Governor
- Governor-General
- Viceroy
- During the Kingdom of Hawaii:
  - Royal Governor of Oahu
  - Royal Governor of Kauai
  - Royal Governor of Maui
  - Royal Governor of Hawaii
