= Kamakau =

Kamakau may refer to:

- Kelou Kamakau, also known as Kamakaunui
- Samuel Kamakau
- Edward Kamakau Lilikalani
- Kamakau (mountain), mountain on Molokai
