= Sovereign Sugar =

2014 nonfiction book

Sovereign Sugar: Industry and Environment in Hawai'i is a 2014 nonfiction book by Carol A. MacLennan, published by University of Hawaii Press.

The book discusses how the sugar industry had changed Hawaiian politics and demography.

== Background ==
The author worked in the anthropology field.

== Contents ==
The introduction is at the beginning. "Sugar's Ecology" is the second chapter. Chapter 11 is the final chapter, and then a conclusion discussing the end of the sugar plantations is present. The book includes 11 appendices, maps, and photographs taken from archives.

== Reception ==
Sonia P. Juvik of the University of Hawaii stated that the book is "a valuable source of information".

Richard P. Tucker of the University of Michigan described the book as "the finest and best integrated study of Hawai‘i’s transformations over the past two centuries."
