= Samuel Kipi =

Royal governor of Hawaii (1825–1879)

The Honourable Samuel Kipi
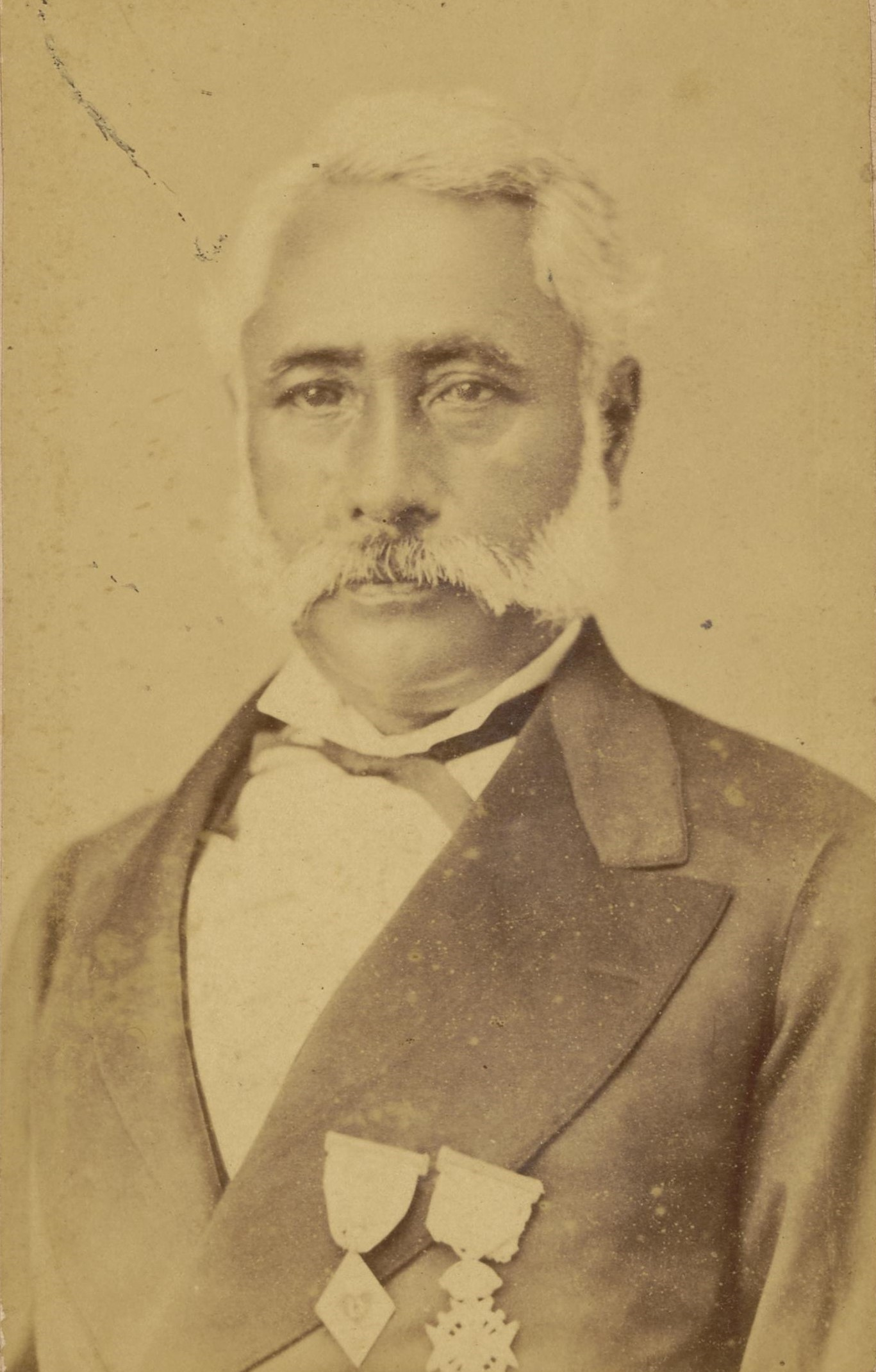

Royal Governor of Hawaii
- In office March 2, 1874 – March 11, 1879
- Monarch: Kalākaua
- Preceded by: Keʻelikōlani
- Succeeded by: Likelike

Personal details
- Born: May 4, 1825 Hilo, Kingdom of Hawaii
- Died: March 11, 1879 (aged 53) Hilo
- Spouse: Nihoa Kipi
- Children: Moses Kipi; Hattie Kipi De Fries; Kahue Kipi others
- Occupation: Politician

Samuel Kipi (1825 – 1879) was a statesman in the Kingdom of Hawaii who served as Royal Governor of the island Hawaii from 1874 to 1879.

== Life and career ==
Kipi was born May 9, 1825, at Hilo, Hawaii, although his gravestone state he was born in 1829 instead. In 1853, he entered the service of the Hawaiian government as a member of the House of Representatives, the lower house of the Hawaiian legislature. Kipi would serve as a representative on and off between 1853 and 1874.

Kipi also served many other positions being appointed Land Appraiser for the island of Hawaii on August 22, 1873, and Boundary Commissioner for the 4th Judicial Circuit on October 29, 1878. On April 15, 1878, he was elevated to the position of a member of the House of Nobles, the upper house of the legislature traditionally reserved for the chiefs

During the royal election of 1874, he voted for Kalākaua over Queen Emma and was severely injured by Emma's supporters in the Honolulu Courthouse riot which ensued after the results were announced. On March 2, 1874, he was appointed by the newly elected King Kalākaua as Governor of Hawaii Island, replacing Princess Keʻelikōlani, representative of the Kamehameha dynasty, as the administrative head of the island. On April 3, 1874, Governor Kipi greeted Kalākaua, his wife Queen Kapiolani and other members of the royal party, while they were in Hilo on their royal tour around the kingdom. The King was welcomed by the burning of the kukui torches at the midday, which the new dynasty had adopted as its symbol. The King addressed the large crowd assembled, saying, "these people of the Big Island are among my most beloved children, being of the land of my ancestors," which prompted, Governor Kipi to state, "We give our full hearts unto you, O Chief."

Kipi was considered "highly esteemed, and [a man] who commanded the respect of the foreign community as well as from his own people." In 1876, Max Buchner, a German physician and ethnographer, met Princess Keʻelikōlani along with Governor Kipi, whom he described as "an extremely worthy and proper-looking sturdy old gentleman in impeccable European clothing." On their trip back to Hilo from Honolulu, Buchner found it strange that the Governor didn't dine at the table with him, below deck, but chose instead to sit "above on the deck with the princess and chomped away at raw fish and poi."

== Death ==
After a short illness, Governor Kipi died in office on March 11, 1879. There is a disagreement on his date of the death but his gravestone gives it as March 11. The late governor was buried at the Homelani Memorial Park and Cemetery (known as the Halai Hill Cemetery at the time). His death announcement in the Honolulu newspaper The Hawaiian Gazette read:

On the 13th, of the present month Governor Kipi breathed his last, at Hilo, Hawaii, after a brief illness of but a few hours. The late Governor Kipi was one of a class of native men who was born a gentleman, and who maintained a blameless life, so far as we can ascertain from those who knew him. He was at his death Governor of the Island of Hawaii, in which position he conducted himself honorably and well. He was also at different periods a member of the House of Representatives, in which capacity he also distinguished himself for uprightness and a manly course of conduct. He was about 52 years of age when he died, but looked much older than that, if one was to judge from the color of his hair, which was actually white. He was tall, slender, and well fashioned in body; had a pleasant expression of countenance, in which was mingled amiability and benevolence; whilst in manner and bearing he carried about with him the air of a genuine gentleman. The death of such men as the late Governor Kipi is a real loss to the Kingdom and the race of which be was an honored representative. Peace to his ashes.

On March 29, Princess Likelike was appointed to succeed him as the Royal Governor of Hawaii.

== Family and children ==
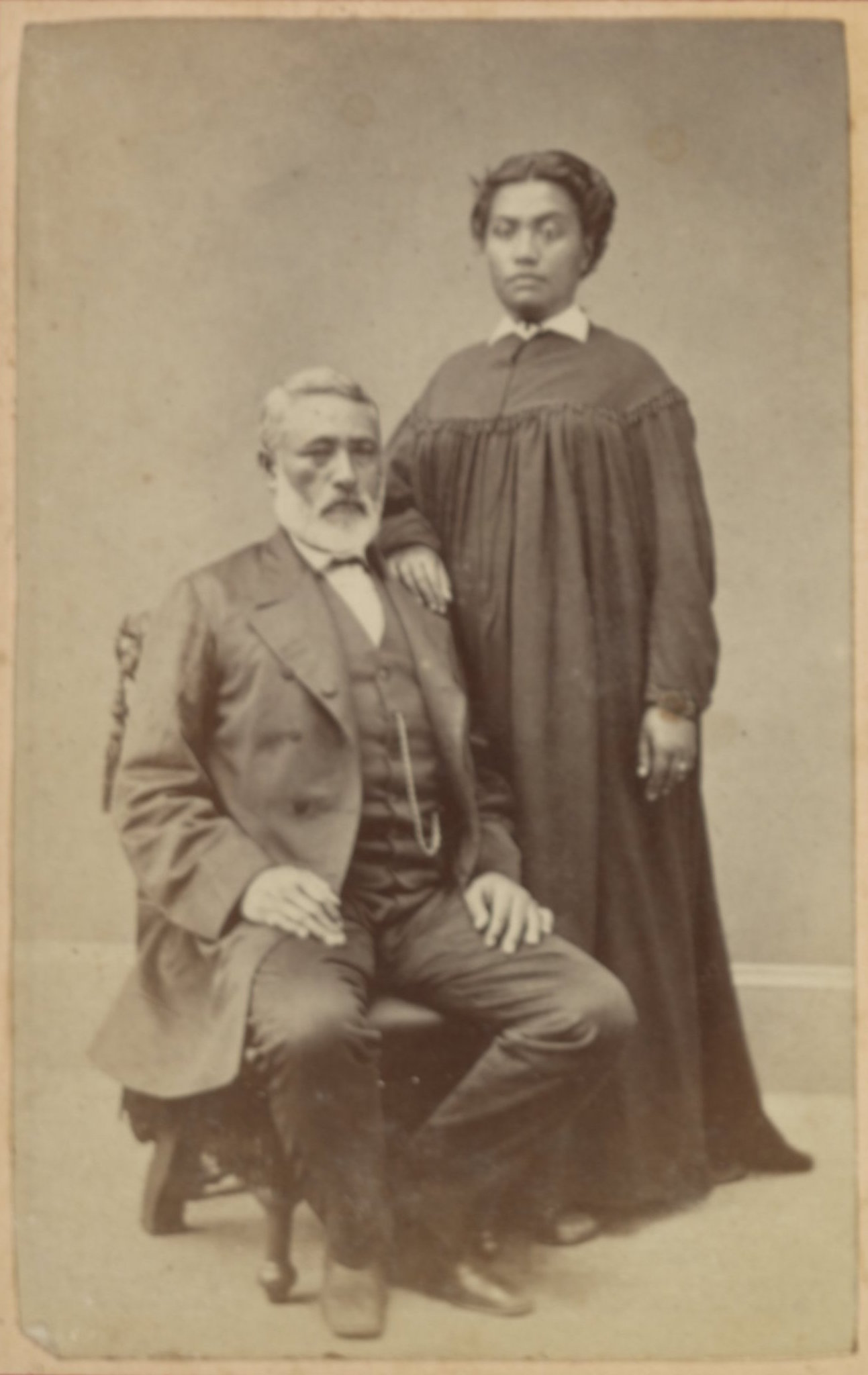
Samuel Kipi and wife Nihoa

Samuel Kipi married his wife Nihoa on September 26, 1849, at Piihonua, Hawaii. Kipi and Nihoa had a large family with many children. After his death, due to his great honesty, fidelity and service to the Kingdom of Hawaii under five consecutive monarchs from Kamehameha III to Kalākaua, his widow Nihoa Kipi was given a pension of three hundred dollars per annum from the Public Treasury by the King on July 21, 1882, in order to provide for the large family of children. Nihoa died in Hilo on either the 10th or 15 April 1885. The editor of The Hawaiian Gazette commented, "The old time natives are fast fading away; one by one they go." He also noted that "she was allied to the old lines of the chiefs." One of his sons was named Moses K. Kipi, who served as luna or supervisor at the Wainaku plantation; he died of heart failure on July 3, 1898, around the age of fifty. He is buried with his father at the Homelani Memorial Park and Cemetery.

Two daughters are known, one named Kahue Kipi and the other was Hattie Kawaianui Kamakao Kaopua Kipi (1864–1913), who married John H. De Fries of Puuloa, Oahu.

== Bibliography ==
- Buchner, Max (1878). Reise durch den Stillen Ozean. Breslau: J. U. Kern. OCLC 457179029.
- Dabagh, Jean, ed. (1974). "A King is Elected: One Hundred Years Ago". The Hawaiian Journal of History. 8. Honolulu: Hawaiian Historical Society: 76–89. hdl:10524/112. OCLC 60626541.
- Hawaii (1882). "An Act to Provide a Permanent Settlement For Nihoa, Widow of S. Kipi, Deceased". Laws of His Majesty Kalakaua, King of the Hawaiian Islands: Passed by the Legislative Assembly, at Its Session. Authority.
- Kaeo, Peter; Queen Emma (1976). Korn, Alfons L. (ed.). News from Molokai, Letters Between Peter Kaeo & Queen Emma, 1873–1876. Honolulu: The University Press of Hawaii. hdl:10125/39980. ISBN 978-0-8248-0399-5. OCLC 2225064.
- Liliuokalani (1898). Hawaii's Story by Hawaii's Queen, Liliuokalani. Boston: Lee and Shepard. ISBN 978-0-548-22265-2. OCLC 2387226.
- Hawaii (1918). Lydecker, Robert Colfax (ed.). Roster Legislatures of Hawaii, 1841–1918. Honolulu: Hawaiian Gazette Company. OCLC 60737418.
- Mellen, Kathleen Dickenson (1958). An Island Kingdom Passes: Hawaii Becomes American. New York: Hastings House. OCLC 1238248. Archived from the original on 2019-01-02 – via Questia.
- Osorio, Jon Kamakawiwoʻole (2002). Dismembering Lāhui: A History of the Hawaiian Nation to 1887. Honolulu: University of Hawaii Press. ISBN 0-8248-2549-7. OCLC 48579247.
- Zambucka, Kristin (2002). Kalakaua: Hawaiʻi's Last King. Honolulu: Māna Publishing Company. ISBN 978-0-931897-04-7. OCLC 123305738.

Preceded by Keʻelikōlani	Royal Governor of Hawaii; 1874–1879	Succeeded by Likelike
