= Ululani Lewai Baker =

Hawaiian high chiefess and Governess of Hawaii (1858–1902)

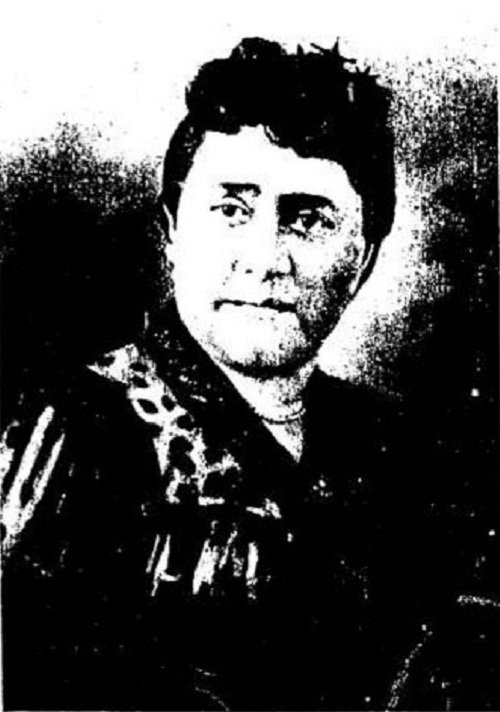
- Ululani Lewai Baker

Governor of Hawaii Island
- In office October 15, 1886 – August 23, 1888
- Preceded by: Poomaikelani
- Succeeded by: John Tamatoa Baker

Personal details
- Born: Ululani Lewai Peleiōhōlani; 1858
- Died: October 5, 1902 (aged 43–44) Mahiki Ranch, Waimea, Hawaii, Territory of Hawaii
- Resting place: Homelani Memorial Park, Hilo
- Spouse: John Tamatoa Baker
- Parent(s): Noah Peleiōhōlani; Kamanu

Ululani Lewai Peleiōhōlani Baker (1858 – October 5, 1902) was a Hawaiian high chiefess and the last Governess of the island of Hawaii from 1886 to 1888. During her tenure, she was given the honorific Her Excellency, the Governess of Hawaii.

== Life ==
Ululani was born 1858. Her parents were High Chief Noah Peleiōhōlani and Kamanu. Considered of high rank, her father's family descended from the high chiefs of Maui. She received her Hawaiian language name Liwai or Lewai from an incident in the 18th-century reign of King Kalaniʻōpuʻu. According to tradition, Kalaniʻōpuʻu hanged his kahuna Naonaoaina after the latter was unable to dig freshwater from the cliffs of Mōʻīlele, near Kalae in the district of Kaʻū. She shared this same traditional name with distant cousin John Liwai Ena.

She married John Tamatoa Baker, who famously served as one of the model of the Kamehameha Statues. They had no children.

During the reign of King Kalākaua, Ululani was appointed as Governess of the island of Hawaii to succeed Princess Poomaikelani, sister of Queen Kapiolani. The appointment was chiefly influenced by the regard to her rank. She served in this position from October 15, 1886, to August 23, 1888, and reportedly "ruled her subjects well". Her husband was appointed high sheriff of the island. Ululani did not hold the post for long. Island governors traditionally had the power to appoint police officers, manage governmental lands, supervise tax collectors and collect revenues for the Crown. However, by the time of Ululani's tenure, the titular positions were mainly given to royal favorites and high ranking persons. The positions had been a source of corruption and was regarded a waste of governmental money.

After the Bayonet Constitution of 1887, the legislature debated abolishing the titles. Because of her gender, Ululani was viewed as unqualified to appoint the police forces for the island, and in 1887 this duty was transferred to the island sheriffs appointed by the Marshal of the Kingdom. Her authority to appoint chief magistrates were also taken away. When she attempted to appoint J. G. Hoapili as her chief magistrate, she found that that power had been given to the chief justice. In 1888, the royal island governorships were officially abolished by the Hawaiian legislature. Minister of the Interiors Lorrin A. Thurston brought the news of these changes to Ululani. She along with her contemporary Lanihau (Governess of Kauai) became the last female governors of the Hawaiian monarchy. Prior to Kalākaua's death, the legislature passed another act restoring the island governorships. However, section 5 of the act stated "No female shall be eligible to the office of Governor". Under this act, Queen Liliuokalani, the sister and successor of Kalākaua, restored the position during the twilight of the monarchy but only appointed males governors. Ululani’s husband was appointed to her former position, but he was removed after the overthrow in 1893.

Her husband entered the cattle ranching business after the end of the monarchy and the couple resided on the island of Hawaii. After a long illness, Ululani died, on October 5, 1902, at her husband's Mahiki Ranch, near Waimea, Hāmākua. The cause of death was tuberculosis. She was fifty-five at the time of her death. She was buried at the Homelani Memorial Park in Hilo, Hawaii.

== See also ==
- Hale Nauā Society

Government offices
Preceded by Poomaikelani	Governor of Hawaii Island; 1886–1888	Vacant Title next held by John Tamatoa Baker
