= Edward Kamakau Lilikalani =

Hawaiian politician (1852–1917)

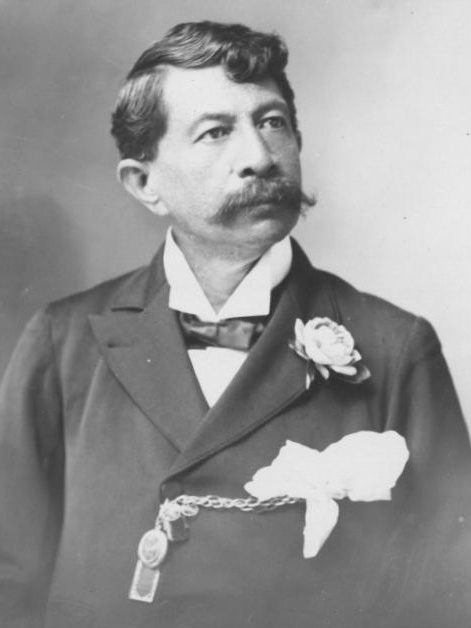

Personal details
- Born: August 5, 1852 Maunaihi, Koloa, Kauai, Hawaiian Kingdom
- Died: November 8, 1917 (aged 65) Honolulu, Oʻahu, Territory of Hawaii

Edward Kamakau Lilikalani (August 5, 1852 – November 8, 1917) was a political protégé of King Kalākaua of Hawaiʻi. He served more than a decade in the lower house of the Legislature of the Hawaiian Kingdom, and after nearly two decades out of office, was elected to the same legislative body under the Territory of Hawaii. Lilikalani was a member of both Kalākaua's Privy Council of State and Liliʻuokalani's Privy Council of State. Kalākaua decorated him with the Royal Order of Oceania, Order of Oceania, Order of Kalakaua, and Order of Kapiolani.

== Family and early life ==
Edward Kamakau Lilikalani was born on August 5, 1852, at Maunaihi, Koloa, on the island of Kauai. His exact genealogy is disputed. His obituary in the Hawaiian language newspaper Ka Nupepa Kuokoa stated that his parents were Enoka Kanihomauole and his second wife Maraea Nalimu o Kiope. Alfons L. Korn, editor of News from Molokai, Letters Between Peter Kaeo & Queen Emma, 1873–1876, noted that Lilikalani's father was George W. Lilikalani, a district magistrate of Koloa, who was married to Hana Ululani Lilikalani.

In 1904, the Evening Bulletin published a detailed genealogy of Lilikalani's family line. Lilikalani filed a claim with President Theodore Roosevelt, the Speaker of the House of Representatives Joseph Gurney Cannon, and Hawaii's Delegate to the U. S. House of Representatives Jonah Kūhiō Kalanianaʻole, claiming to be "the sole heir to the Kamehameha rights to the Crown lands". In a letter to the editor of The Pacific Commercial Advertiser, Hawaiian genealogist and royal claimant Emma Defries asserted that Lilikalani's genealogy was "fraudulent" and that "in his supreme impudence scheme to press his obscure ancestors to the front and claim descendant through Kanuha the great, son of Keawe the second, is absolutely false." She claimed Lilikalani was the son of Kiope and Pouoahukane and that he was born on the island of Hawaii not Kauai.

Lilikalani began his education in the government schools at Koloa under American missionary Reverend James William Smith and later enrolled in Lahainaluna School on Maui from 1869 to 1873 when he entered Oahu College (present-day Punahou School).

== Political underpinnings ==
A long-standing political rivalry existed between King Kalākaua and Queen Emma, widow of Kamehameha IV who died in 1863. After the death of Kamehameha IV's brother and successor Kamehameha V in 1872, the line of succession was unclear. Lunalilo, a first cousin of the deceased kings, was overwhelming elected over Kalākaua and other royal candidates. (Note: Under the 1864 Constitution of the Kingdom of Hawaii, if Ka Mō‘ī (the king) did not appoint a successor, a new king would be elected by the legislature to begin a new royal line of succession. Such was the case when King Kamehameha V (Lot Kapuāiwa), died on December 12, 1872, without naming a successor to the throne. William Charles Lunalilo, who was an overwhelming favorite with the public, ran against David Kalākaua in the January 1873 election. With no constitutional provision for a public referendum, candidate Lunalilo announced one was to be held on January 1, which he won in a landslide of 11,847 votes. His competitor Kalākaua garnered 12 votes. The official legislature concurred on January 8, with 100% of their votes going to Lunalilo.) Lunalilo appointed Kalākaua as a colonel on his military staff. When Lunalilo died suddenly after 13 months on the throne, another legislative election was held on February 12, 1874, in which Kalākaua received 39 votes, and Queen Emma, who was the more popular with the public, received six votes. The election results sparked the Honolulu Courthouse riot. (Note: The Honolulu Courthouse riot necessitated military intervention from the United States and British troops stationed in Hawaii. According to William Fessenden Allen, the riot was not so spontaneous as much as it was planned by Queen Emma's supporters in an attempt to assassinate Kalākaua's legislative supporters. Forty perpetrators were convicted and received either fines or jail sentences.)

== Lilikalani's government service ==
David Kalākaua had risen through the ranks as head of the Young Hawaiians, a political organization with the motto "Hawaii for Hawaiians." In his memoirs, United States Minister to the Kingdom of Hawaii John L. Stevens made no bones about his dislike of Kalākaua, "Wherever he went his train of attendants chanted obscene songs and danced lewd dances." Stevens conjectured that youthful voter support for Kalākaua was based on their own hopes of being elected to public office. One of those young hopefuls was Lilikalani, to whom Kalākaua was a political mentor. He was also known as E. K. Lilikalani or Edward K. Lilikalani.

Queen Emma was dismissive of Lilikalani as a political asset, "Lilikalani is D. K.'s own mouthpiece in the Legislature, a fu-fu, he choaks with fright at addressing a crowd, but D. K. confident in his own past awkwardness & ultimate success, to the very pinnicle of honor and grandure through perseverance and ambition, intends to push this young fellow through. He eventually no doubt will succeed in making a man of him, because practice is the only way to make perfect anything, and a begining [sic] has to be made."

With the king's patronage, Lilikalani was elected to the House of Representatives of the Legislature of the Hawaiian Kingdom in 1876, and served in the lower house through the session of 1886. Under the Territory of Hawaii, he was elected again to the lower house for both the regular and special sessions of 1905.

Lilikalani was a member of Kalākaua's Privy Council of State. He was a captain on the king's staff and a 1st lieutenant of the King's Guards. During Kalākaua's reign, he was also vice chamberlain under Curtis P. Iaukea. The king awarded him the Royal Order of Oceania, Order of Oceania, Order of Kalakaua, and Order of Kapiolani. After Kalākaua's death, he was a colonel on Queen Liliʻuokalani's staff, and a member of Liliʻuokalani's Privy Council of State.

== Personal life ==
On June 16, 1877, Lilikalani married Hannah Kaleialoha Pinao (1860–1909). A sister of hula court dancer Pauahi Pinao, Hana or Hannah was educated at the Kawaiahaʻo Female Seminary. Lilikalani and Hannah celebrated their 25th (silver) wedding anniversary on June 16, 1902, at Kawaiahaʻo Church in Honolulu, attended by Kahu (pastor) Henry Hodges Parker and other congregation members. Queen Liliʻuokalani, was among the celebrants at their anniversary.

Hannah died on June 16, 1909, and was buried on the cemetery grounds of Kawaiahaʻo Church. Edward died on November 8, 1917, and was buried beside his wife, daughter and son.

== Bibliography ==
- Imada, Adria L. (2012). Aloha America: Hula Circuits Through the U.S. Empire. Durham, NC: Duke University Press. ISBN 978-0-8223-5207-5. OCLC 769871251.
- Kaeo, Peter; Queen Emma (1976). Korn, Alfons L. (ed.). News from Molokai, Letters Between Peter Kaeo & Queen Emma, 1873–1876. Honolulu: The University Press of Hawaii. hdl:10125/39980. ISBN 978-0-8248-0399-5. OCLC 2225064.
- Kuykendall, Ralph Simpson (1953). The Hawaiian Kingdom 1854–1874, Twenty Critical Years. Vol. 2. Honolulu: University of Hawaii Press. ISBN 978-0-87022-432-4. OCLC 47010821.
- Kuykendall, Ralph Simpson (1967). The Hawaiian Kingdom 1874–1893, The Kalakaua Dynasty. Vol. 3. Honolulu: University of Hawaii Press. ISBN 978-0-87022-433-1. OCLC 500374815.
- Lydecker, Robert C. (1918). Rosters of Legislatures of Hawaii 1841–1918. The Honolulu Gazette Col., Ltd.
- McKinzie, Edith Kawelohea (1983). Stagner, Ishmael W. (ed.). Hawaiian Genealogies: Extracted from Hawaiian Language Newspapers. Vol. 1. Honolulu: University of Hawaii Press. ISBN 0-939154-28-5. OCLC 12555087.
- McKinzie, Edith Kawelohea (1986). Stagner, Ishmael W. (ed.). Hawaiian Genealogies: Extracted from Hawaiian Language Newspapers. Vol. 2. Honolulu: University of Hawaii Press. ISBN 978-0-939154-37-1. OCLC 12555087.
- Stevens, John Leavitt; Stevens, Nellie M.; Oleson, William Brewster (1900). Riches and marvels of Hawaii; a charming description of her unique history, strange people, exquisite climate, wondrous volcanoes, luxurious productions, beautiful cities, corrupt monarchy, revolution, provisional government and annexation. Edgewood publishing company – via HathiTrust.
- Tsai, Tiffany Ing (2016). "The 1873 Election in Hawaiʻi between Prince William Charles Lunalilo and the Other Candidate". The Hawaiian Journal of History. 50 (50). Honolulu: Hawaiian Historical Society: 53–73. doi:10.1353/hjh.2016.0002. hdl:10524/59459. OCLC 60626541. S2CID 164663327.
