= John Green Hoapili =

Hawaiian judge and politician

The Honourable John Green Hoapili

Member of the Kingdom of Hawaii House of Representatives for the island of Hawaii
- In office April 25, 1892 – July 28, 1892
- In office September 2, 1867 – September 16, 1867

Member of the Kingdom of Hawaii House of Nobles for the island of Hawaii
- In office May 28, 1892 – January 14, 1893

Personal details
- Born: c. 1833 Ke Au Hou, North Kona, Hawaii, Kingdom of Hawaii
- Died: May 1, 1896 Honolulu, Oahu, Republic of Hawaii
- Resting place: Kawaiahaʻo Church
- Spouse: Ami Pinehasa Wood
- Occupation: Politician, Judge, District Magistrate

John Green Hoapili (c. 1833 – May 1, 1896) was a judge and politician of the Kingdom of Hawaii. He served as a legislator for many years. He commonly referred to by his initials, J. G. Hoapili.

== Life and career ==
John Green Hoapili was born 1833, at Ke Au Hou, North Kona, on the island of Hawaii, the son of Kanehoa and his wife Kapaleililahu. His siblings were David Makainui-o-Kuakini and Hoapiliwahine Davis. His family descended from the ancient kings and high chiefs of Hawaii and Maui. He was considered a kinsman of King Kalākaua, who ruled Hawaii from 1874 to 1891.

in 1866, Hoapili was elected to the House of Representative, the lower house of the legislature of the kingdom. He sat in on the legislative assembly of 1866 and the extra session of 1867 during the reign of King Kamehameha V. After serving his first legislative term, he became district magistrate and a district judge for his home district of North Kona and also South Kona, which was a profession he held for a period of 31 years. On June 28, 1886, Kalākaua appointed him as a member of the Privy Council of State. Governess of Hawaii Ululani Lewai Baker attempted to appoint him as her chief magistrate in 1888, but she was blocked by the Reform cabinet established after the signing of the Bayonet Constitution. This political change had limited the power of the King, and the traditional powers of the island governors as well were steadily abolished since they were usually nobles or royal favorites such as Governess Ululani.

After an absence of twenty-five years, Hoapili was re-elected to the legislative assembly in 1892. He ran as a candidate of the Hawaiian National Liberal Party, but the Blount Report later listed him as a member of the National Reform Party. He was elected as a member of the House of Nobles, the upper house of the legislature, for a two-year term representing the island of Hawaii. From May 1892 to January 1893, the legislature of the Kingdom convened for an unprecedented 171 days, which later historian Albertine Loomis dubbed the "Longest Legislature". During this session, Hoapili joined his fellow members in ousting a number Queen Liliʻuokalani's cabinet ministers for want of confidence, a power introduced by the Bayonet Constitution which empowered the legislative branch of government at the expense of the Queen.

Historian Ralph Simpson Kuykendall noted that the "idea of annexation was a factor in the cabinet struggle". One these cabinet ministers Edward C. Macfarlane accused his detractors of being a part of a small cabal to bring about Hawaii's annexation to the United States. This was not the case since many Native Hawaiians members including Hoapili and even a majority of the haole (Caucasian) legislators were opposed to the idea of annexation. On October 17, 1892, Hoapili made a speech to the legislature that "people came to him and told him that the idea was to remove the Cabinet, so as to get an annexation Cabinet in, and annex the country to the United States. If he believed that he would support the Cabinet. He would rather have corruption and scandal than annexation." The 1892–93 legislative assembly would become the final session of the legislature before the overthrow of the Kingdom of Hawaii and the deposition of Queen Liliʻuokalani.

== Death ==
Hoapili married Ami Pinehasa Wood and had many children including David Kualii Hoapili, Lilia Kamakanoe Paikuli, Albert Kaleinoanoa and Kalehua Makanoe.

In later life, Hoapili became a member of the Reorganized Church of Jesus Christ of Latter Day Saints. He suffered a stroke of paralysis in 1893 which gave him slight trouble in one of his limbs. He unexpectedly took ill and died on May 1, 1896, at his residence on Kuakini Street, in Honolulu. He was 66-years old. His widow, four children, and seven grandchildren survived him. The Royal Hawaiian Band played at his funeral, which was attended by Prince Jonah Kūhiō Kalanianaʻole (representing the former Queen Dowager Kapiʻolani) and the Republic of Hawaii Attorney General William Owen Smith. He was buried in the cemetery of Kawaiahaʻo Church. His obituaries in local Hawaiian newspapers read:

The deceased...was one of the old aliis. He was an honest, upright man and one of the best of the race. He was for years, a Judge in Kona, and represented the district in the Legislature several sessions. He enjoyed the friendship of Kalakaua during the latter's reign...

== Bibliography ==
- Blount, James Henderson (1895). The Executive Documents of the House of Representatives for the Third Session of the Fifty-Third Congress, 1893–'94 in Thirty-Five Volumes. Washington, DC: U.S. Government Printing Office. OCLC 191710879.
- Hawaii (1918). Lydecker, Robert Colfax (ed.). Roster Legislatures of Hawaii, 1841–1918. Honolulu: Hawaiian Gazette Company. OCLC 60737418.
- Kaeo, Peter; Queen Emma (1976). Korn, Alfons L. (ed.). News from Molokai, Letters Between Peter Kaeo & Queen Emma, 1873–1876. Honolulu: The University Press of Hawaii. hdl:10125/39980. ISBN 978-0-8248-0399-5. OCLC 2225064.
- Kuykendall, Ralph Simpson (1967). The Hawaiian Kingdom 1874–1893, The Kalakaua Dynasty. Vol. 3. Honolulu: University of Hawaii Press. ISBN 978-0-87022-433-1. OCLC 500374815.
- Loomis, Albertine (1963). "The Longest Legislature". Seventy-First Annual Report of the Hawaiian Historical Society for the Year 1962. 71. Honolulu: Hawaiian Historical Society: 7–27. hdl:10524/35.
- McKinzie, Edith Kawelohea (1986). Stagner, Ishmael W. (ed.). Hawaiian Genealogies: Extracted from Hawaiian Language Newspapers. Vol. 2. Honolulu: University of Hawaii Press. ISBN 978-0-939154-37-1. OCLC 12555087.
- Newbury, Colin (2001). "Patronage and Bureaucracy in the Hawaiian Kingdom, 1840–1893". Pacific Studies. 24 (1–2). Laie, HI: Brigham Young University, Hawaii Campus: 1–38. OCLC 607265842. Archived from the original on 2012-04-15.
- Osorio, Jon Kamakawiwoʻole (2002). Dismembering Lāhui: A History of the Hawaiian Nation to 1887. Honolulu: University of Hawaii Press. ISBN 0-8248-2549-7. OCLC 48579247.
