= Governors of Hawaiʻi (island) =

Regional leader during Kingdom of Hawaii

The governor of Hawaiʻi Island (Hawaiian: Kiaʻaina o na Mokupuni o Hawaiʻi) was the royal governor or viceroy of the Island of Hawaiʻi during the Kingdom of Hawaii. The Governor of Hawaii was usually a Hawaiian chief or prince and could even be a woman. There were no restriction of women in government in the House of Nobles or the Governorship of the islands. The Governor had authority over the island of Hawaii, the biggest island in the kingdom, and it was up to the governor to appoint lieutenant governors to assist them. The governor had replaced the old Aliʻis of the islands, but sovereignty remained with the king. The island governors were under the jurisdiction of the Ministers of the Interior.

== Role ==
The 1840 Constitution of the Kingdom of Hawaii states:

There shall be four governors over these Hawaiian Islands - one for Hawaiʻi - one for Maui and the Islands adjacent - one for Oʻahu, and one for Kauaʻi and the adjacent Islands. All the governors, from Hawaiʻi to Kauaʻi shall be subject to the King.

The prerogatives of the governors and their duties, shall be as follows: Each governor shall have the general direction of the several tax gatherers of his island, and shall support them in the execution of all their orders which he considers to have been properly given, but shall pursue a course according to law, and not according to his own private views. He also shall preside over all the judges of his island, and shall see their sentences executed as above. He shall also appoint the judges and give them their certificates of office.

All the governors, from Hawaiʻi to Kauaʻi shall be subject not only to the King, but also to the Premier.

The governor shall be the superior over his particular island or islands. He shall have charge of the munitions of war, under the direction of the King, however, and the Premier. He shall have charge of the forts, the soldiery, the arms and all the implements of war. He shall receive the government dues and shall deliver over the same to the Premier. All important decisions rest with him in times of emergency, unless the King or Premier be present. He shall have charge of all the King's business on the island, the taxation, new improvements to be extended, and plans for the increase of wealth, and all officers shall be subject to him. He shall also have power to decide all questions, and transact all island business which is not by law assigned to others.

When either of the governors shall decease, then all the chiefs shall assemble at such place as the King shall appoint, and shall nominate a successor of the deceased governor, and whosoever they shall nominate and be approved by the King, he shall be the new governor.

== Abolition ==
After King Kalākaua was forced to sign the Bayonet Constitution in 1887, the island governorships began to be viewed as wasteful expenses for the monarchy. The governors and governesses at the time (who were mainly royals or nobles) were also viewed as unfit to appoint the native police forces and condemned for "their refusal to accept their removal or reform by sheriffs or the marshal". The island governorships were abolished by two acts: the first act, on December 8, 1887, transferred the power of the police appointment to the island sheriffs, and the second, An Act To Abolish The Office Of Governor, which officially abolished the positions, on August 23, 1888. King Kalākaua refused to approve the 1888 act, but his veto was overridden by two-thirds of the legislature. These positions were restored under the An Act To Establish A Governor On Each Of The Islands Of Oahu, Maui, Hawaii and Kauai on November 14, 1890, with the effective date of January 1, 1891. One significant change was that this act made it illegal for a woman to be governor ending the traditional practice of appointing female royals and nobles as governesses. Kalākaua died before reappointing any of the island governors, but his successor Liliuokalani restored the positions at different dates between 1891 and 1892. After the overthrow of the Kingdom of Hawaii, the Provisional Government of Hawaii repealed the 1890 act and abolished these positions on February 28, 1893 for the final time.

== List of governors of Hawaiʻi Island ==
Name	Picture	Birth	Death	Assumed office	Left office	Notes	Monarch
Direct rule by King Kamehameha I.
Mokuhia		Appointed but assassinated soon after					Kamehameha I
John Young ʻOlohana		c. 1742	December 17, 1835	c. 1802	c. 1812		Kamehameha I
Direct rule by King Kamehameha I, later Queen Kaahumanu and King Kamehameha II.
John Adams Kiiapalaoku Kuakini		c. 1789	December 9, 1844	c. 1820	April 1, 1831		Kamehameha III
John Adams Kiiapalaoku Kuakini		c. 1789	December 9, 1844	c. 1820	April 1, 1831		Kamehameha II
Naihe		?	December 29, 1831	April 1, 1831	December 29, 1831	acting	Kamehameha III
John Adams Kiiapalaoku Kuakini		c. 1789	December 9, 1844	c. 1833?	December 9, 1844	11	Kamehameha III
William Pitt Leleiohoku I		March 31, 1821	October 21, 1848	December 9, 1844	c. 1846		Kamehameha III
George Luther Kapeau		?	October, 1860	c. 1846	c. 1855	acting until July 1850 deputy was J. M. Kapena	Kamehameha III
Ruth Keʻelikōlani		February 9, 1826	May 24, 1883	January 15, 1855	c. 1874	Lt. Governor was Rufus Anderson Lyman	Kamehameha IV
Ruth Keʻelikōlani		February 9, 1826	May 24, 1883	January 15, 1855	c. 1874	Lt. Governor was Rufus Anderson Lyman	Kamehameha V
Ruth Keʻelikōlani		February 9, 1826	May 24, 1883	January 15, 1855	c. 1874	Lt. Governor was Rufus Anderson Lyman	Lunalilo
Samuel Kipi		May 4, 1825	March 11, 1879	March 2, 1874	March 11, 1879	Died in office	Kalākaua
Likelike		January 13, 1851	February 2, 1887	March 29, 1879	c. 1880		Kalākaua
Victoria Kūhiō Kinoiki Kekaulike II		May 12, 1843	January 18, 1884	September 2, 1880	January 8, 1884		Kalākaua
Virginia Kapoʻoloku Poʻomaikelani		April 7, 1839	October 2, 1895	January 21, 1884	c. 1886		Kalākaua
Ululani Lewai Baker		c. 1858	October 5, 1902	October 15, 1886	August 23, 1888		Kalākaua
Interregnum
John Tamatoa Baker		c. 1852	September 7, 1921	February 8, 1892	February 28, 1893	husband of Governor Ululani Baker	Liliuokalani

== See also ==
- List of governors of Hawaii
  - Governors of Oahu
  - Governors of Kauai
  - Governors of Maui
- Aliʻi nui of Hawaii
- Mayor of Hawaii County
