= John Tamatoa Baker =

Hawaiian politician (1852-1921)

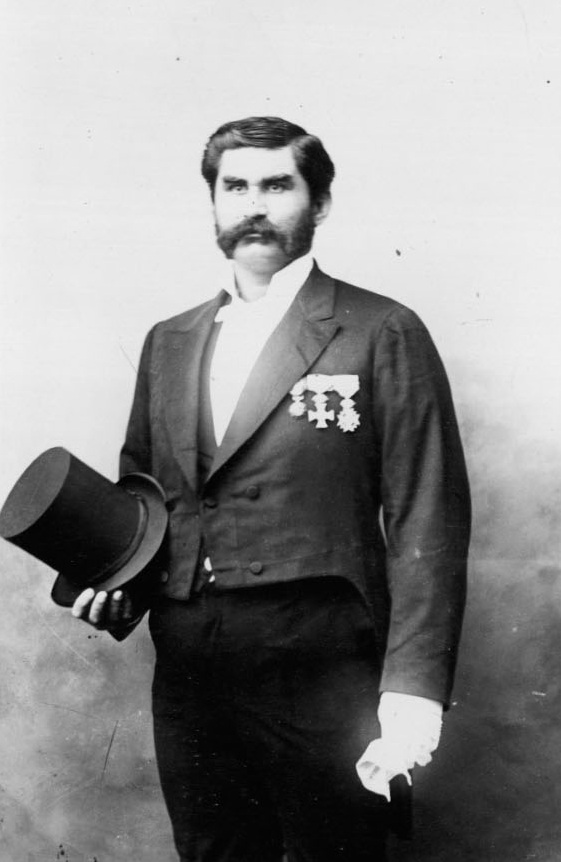
- John Tamatoa Baker in Western dress

Governor of Hawaii Island
- In office February 8, 1892 – February 25, 1893
- Monarch: Liliuokalani
- Preceded by: Ululani Lewai Baker

Personal details
- Born: 1852 Kailupe, Oahu, Kingdom of Hawaii
- Died: September 7, 1921 (aged 68–69) Pauoa Valley, Honolulu, Territory of Hawaii
- Resting place: Homelani Memorial Park, Hilo
- Party: Hawaiian National
- Spouse: Ululani Lewai Baker
- Parent(s): Adam C. Baker; Luka Pruvia
- Occupation: Politician, businessman, rancher

John Tamatoa Baker, also given as John Timoteo Baker, (1852 – September 7, 1921) was a Hawaiian politician, businessman, and rancher who served many political posts in the Kingdom of Hawaii, including Governor of the Island of Hawaii from 1892 to 1893. Baker and his brother became the models for the Kamehameha Statues.

== Early life and family ==
Baker was born in 1852 at Kailupe, on the island of Oahu, of part Hawaiian, Tahitian, and English descent. His parents were Adam C. Baker, an English sea captain, and Luka Pruvia, daughter of an early Tahitian missionary to Hawaii. His adopted brother was Robert Hoapili Baker. (Note: Different sources referred to them as brothers, half-brothers or referred to Hoapili as an adopted member of the Baker family.) He was educated at Lahainaluna School, an institution founded by the American Protestant missionaries on the island of Maui.

He married the High Chiefess Ululani Lewai Peleiōhōlani, who served as Governess of the Island of Hawaii from 1886 to 1888.

== Modeling the Kamehameha Statue ==
In 1879, Baker and his brother Robert Hoapili Baker became the model for the Kamehameha Statues by American sculptor Thomas Ridgeway Gould. The statue was commissioned by King Kalākaua in honor of the centennial of James Cook's landing in the Hawaiian Islands. The original statue was cast in 1880 but lost at sea. A second cast was installed in 1883 at Aliʻiōlani Hale while the recovered original cast was installed at Kapaʻau, Kohala, the birthplace of Kamehameha I. According to Walter M. Gibson, "[t]he artist has copied closely the fine physique of [Robert] Hoapili [Baker]...and it presents a noble illustration and a correct type of superior Hawaiian manhood". Two photographs of John modeling as Kamehameha survive, one in its original form and another in the form of a composite photograph with the bare legs of a Hawaiian fisherman.

== Political career ==
Running as a member of the Hawaiian National Party, Baker was elected to the House of Representative, the lower house of the legislature of the kingdom. He sat in on the legislative assembly of 1886 and 1890. King Kalākaua appointed him as high sheriff of the Island of Hawaii in 1886 at the time of his wife's appointment as Governess. He also served as a member of the Privy Council of Kalākaua and his successor Queen Liliuokalani. On March 14, 1891, he was appointed to the staff of Queen Liliuokalani and was elevated to the rank of colonel. The Royal Governorship of Hawaii Island held originally by his wife Ululani had been abolished by the legislature after the Bayonet Constitution. In 1892, Liliuokalani revived this political position and appointed Baker as Governor of the Island of Hawaii. He served from February 8, 1892, to February 25, 1893. After the overthrow of the Kingdom of Hawaii, the Provisional Government of Hawaii passed an act abolishing the island governorships again; this act passed on February 27 and went into effect on February 28. Baker was an anti-annexationist.

== 1907 travels in the Pacific ==
In 1907, Baker journeyed throughout the Pacific and to Asia. He visited Tahiti, the Cook Islands, Tonga, Samoa, Fiji, New Zealand, the Philippines and Japan. During his travels, he met and conversed with many indigenous leaders and colonial government officials including Tongan King George Tupou II, Queen Makea Takau Ariki of Rarotonga in the Cook Islands. Historian Lorenz Gonschor noted that Baker's voyage was "far more than a tourist venture" and "was an act of quasi-diplomacy in the name of the then US-occupied Hawaiian Kingdom".

== Later life and death ==
Baker became a successful cattle rancher and businessman in Hilo on the island of Hawaii. He established Puʻu ʻŌʻō Ranch at Piʻihonua and at one time, raised six hundred head of cattle including some longhorns.

During the funeral ceremonies in 1917 for Queen Liliuokalani, he helped carry the former queen's crown jewels and orders during the funeral procession from Iolani Palace to her burial at Royal Mausoleum of Hawaii. Baker died on September 7, 1921, at the residence of Elizabeth Booth, in the Pauoa Valley. He was buried at the Homelani Memorial Park in Hilo, Hawaii.

== Gallery ==
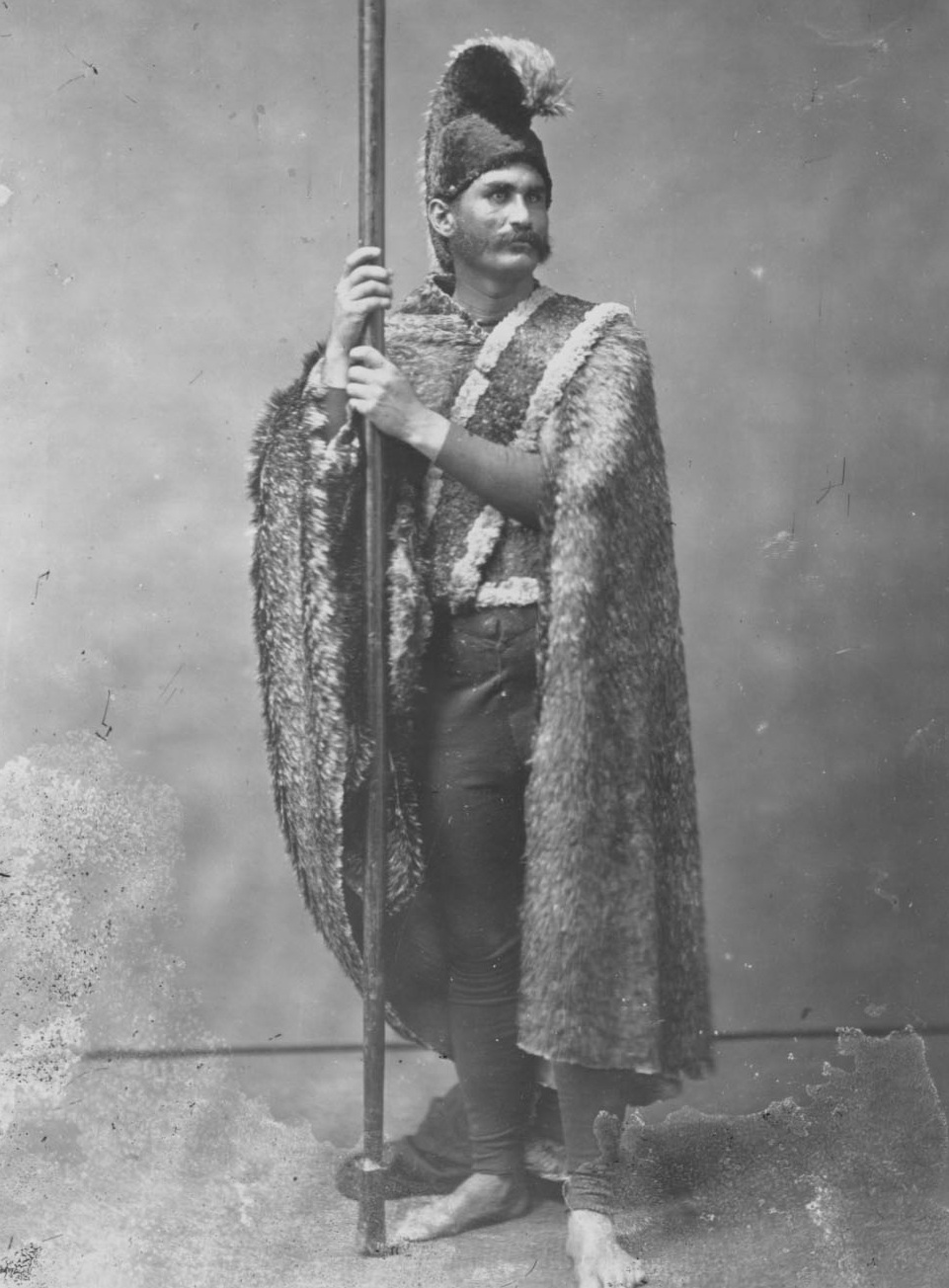
Original studio image wearing undergarment

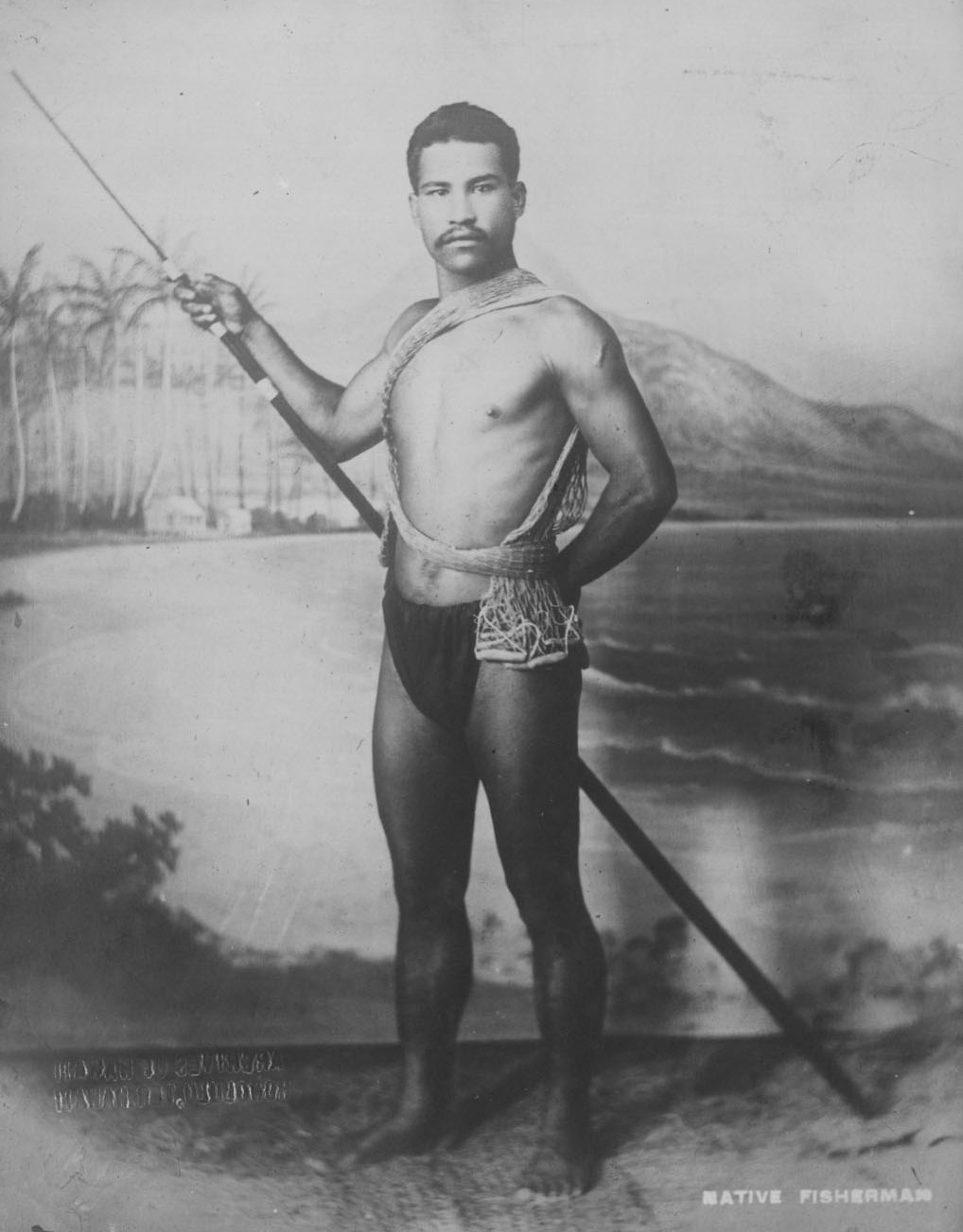
Photograph of a Native Hawaiian fisherman

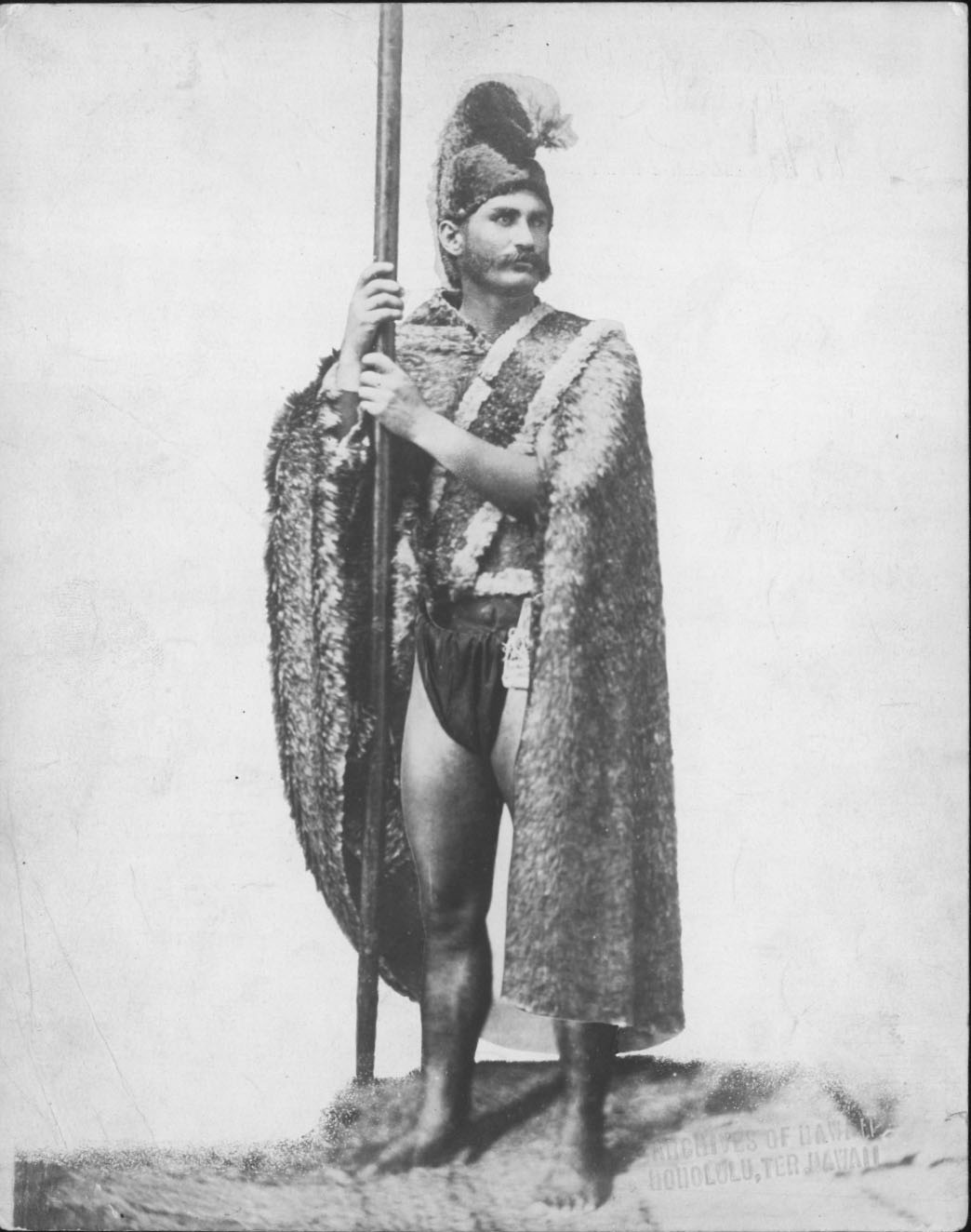
Composite image with bare legs

== Notes ==
Government offices
Vacant Title last held by Ululani Lewai Baker	Governor of Hawaii Island; 1892–1893	Position abolished
