= Godfrey Rhodes =

Royal advisor on the Privy Councils of State (1815 – 1897)

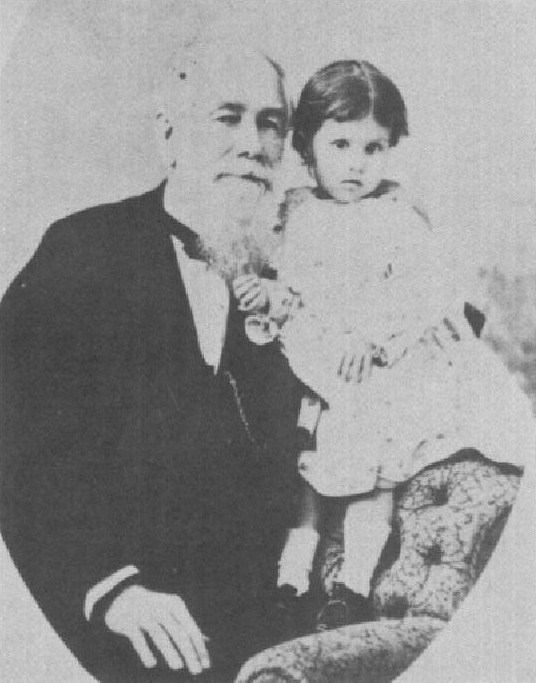
- Godfrey Rhodes and daughter

Privy Council of the Hawaiian Kingdom
- Monarchs: Kamehameha V Lunalilo; Kalākaua; Liliuokalani

House of Nobles
- Incumbent
- Assumed office 1878-1886
- Monarch: Kalākaua

House of Representatives
- Incumbent
- Assumed office 1851, 1866, 1868
- Monarchs: Kamehameha IV; Kamehameha V

Personal details
- Born: March 8, 1815 England
- Died: September 8, 1897 (aged 82) Republic of Hawaii
- Resting place: Catholic cemetery
- Spouse: Nancy Chapman
- Children: Ada Tree Rhodes

Godfrey Rhodes (March 8, 1815 – September 8, 1897) was a royal advisor on the Privy Councils of State to Hawaiian monarchs Kamehameha V, Lunalilo, Kalākaua and Liliʻuokalani. He was both vice president and president of the legislative assemblies of the Kingdom of Hawaii.

== Background ==
He was born in England and left home circa 1835 to work for the Hudson's Bay Company, based out of Fort Vancouver, at what is now Vancouver, Washington. Rhodes signed on with the packet boat Columbia, later working on the schooner Unity. His work took him up and down the north American coastline, as well as to the Hawaiian islands. He would later recall that indigenous peoples of the Pacific Northwest Coast liked to visit Hawaii, and in 1839 it became his job to transport them back to their point of origin. It was on that voyage where he also transported United States consular agent John Coffin Jones Jr. to Acapulco.

Godfrey Rhodes and a partner named Bernard established a coffea plantation at Hanalei on the island of Kauai in 1842. In 1855, he quit the coffee plantation business, believing he had been unsuccessful in the endeavor.

== Government service ==
During the reign of Kamehameha III, the 1845 organic act to "Organize the Executive Ministry" formally established the Privy Council of the Hawaiian Kingdom (Ka Mōʻī ʻAha Kūkākūkā Malu o ke Aupuni). Cabinet ministers, governors of the four major islands of the kingdom, and other members the monarch appointed to act in an advisory capacity, made up the composition of the council. According to the Hawaii state archives, Rhodes was a member of the Privy Council of the Hawaiian Kingdom through the reigns of Kamehameha V, Lunalilo, Kalākaua and Liliʻuokalani.

First elected to the legislative assembly in 1851, he represented Kauai as a member of the House of Representatives (Hale ʻAhaʻōlelo Makaʻāinana) for the years 1851, 1866, 1868. He was vice president of the legislative assembly in 1866 and 1868. Kalākaua appointed him to the House of Nobles (Hale ʻAhaʻōlelo Aliʻi) for the years 1878-1886. He was president of the legislative assembly in 1878 and 1886.

Rhodes had been in ill health in 1882 when Henri Berger and the Royal Hawaiian Band celebrated his life with a concert on his lawn. In a subsequent newspaper interview, Rhodes recalled many events of his life, including the night Kamehameha IV died on November 30, 1863. He and a number of friends had gathered in the king's residence, but Queen Emma informed them that the king was too ill to receive visitors. He and his friends left, and the king died within an hour of their departure. Twenty-eight years later, he was one of a small group at Kalākaua's death bed at the Palace Hotel in San Francisco on January 20, 1891.

== Later years and death ==
Rhodes married Nancy Chapman on January 24, 1882. The union produced his only child, Ada Tree Rhodes. He had been in ill health for some time, and died of blood poisoning on September 8, 1897. Income from his estate went to his widow; upon her death the estate passed to their daughter. The grandchildren would inherit upon the deaths of both the wife and the daughter. In the absence of any living heirs, half of his estate would go to his wife's relatives, and the other half designated for charities in New York and Hawaii.

After a funeral attended by about 100 people at the Catholic Cathedral, officiated by Father Clement and the Bishop of Panapolis, he was buried in a Catholic Cemetery on King Street. Pall bearers were Republic of Hawaii president Sanford B. Dole, William Owen Smith, Thomas Rain Walker (British vice consul to Hawaii), James I. Dowsett, Henry Waterhouse, William Fessenden Allen, J. A. Cummins, Joseph O. Carter and Alatau T. Atkinson. The funeral cortege was accompanied by 16 police officers under Commander Fernandes. Henri Berger led the Royal Hawaiian Band at the burial.

== Bibliography ==
- Lydecker, Robert C. (1918). Rosters of Legislatures of Hawaii 1841–1918. The Honolulu Gazette Col., Ltd. p. 301.
- Kuykendall, Ralph Simpson (1938). The Hawaiian Kingdom 1778-1854, Foundation and Transformation. Vol. 1. Honolulu: University of Hawaii Press. ISBN 0-87022-431-X. OCLC 47008868.
- Kuykendall, Ralph Simpson (1967). The Hawaiian Kingdom 1874–1893, The Kalakaua Dynasty. Vol. 3. Honolulu: University of Hawaii Press. ISBN 978-0-87022-433-1. OCLC 500374815.
