= Privy Council of the Hawaiian Kingdom =

The Privy Council of the Hawaiian Kingdom, also known as the King's Privy Council of State or Queen's Privy Council of State (Hawaiian: Ka Mōʻī ʻAha Kūkākūkā Malu o ke Aupuni), was a constitutionally-created body of advisers to the sovereign of the Hawaiian Kingdom from 1845 to 1893. Its members were known as privy councillors and often involved in the other branches of the government.

== Overview ==
The idea of a body of advisors had its origin in the Council of Chiefs (ʻAha Aliʻi) during the early reign of Kamehameha III and his predecessors. The ʻAha Aliʻi was also the precedent of the House of Nobles in the Legislature of the Hawaiian Kingdom. The first documented meeting on the records of the Privy Council was July 29, 1845, although it may have been formed earlier. The Privy Council was officially constituted after the passing of "An Act to Organize the Executive Ministry of the Hawaiian Islands" on October 29, 1845, in the Legislature, which formally outlined the appointment of cabinet ministers for the executive branch and the role of a privy council.

The body was headed by the monarch or in his absence the Kuhina Nui (premier or vice-monarch). Membership compose of the five (later four) cabinet ministers including the Kuhina Nui and the four island governors, who served as ex-officio members, and other individuals appointed by the monarch to serve at his pleasure. The 1852 Constitution of the Hawaiian Kingdom codified and expanded the role of the body. The role of the Privy Council was to advise and approve all acts made by the monarch such as the declaration of war, granting pardons, convening of the legislature, diplomatic decisions, judicial appointments, gubernatorial appointments, etc.

After the death of Kamehameha IV without an heir on November 30, 1863, Kuhina Nui Victoria Kamāmalu consulted with the Privy Council and proclaimed their brother Prince Lot Kapuāiwa as Kamehameha V. The new king proclaimed the 1864 Constitution which abolished the post of Kuhina Nui, reduced the power of the Privy Council and empowered the position of the monarch. The subsequent constitutions do not mention the ex-officio membership of island governors on the Privy Council. The Privy Council of State was abolished in 1893 after the overthrow of the Hawaiian Kingdom and the deposition of Queen Liliuokalani. The Provisional Government and Republic of Hawaii replaced it with an Advisory Council and later Council of State.

Historian Ralph Simpson Kuykendall notes: "The privy council became a very important body, numerous powers and duties being assigned to it by the [1845] organic acts" and after 1852 became "a most important feature of the government".

== See also ==
- Cabinet of the Hawaiian Kingdom
- Legislature of the Hawaiian Kingdom
- Supreme Court of the Hawaiian Kingdom

== Bibliography ==
- Hawaii (1846). An Act to Organize the Executive Ministry of the Hawaiian Islands. Honolulu: Charles E. Hitchcock, Printer, Government Press. pp. 2–18. OCLC 16345195.
- Hawaii (1852). Constitution and Laws of His Majesty Kamehameha III., King of the Hawaiian Islands; Passed by the Nobles and Representatives at Their Session, 1852. Honolulu: Printed by Order of the Legislature. OCLC 17320934.
- Kuykendall, Ralph Simpson (1965) [1938]. The Hawaiian Kingdom 1778–1854, Foundation and Transformation. Vol. 1. Honolulu: University of Hawaii Press. ISBN 0-87022-431-X. OCLC 47008868.
- Kuykendall, Ralph Simpson (1953). The Hawaiian Kingdom 1854–1874, Twenty Critical Years. Vol. 2. Honolulu: University of Hawaii Press. ISBN 978-0-87022-432-4. OCLC 47010821.
- Kuykendall, Ralph Simpson (1967). The Hawaiian Kingdom 1874–1893, The Kalakaua Dynasty. Vol. 3. Honolulu: University of Hawaii Press. ISBN 978-0-87022-433-1. OCLC 500374815.
- "Members of the Hon. Privy Council of State". The Polynesian. Vol. 1, no. 9. Honolulu. July 20, 1844. p. 1. Archived from the original on December 22, 2015.
- Newbury, Colin (2001). "Patronage and Bureaucracy in the Hawaiian Kingdom, 1840–1893". Pacific Studies. 24 (1–2). Laie, HI: Brigham Young University, Hawaii Campus: 1–38. ISSN 0275-3596. OCLC 193272210. Archived from the original on April 15, 2012.
- Osorio, Jon Kamakawiwoʻole (2002). Dismembering Lāhui: A History of the Hawaiian Nation to 1887. Honolulu: University of Hawaii Press. ISBN 0-8248-2549-7. OCLC 48579247.
