= Kamaipuʻupaʻa =

Hawaiian priestess and Royal Mistress to Kamehameha V

Kamaipuʻupaʻa (floruit c. 1845–1876) was a Hawaiian kahuna wahine (priestess) who served in the court of King Kamehameha V during the Hawaiian Kingdom. Contemporary accounts describe her as a healer and religious figure who held a prominent place in the king's household and served as his mistress. She appears in several nineteenth-century sources and legal records, reflecting her visibility during the king's reign.

== Life ==
Her name Kamaipuʻupaʻa means 'the virgin' in the Hawaiian language. Kamaipuʻupaʻa was an aliʻi (chiefess) from the island of Molokaʻi. She was a healer and kahuna wahine (priestess) who first caught the attention of Prince Lot Kapuāiwa, the future King Kamehameha V (r. 1863–1872), in the 1850s. She served in the household and court of the king when he ascended to the throne in 1863. Her position entitled her to a full purse and a retinue of servants. The king allegedly often consulted her to determine auspicious days for travel. Contemporary sources also described her as the king's mistress. The foreign community disparaged her as a "sorceress". American traveler William Root Bliss, who visited Hawaii in 1872, described her as "a nervous, magnetic woman, shrewd, intelligent, and adept to a wonderful degree." Bliss repeated a popular story in which Kamaipuʻupaʻa linked the February 1871 earthquake on Lānaʻi to a spiritual offense after a foreigner rode the king's horse, which was believed to be inhabited by the spirit of a deceased Hawaiian chief. To appease the spirit, the horse was led through the streets of Honolulu in a ritual manner and was never saddled again.

Kamaipuʻupaʻa was present at the deathbed of the king when he passed on December 11, 1872. Kamaipuʻupaʻa and a Mrs. Brickwood stood opposite Bernice Pauahi Bishop, across from the bed, among those positioned to hear the king's final statements. The king asked Pauahi to accept the throne, but she declined. John Owen Dominis, who was also present, noted that although Kamaipuʻupaʻa was physically close enough to hear the exchange, it was conducted entirely in English and she would not have understood it. The king never named a successor to the throne in his lifetime leading to constitutional uncertainties over the succession. Some historians have suggested that Kamaipuʻupaʻa's influence may have affected Kamehameha V's decision not to name a successor, as it was believed that doing so would hasten his death. However, historian Ralph S. Kuykendall regarded such interpretations as speculative, noting that the king himself acknowledged his cousin Lunalilo as the natural heir but declined to name him successor on the grounds that he considered him unfit.

== Legacy ==
Kamaipuʻupaʻa was mentioned in the 1876 probate case Estate of Kekauluohi as one of many witnesses who testified that she heard the contents of an alleged lost will of Kekāuluohi (died 1845) read aloud, though the court ultimately found the conflicting testimonies of all the witnesses insufficient and refused probate.

In 1896, the Supreme Court of the Republic of Hawaii heard a Waikīkī land dispute that involved lands possessed by Kamaipuʻupaʻa and her heirs. In 1864, Kamehameha V had occupied a strip of land for Kamaipuʻupaʻa after receiving a verbal gift from his cousin Lunalilo. After the king's death, the land continued to be used by Kamaipuʻupaʻa and her heirs. The court ultimately upheld her heir's claim to the land.

Her namesake, the Kamaipuʻupaʻa mound at Moanalua Gardens in Honolulu, is used as a performance site for hula during the annual Prince Lot Hula Festival, which honors the legacy of Kamehameha V.

== Bibliography ==
- Bliss, William Root (1873). Paradise in the Pacific: A Book of Travel, Adventure, and Facts in the Sandwich Islands. New York: Sheldon.
- Boyd, Manu (July 2000). "Kamaipuʻupaʻa evokes Moanalua history". Ka Wai Ola. Vol. 17, no. 7. Honolulu. p. 10.
- Dominis, John Owen (1898). "Correspondence Relating to the Last Hours of Kamehameha V: A Letter By The Late Gov. J. O. Dominis, January 7, 1873". In William DeWitt Alexander (ed.). Sixth Annual Report of the Hawaiian Historical Society for the Year 1898. Honolulu: Hawaiian Historical Society. pp. 13–17.
- Hawaii Supreme Court (1889). "Estate of Her Royal Highness Kekauluohi, Deceased". Reports of Decisions Rendered by the Supreme Court of the Hawaiian Islands. Vol. 6. Honolulu: Hawaiian Gazette Company. pp. 172–179.
- Hawaii Supreme Court (1897). "E. C. Macfarlane v. S. M. Damon, C. M. Cooke, J. O. Carter, C. M. Hyde, and C. R. Bishop, Trustees under the Will of B. P. Bishop, Deceased; and E. C. Macfarlane v. W. F. Allen". Reports of a Portion of the Decisions Rendered by the Supreme Court, of the Hawaiian Islands. Vol. 10. Honolulu: Hawaiian Gazette Company. pp. 495–498.
- Kanahele, George S. (1999). Emma: Hawaii's Remarkable Queen. Honolulu: University of Hawaii Press. ISBN 978-0-8248-2240-8. OCLC 40890919. Archived from the original on September 20, 2023.
- Krout, Mary B. (1908). The Memoirs of Bernice Pauabi Bishop. New York: The Knickerbocker Press. OCLC 4683252.
- Kuykendall, Ralph Simpson (1978) [1st pub. 1953]. The Hawaiian Kingdom, 1854–1874, Twenty Critical Years. Vol. 2. Honolulu: University of Hawaii Press. ISBN 978-0-87022-432-4.
- Myatt, Carl; Mellin, Maribeth; Clerk, Julia (2001). Hawaii. Globe Pequot Press. ISBN 978-0-7627-0608-2.
