= Legislature of the Hawaiian Kingdom =

National legislature

Legislature of the Hawaiian Islands^{1} Legislative Assembly of the Hawaiian Kingdom^{2} ʻAhaʻōlelo o ke Aupuni o Hawaiʻi
- Coat of arms of the Hawaiian Kingdom from 1845 to 1893

Type
- Type: Bicameral (1840–1864, 1887–1893); Unicameral (1864–1887)
- Houses: House of Nobles^{3} House of Representatives^{3}

History
- Established: 1840
- Disbanded: 1893
- Preceded by: Council of Chiefs (ʻAha Aliʻi)
- Succeeded by: Legislature of the Republic of Hawaii

Elections
- House of Nobles voting system: Appointed by the monarch with the advice of the Privy Council
- House of Representatives voting system: Elected by popular vote

Meeting place
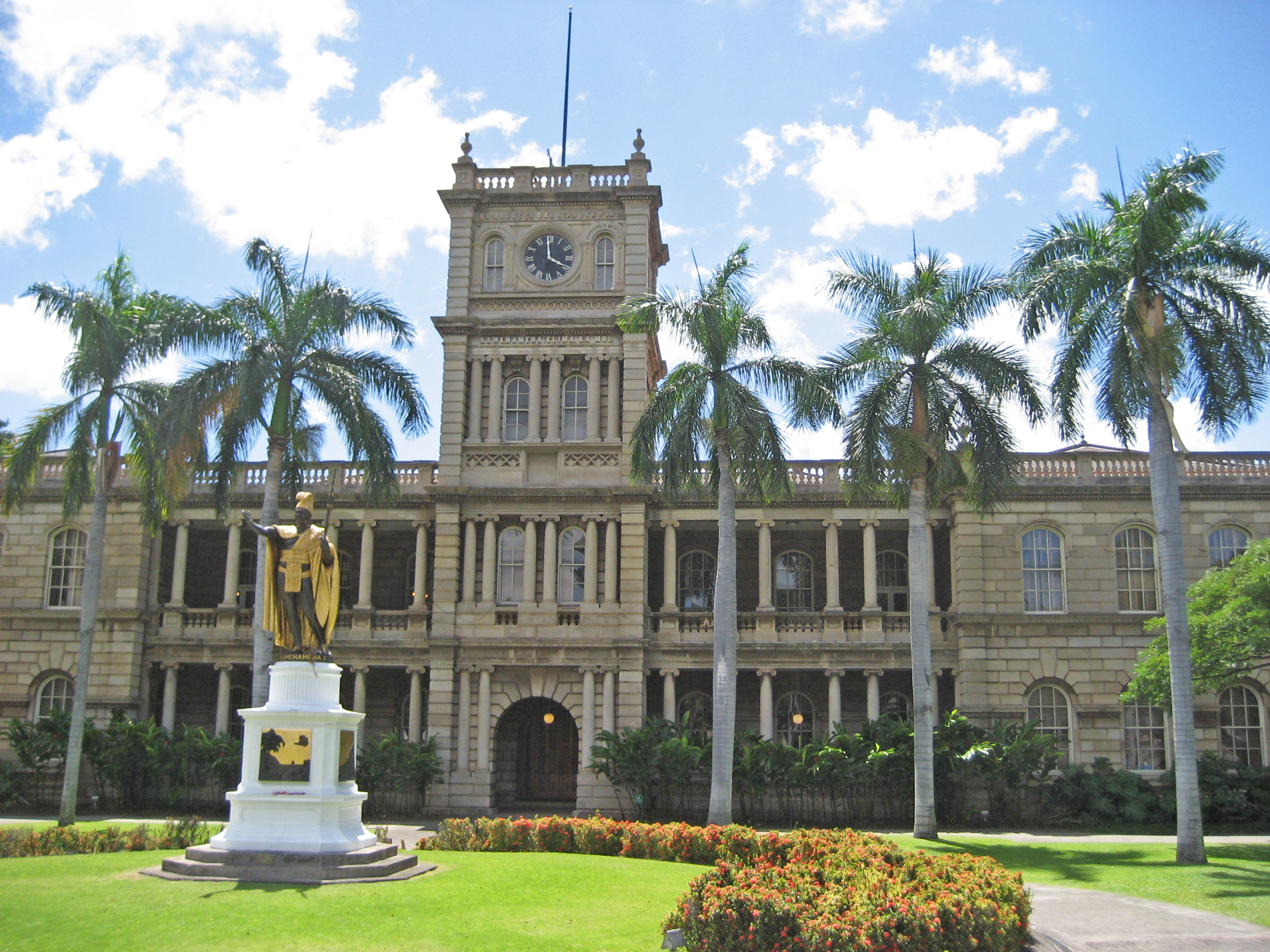
- Aliiolani Hale, Honolulu

Footnotes
- ^{1}Name of Parliament from 1852 to 1864^{2}Name of Parliament from 1864 to 1893^{3}Structure in place from 1840 to 1864

The Legislature of the Hawaiian Kingdom (Hawaiian: ʻAhaʻōlelo o ke Aupuni o Hawaiʻi) was the bicameral (later unicameral) legislature of the Hawaiian Kingdom. A royal legislature was first provided by the 1840 Constitution and the 1852 Constitution was the first to use the term Legislature of the Hawaiian Islands, and the first to subject the monarch to certain democratic principles. Prior to this the monarchs ruled under a Council of Chiefs (ʻAha Aliʻi).

== Structure ==
The Legislature from 1840 to 1864 was bicameral and originally consisted of a lower House of Representatives and an upper House of Nobles as provided for under the Constitutions of the Kingdom of 1840 and 1852, until abolished by the 1864 Constitution which then provided for a unicameral Legislature.

=== House of Nobles ===
The members of the upper House of Nobles (Hale ʻAhaʻōlelo Aliʻi) were appointed by the Monarch with the advice of his Privy Council. It also served as the court of impeachment for any royal official. Members were usually Hawaiian aliʻis, nobles, and royal or wealthy individuals. The position had no salary. It originally consisted of the King or Queen plus five women and ten men. After the overthrow of the Kingdom and the subsequent United States annexation in 1898, this body was reconstituted as a Senate under the territorial constitution of the Territory of Hawaii.

=== House of Representatives ===
The members of the lower House of Representatives (Hale ʻAhaʻōlelo Makaʻāinana) were elected by popular vote from several districts in the Kingdom. Revenue-oriented bills were issued through the House of Representatives, and it also served as the "grand inquest" of the Kingdom.

== History ==
From 1840 to 1864, the legislature existed as a bicameral parliament. However, with the 1864 Constitution, the Legislature was temporarily unified into a single-house (unicameral) legislature. This Constitution also created property and literacy requirements for both Legislature members and voters; these requirements were later repealed by the legislature in 1874 during the reign of King Lunalilo. The subsequent 1887 Constitution, known as the "Bayonet Constitution," restored the two chambers as a bicameral legislature and made the revived upper House of Nobles elected to six-year terms, with higher property ownership requirements.

Following the contentious 1892 Legislative Session of the Hawaiian Kingdom, tensions grew between some members of the Legislature and Queen Liliuokalani. After the Overthrow of the Hawaiian Kingdom in 1893, it became the legislature of the brief Republic of Hawaii, followed in 1898 by the Territory of Hawaii after the American annexation. This was followed 61 years later by the present Hawaii State Legislature in 1959 after the admission to the Union of the Territory as the 50th State. It now consists of the lower Hawaii House of Representatives and upper house of the Hawaii Senate as the bicameral legislative body of the State of Hawaii under the 1959 Hawaii Admission Act and Constitution.

== Presidents of the House of Nobles ==
- King Kamehameha III (1840–1851)
- Keoni Ana (1852–1854)
- Lot Kamehameha (1855)
- Keoni Ana (1856)
- Legislature did not meet in 1857
- Mataio Kekūanaōʻa (1858–1860)
- Legislature did not meet in 1861
- Lot Kamehameha (1862)
- Legislature didn't meet in 1863

== Speaker of the House of Representatives ==
- William Little Lee (1851)
- George Morison Robertson (1852–1853)
- Asa Goodale Tyerman Thurston (1854)
- George Morison Robertson (1855–1856)
- Legislature did not meet in 1857
- George Morison Robertson (1858–1859)
- James W. Austin (1859)
- Lawrence McCully (1860)
- Legislature did not meet in 1861
- William Webster (1862)
- Legislature did not meet in 1863

== Presidents of the Legislature ==
- Mataio Kekūanaōʻa (1864–1868)
- Paul Nahaolelua (1870–1874)
- Charles Reed Bishop (1874)
- Godfrey Rhodes (1876–1878)
- Charles Reed Bishop (1880)
- Godfrey Rhodes (1882–1884)
- John Smith Walker (1886)
- Samuel Gardner Wilder (1887)
- William Richards Castle (1887)
- Samuel Gardner Wilder (1888)
- William Richards Castle (1888)
- John Smith Walker (1890–1893)

== Vice-Presidents of the Legislature ==
- Samuel Northrup Castle (1864)
- Godfrey Rhodes (1866)
- John Mott-Smith (1867), pro tempore
- Godfrey Rhodes (1868)
- Harvey Rexford Hitchcock Jr. (1870)
- David Howard Hitchcock Sr. (1872–1873)
- Simon Kaloa Kaʻai (1874)
- Luther Aholo (1876–1886)
- John Kauhane (1887–1893)

== See also ==
- 1892 Legislative Session of the Hawaiian Kingdom
- Cabinet of the Hawaiian Kingdom
- Privy Council of the Hawaiian Kingdom
- Supreme Court of the Hawaiian Kingdom
