= Constitution of Hawaii =

American state constitution

Constitution of the State of Hawaii
- The Great Seal of the State of Hawaii

Overview
- Jurisdiction: Hawaii, United States
- Created: November 7, 1950
- Ratified: March 18, 1959
- Date effective: August 21, 1959
- Chambers: Two (bicameral Hawaii State Legislature)
- Executive: Governor of Hawaii
- Judiciary: Judiciary of Hawaii

The Constitution of the State of Hawaii (Hawaiian: Kumukānāwai o Hawaiʻi), also known as the Hawaii State Constitution, is the fundamental governing document of the U.S. state of Hawaiʻi. As an organic text, it establishes the principles and framework of government, enumerates the rights and freedoms of Hawaiian citizens, and serves as the supreme law of the state.

Hawaii was governed by several constitutions during its period as a sovereign kingdom and short-lived transitional republic, prior to U.S. annexation in 1900. The current constitution was adopted by referendum in 1950, amended upon admission to the Union in 1959, and further amended at the constitutional convention of 1968; it was most recently amended in 1978, which saw the most significant changes to government and popular rights to date.

As in most states, the Hawaiian Constitution is modeled after United States Constitution and reinforces many of the same basic rights and structures, albeit with more expansive or unique provisions; unlike its federal counterpart, it lists key individual rights of citizens, guarantees an explicit right to privacy, safeguards collective bargaining, and prohibits sex-based discrimination. Reflecting the state's unique history and cultural heritage, Constitution of Hawaii establishes protections for the environment, public wellness, and Native Hawaiians.

Hawaii's local governmental structure is unique among the U.S. states in that it is limited to two levels of government: the state and the four counties, each with a mayor and a council; there are no municipal governments. The amendment process is similar to that of the federal constitution, requiring a proposal by constitutional convention or by the legislature. At close to 21,500 words, the Hawaii State Constitution is nearly five times longer than the U.S. Constitution, but shorter than the average state constitution.

== Background ==
The Tenth Amendment to the U.S. Constitution, which is part of the Bill of Rights, provides that "The powers not delegated to the United States by the Constitution, nor prohibited by it to the States, are reserved to the States respectively, or to the people." The Guarantee Clause of Article 4 of the Constitution states that "The United States shall guarantee to every State in this Union a Republican Form of Government." These two provisions indicate that the constituent states of the U.S. have wide latitude to adopt a constitution as the fundamental document of state law.

== History ==
The Hawaii Constitution was framed by a Constitutional Convention under Act 334, Session Laws of Hawaii 1949. It was adopted by popular ballot on November 7, 1950, and was deemed amended when three propositions submitted to the people—in accordance with the Act of the U.S. Congress approved March 18, 1959—were adopted by the people on June 27, 1959. It was subsequently accepted, ratified, and confirmed by Congress on March 18, 1959, and became effective on August 21, 1959, upon the issuance of a presidential proclamation admitting the state of Hawaii into the Union.

The Constitution has since been amended a number of times in accordance with proposals adopted by the legislature or by constitutional convention and ratified by the people. Its most dramatic and sweeping changes came with the Constitutional Convention held on July 5, 1978. All 34 amendments proposed by the convention passed; collectively, they redefined the relationship between citizens and government, establishing term limits for state office holders, providing a requirement for an annual balanced budget, laying the groundwork for the return of federal land (such as the island of Kahoʻolawe) and created the Office of Hawaiian Affairs to address the wrongs perpetrated against native Hawaiians. The 1978 convention also created an ambitious project of preservation of the Hawaiian culture including the adoption of Hawaiian diacritical marks for official usage, use of Hawaiian names, etc. The Hawaiian language became the official state language of Hawaii for the first time since the overthrow.

Based upon language the U.S. Supreme Court had used to legalize abortion and birth control around the same time, the 1978 convention added the text: "the right of the people to privacy is recognized and shall not be infringed without the showing of a compelling state interest." The Hawaii State Constitution is one of only five in the U.S. to explicitly define a right to privacy.

== Preamble ==
The preamble to the current Constitution of Hawaii states, "We, the people of the State of Hawaii, grateful for Divine Guidance, and mindful of our Hawaiian heritage, reaffirm our belief in a government of the people, by the people and for the people, and with an understanding heart toward all peoples of the earth do hereby ordain and establish this constitution for the State of Hawaii."

== Bill of Rights ==
The preamble is followed by a twenty-point Bill of rights:

- All political power of this State is inherent in the people; and the responsibility for the exercise thereof rests with the people. All government is founded on this authority.
- All persons are free by nature and are equal in their inherent and inalienable rights. Among these rights are the enjoyment of life, liberty and the pursuit of happiness, and the acquiring and possessing property. These rights cannot endure unless the people recognize their corresponding obligations and responsibilities.
- No law shall be enacted respecting an establishment of religion, or prohibiting the free exercise thereof, or abridging the freedom of speech or of the press, or the right of the people peaceably to assemble and to petition the government for a redress of grievances.
- No person shall be deprived of life, liberty, or property without due process of law, nor be denied the equal protection of the laws, nor be denied the enjoyment of his civil rights or be discriminated against in the exercise thereof because of race, religion, sex or ancestry.
- The right of the people to be secure in their persons, houses, papers and effects against unreasonable searches, seizures, and invasions of privacy shall not be violated; and no warrants shall issue but upon probable cause, supported by oath or affirmation, particularly describing the place to be searched and the persons or things to be seized or the communications sought to be intercepted.
- No citizen shall be disfranchised, or deprived of any of the rights or privileges secured to other citizens, unless by the law of the land.
- No citizen shall be denied enlistment in any military organization of this State nor be segregated therein because of race, religious principles or ancestry.
- No person shall be held to answer for a capital or otherwise infamous crime, unless on a presentment or indictment of a grand jury, except in cases arising in the armed forces when in actual service in time of war or public danger; nor shall any person be subject for the same offense to be twice put in jeopardy; nor shall any person be compelled in any criminal case to be a witness against himself.
- Excessive bail shall not be required, nor excessive fines imposed, nor cruel or unusual punishment inflicted. The court may dispense with bail if reasonably satisfied that the defendant or witness will appear when directed, except for a defendant charged with an offense punishable by life imprisonment.
- In suits at common law where the value in controversy shall exceed one hundred dollars, the right of trial by jury shall be preserved. The legislature may provide for a verdict by not less than three-fourths of the members of the jury.
- In all criminal prosecutions, the accused shall enjoy the right to a speedy and public trial, by an impartial jury of the district wherein the crime shall have been committed, which district shall have been previously ascertained by law, or of such other district to which the prosecution may be removed with the consent of the accused; to be informed of the nature and cause of the accusation; to be confronted with the witnesses against him; to have compulsory process for obtaining witnesses in his favor; to have the assistance of counsel for his defense. The State shall provide counsel for an indigent defendant charged with an offense punishable by imprisonment for more than sixty days.
- No person shall be disqualified to serve as a juror because of sex.
- The privilege of the writ of habeas corpus shall not be suspended, unless when in cases of rebellion or invasion the public safety may require it. The power of suspending the privilege of the writ of habeas corpus, and the laws or the execution thereof, shall never be exercised except by the legislature, or by authority derived from it to be exercised in such particular cases only as the legislature shall expressly prescribe.
- The military shall be held in strict subordination to the civil power.
- A well regulated militia being necessary to the security of a free state, the right of the people to keep and bear arms shall not be infringed.
- No soldier or member of the militia shall, in time of peace, be quartered in any house, without the consent of the owner or occupant, nor in time of war, except in a manner prescribed by law.
- There shall be no imprisonment for debt.
- Private property shall not be taken or damaged for public use without just compensation.
- The power of the State to act in the general welfare shall never be impaired by the making of any irrevocable grant of special privileges or immunities.
- The enumeration of rights and privileges shall not be construed to impair or deny others retained by the people.

== List of constitutions ==
- 1840 Constitution of the Kingdom of Hawaiʻi
- 1852 Constitution of the Kingdom of Hawaiʻi
- 1864 Constitution of the Kingdom of Hawaiʻi
- 1887 Constitution of the Kingdom of Hawaiʻi
- 1893 Constitution of the Kingdom of Hawaiʻi
- 1894 Constitution of the Republic of Hawaiʻi
- 1950 Hawaiʻi State Constitutional Convention
- 1959 Hawaiʻi State Constitutional Convention
- 1968 Hawaiʻi State Constitutional Convention
- 1978 Hawaiʻi State Constitutional Convention
