= House of Nobles =

House of Nobles can refer to:

- House of Nobles (Hawaii), a political institution in the Kingdom of Hawaii, part of the Legislature of the Hawaiian Kingdom
- House of Nobles, an alternate name for the House of Knights, a corporation of the Swedish nobility
