= Keoni Ana =

Hawaiian politician (1810–1857)

- Kuhina Nui of the Hawaiian Islands and Minister of Interior
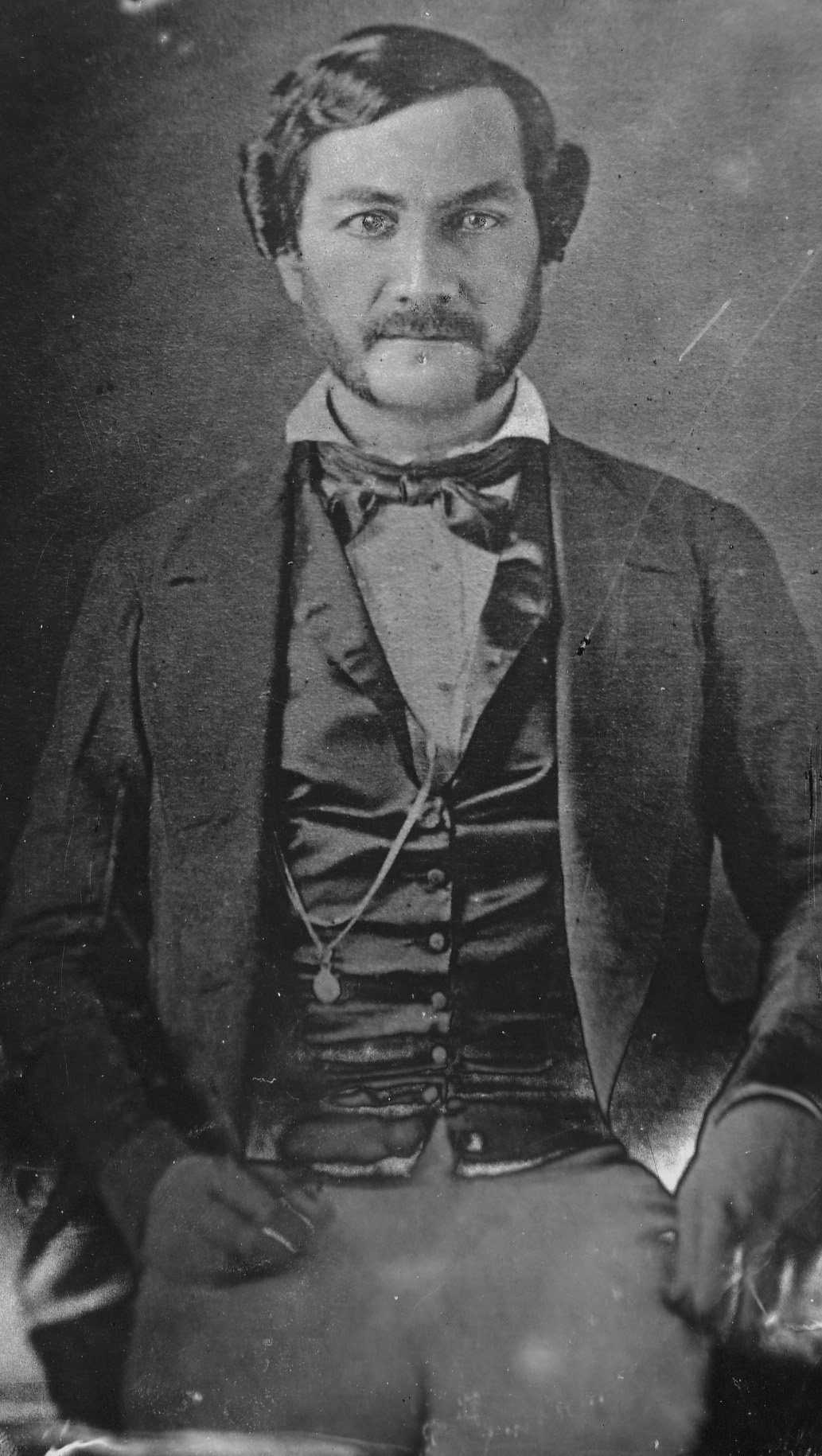

Kuhina Nui of the Hawaiian Islands
- Reign: June 10, 1845 – September 5, 1853
- Predecessor: Kaʻahumanu III
- Successor: Lot Kapuāiwa
- Reign: September 14, 1853 – January 15, 1855
- Predecessor: Lot Kapuāiwa
- Successor: Kaʻahumanu IV
- Born: March 12, 1810; Kawaihae, island of Hawaii
- Died: July 18, 1857 (aged 47); Honolulu, Oahu
- Burial: Mauna ʻAla Royal Mausoleum
- Spouse: Julia Alapai; Ulumaheihei
- Issue: Peter Kaʻeo (hānai)
Names
- John Kalaipaihala Young II, Keoni Ana ʻOpio
- House: House of Keoua; House of Keliimaikai
- Father: John Young
- Mother: Kaʻōanaʻeha

Keoni Ana, full name John Kalaipaihala Young II (March 12, 1810 – July 18, 1857), was a politician in the Kingdom of Hawaii, serving as Kuhina Nui of the Hawaiian Islands and Minister of Interior.

== Early life ==
Keoni Ana was born on March 12, 1810, in Kawaihae, Hawaii. He was the only son of John Young, the English sailor who became a trusted adviser to King Kamehameha I, by his second wife Kaʻōanaʻeha, the niece of Kamehameha I. He was the elder brother of Jane Lahilahi, younger brother of Fanny Kekelaokalani and Grace Kamaikui, and younger half-brother of James Kānehoa and Robert Young.

He, his siblings, and Isaac Davis' children, grew up on their father's homestead granted to them by the king, overlooking the Kawaihae Bay. It is now part of the Puʻukoholā Heiau National Historic Site.

== Politics ==
He grew up as the favorite companion of Prince Kauikeaouli, who took the throne as King Kamehameha III. The two friends' relationship was severely damaged when Keoni Ana was caught in the bedroom of Queen Kalama, the King's wife, shortly after the birth of Prince Keaweaweulaokalani in 1839. The sentence of death was only avoided through the intervention of Queen Dowager Kalākua Kaheiheimālie. It seem after the incident, Kamehameha III forgave him. Keoni Ana held several government positions, including service in the House of Nobles 1841–1856, the Privy Council 1845–1857, as a Supreme Court justice, royal governor of Maui, and as chamberlain of Kamehameha III's household. He aided in communication between native Hawaiian and foreign elements in the community.

On June 10, 1845, he was appointed Kuhina Nui by Kamehameha III because Victoria Kamāmalu, the designated successor of her mother, Kīnaʻu, was still a minor. He succeeded Kekāuluohi as Kuhina Nui and served from June 10, 1845 until September 5, 1853, when he was temporarily succeeded by Prince Lot Kapuāiwa. After Lot Kapuāiwa resigned nine days later, on September 14, 1853, Keoni Ana resumed the office and remained Kuhina Nui until January 15, 1855. After Keoni Ana became Kuhina Nui the Legislative Assembly passed several acts that organized the executive ministries and departments of the government. This legislation provided that the Kuhina Nui served also as Minister of the Interior. More far-reaching was the creation of the Board of Commissioners to Quiet Land Titles, which would forever change the system of land tenure in Hawaii in what would be known as the Great Mahele. Keoni Ana served on a committee to assist the king and chiefs in defining their rights and interests in the lands within the kingdom. As a very close friend and ally of the Kauikeaouli, Keoni Ana recognized that the Kuhina Nui's authority challenged the king's prestige and power. Keoni Ana supported Kamehameha III and IV in their attempt to abolish the office.

His position as Kuhina Nui was not renewed in 1855 by Kamehameha IV, who chose his sister as the new Kuhina Nui, but he remained Minister of the Interior.

== Marriages ==
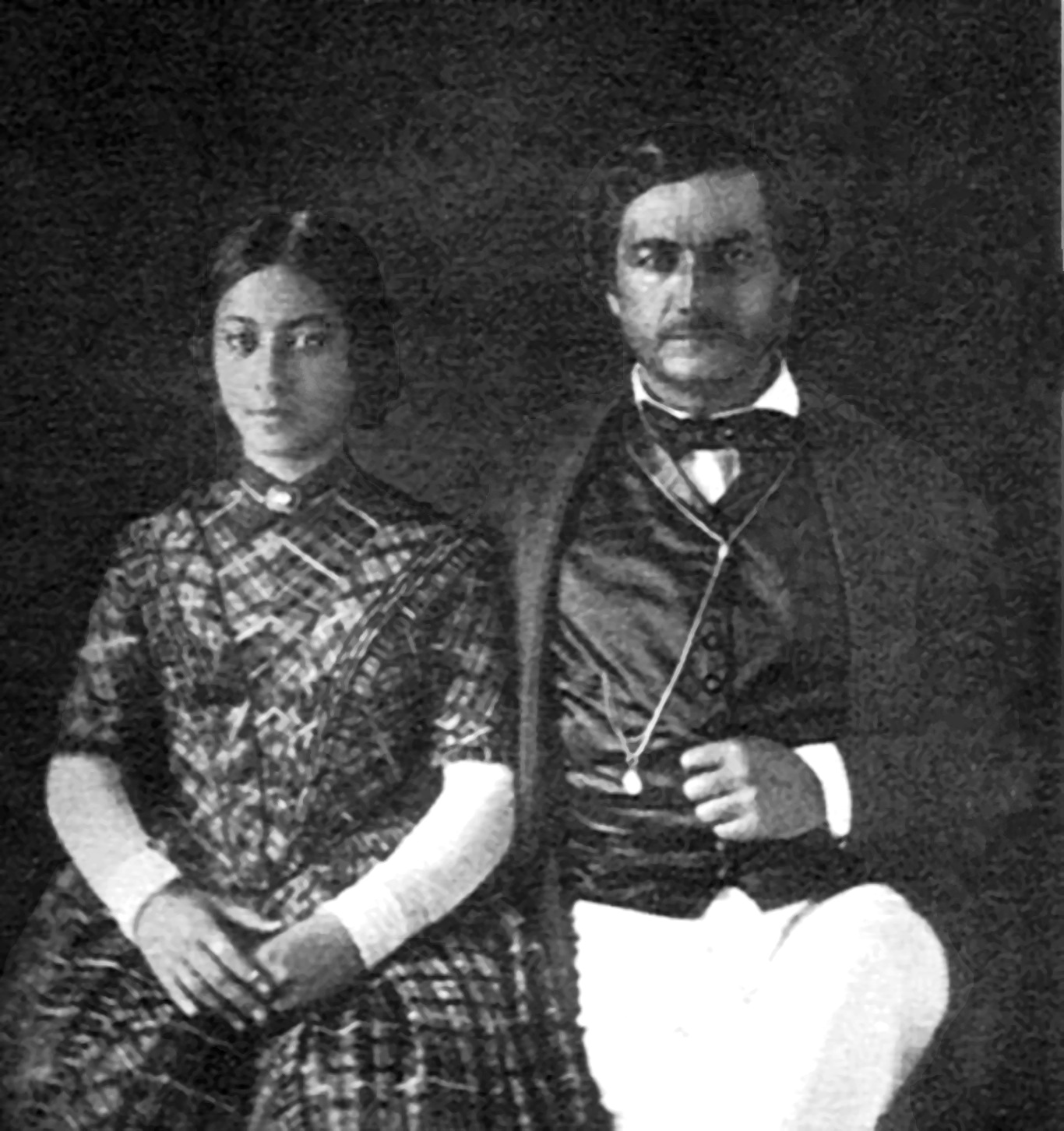
Keoni Ana with his niece Emma.

He married three times, each time to Hawaiians of noble birth.

He married Julia Alapai, elder daughter of Nahili. Keoni Ana seemed to love Alapai the most; a portrait of the chiefess can still be seen at the Hānaiakamalama house, but they were childless. His later marriage, most likely after Alapai's passing, was to the Elizabeth Kekaaniau's first cousin, High Chiefess ʻUlumaheihei, daughter of Waipa and Kekaikuihala, daughter of Aliʻi Nuhi of Waimea, and Kaohelelani of Hana. All of his marriages were childless. He adopted his nephew Peter Kaeo, son of his sister Jane. He bought Hānaiakamalama in an auction and willed it to his niece Emma Rooke, who became Queen Emma and used at it as her summer palace. He died July 18, 1857, and was buried at the Royal Mausoleum at Mauna ʻAla. His only heirs were his niece Emma and nephew Peter.

== See also ==
- John Young (Hawaii) family tree

Preceded by Kaʻahumanu III	Kuhina Nui of the Hawaiian Islands; June 10, 1845 – September 5, 1853	Succeeded by Lot Kapuāiwa
Preceded by Lot Kapuāiwa	Kuhina Nui of the Hawaiian Islands; September 14, 1853 – January 15, 1855	Succeeded by Kaʻahumanu IV
