= 1864 Constitution of the Hawaiian Kingdom =

The 1864 Constitution of the Hawaiian Kingdom abrogated the 1852 constitution issued by King Kamehameha III. It dramatically changed the way Hawaii's government worked by increasing the power of the king and changing the way the kingdom's legislature worked. It was Hawaii's constitution from 1864 through 1887, during the reigns of kings Kamehameha V, Lunalilo, and Kalākaua. It was replaced by the 1887 constitution.

== Background ==
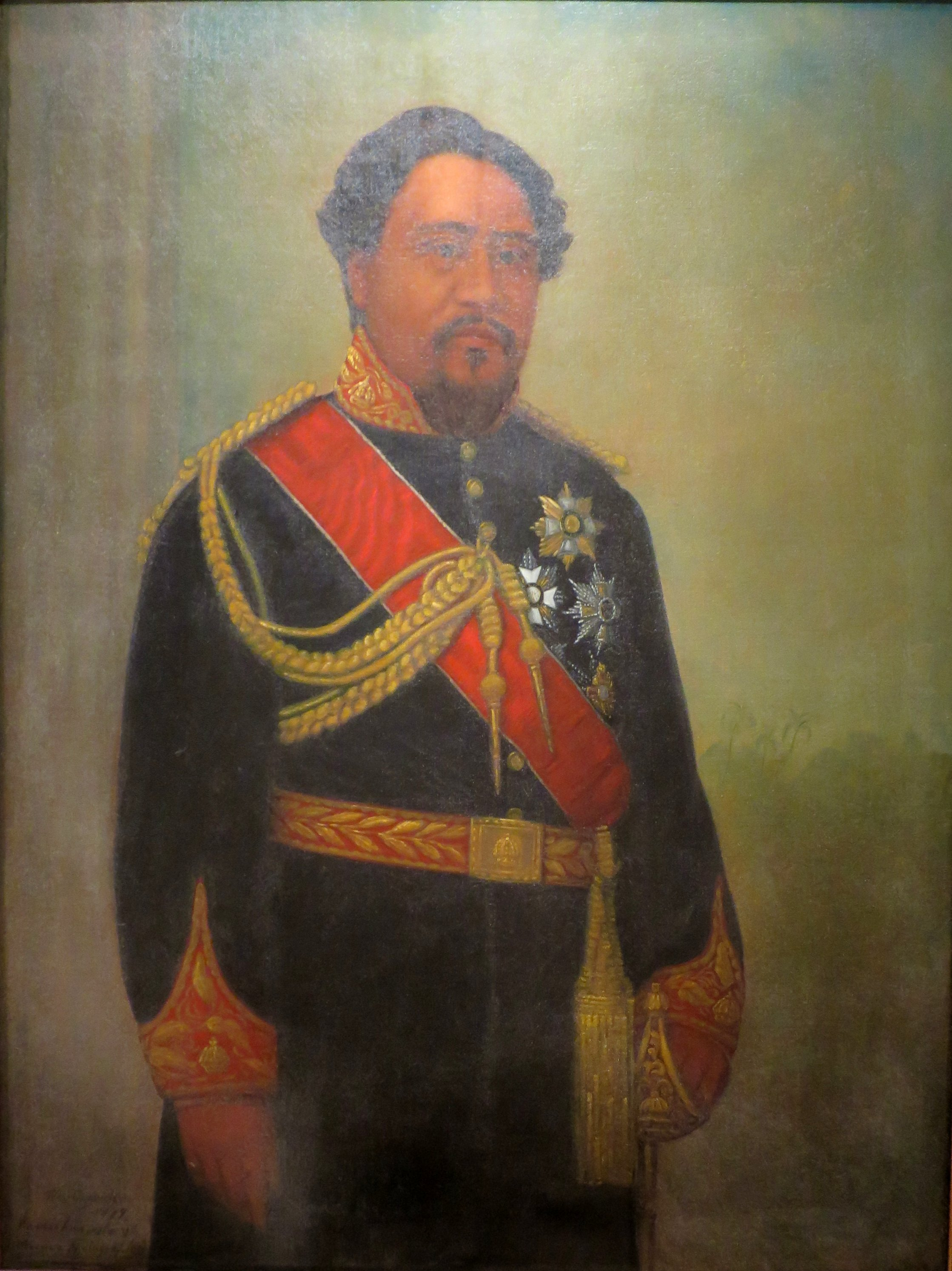
Kamehameha V wrote the Constitution of 1864.

Kamehameha V ascended the throne in 1863. He was a firm believer that the king should be the person firmly in control of Hawaii's government and was against certain aspects of the 1852 constitution. Kamehameha V (as well as his predecessor, Kamehameha IV) was often irritated by the controls on his power by the constitution. Thus, when Kamehameha V ascended the throne, he refused to take an oath to the 1852 constitution. Instead, he called for a constitutional convention.

== The Constitutional Convention ==
For the convention, delegates were chosen by election. They met at Kawaiahaʻo on July 7, 1864 through August 13.

The members of the convention however, were not able to agree on Kamehameha V's constitution. Kamehameha V quickly grew impatient, dissolved the convention and, conferring with his advisors, drafted his own constitution.

On August 20, 1864 he simply abrogated the 1852 constitution as the ultimate law of the land. Even though Kamehameha V's actions did not follow the provisions set by the 1852 constitution on amending the constitution, it went without resistance for 23 years.

== Changes in Hawaiʻi's Government ==
The Constitution of 1864 brought several changes to Hawaii's government. Among these changes were:

- Abolishment of the office of kuhina nui (Hawaii's version of the prime minister), an office that Kamehameha I created upon his death.
- Change of Hawai'i's legislature from a bicameral legislature to a unicameral legislature. Prior to 1864, there were two separate houses in the legislature: The House of Nobles and the House of Representatives. After 1864, the Nobles and Representatives met together as a single body, known as the Legislative Assembly.
- Property requirements for representatives were set up.
- New voting requirements. Voters born after 1840 had to pass a literacy test and meet certain property requirements. However, the property qualifications for both voters and representatives were repealed by the Legislature in 1874.

== Influence ==
The 1864 constitution was used as a basis for the Constitution of Tonga adopted in 1875. Shirley Waldemar Baker, an Australian missionary in Tonga, obtained a copy of the Hawaiian constitution from Edward Reeve, a representative of the Hawaiian government.
