= Kamehameha V =

King of Hawaii from 1863 to 1872

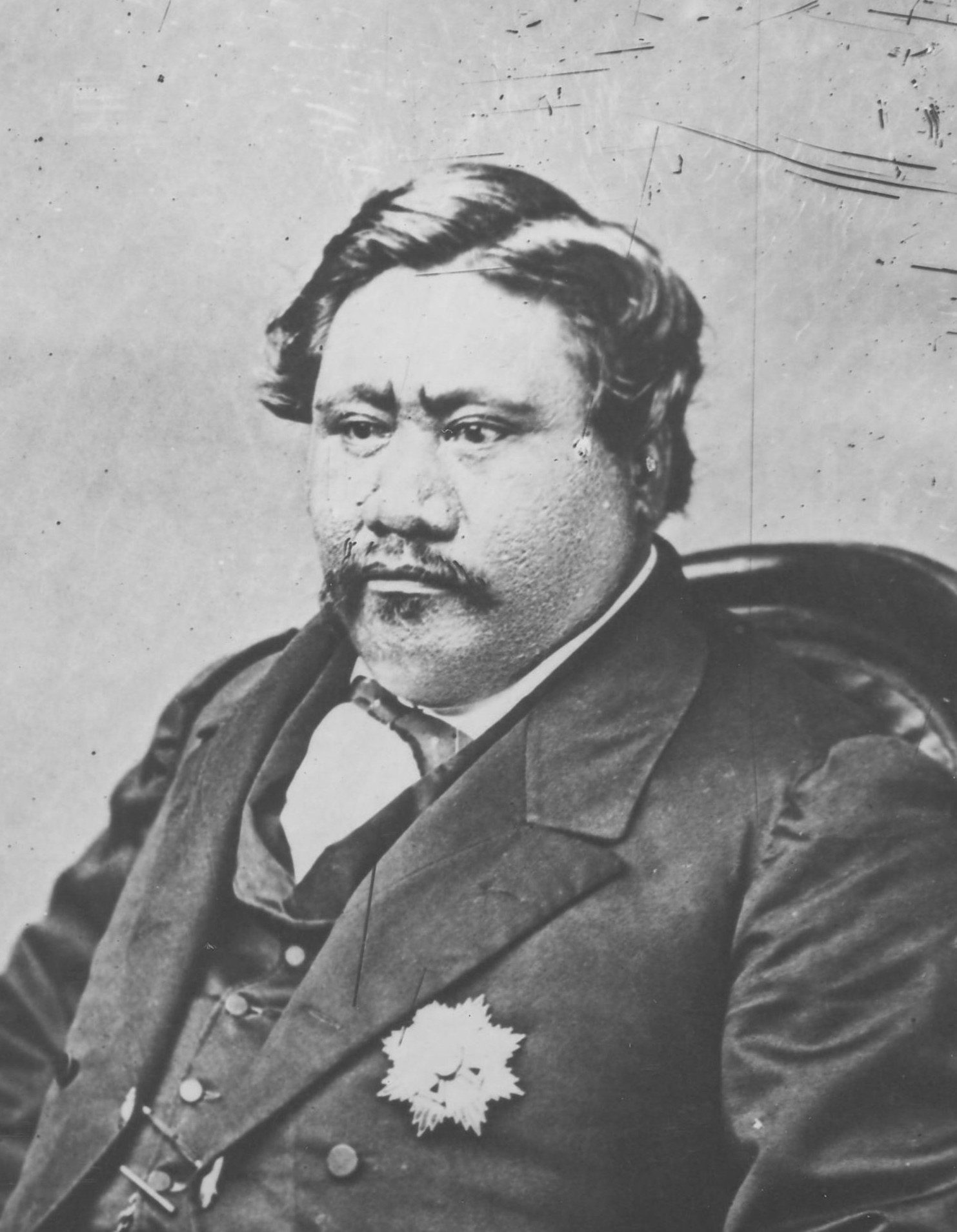
- Photograph c. 1865

King of the Hawaiian Islands
- Reign: November 30, 1863 – December 11, 1872
- Predecessor: Kamehameha IV
- Successor: Lunalilo
- Kuhina Nui: Victoria Kamāmalu, Kaʻahumanu IV; Kekūanaōʻa

Kuhina Nui of the Hawaiian Islands
- Reign: September 5 – September 14, 1853
- Predecessor: Keoni Ana
- Successor: Keoni Ana
- Monarch: Kamehameha III
- Born: Lot Kapuāiwa; December 11, 1830; Honolulu, Oahu
- Died: December 11, 1872 (aged 42); Honolulu, Oahu
- Burial: January 11, 1873; Mauna ʻAla Royal Mausoleum
- Issue: Keanolani (illegitimate)
Names
- Lota (Lot) Kapuāiwa Kalanimakua Aliʻiōlani Kalanikupuapaʻīkalaninui
- House: House of Kamehameha
- Father: Kekūanaōʻa; Ulumāheihei Hoapili (hānai)
- Mother: Kīnaʻu; Nāhiʻenaʻena (hānai); Kalākua Kaheiheimālie (hānai)
- Religion: Church of Hawaii

Kamehameha V (Lota Kapuāiwa Kalanimakua Aliʻiōlani Kalanikupuapaʻīkalaninui; December 11, 1830 – December 11, 1872), reigned as the fifth monarch of the Kingdom of Hawaiʻi from 1863 until his death in 1872. His motto was "Onipaʻa": immovable, firm, steadfast, or determined; he is said to have worked diligently for his people and kingdom, being described as the last great traditional chief.

== Early life ==
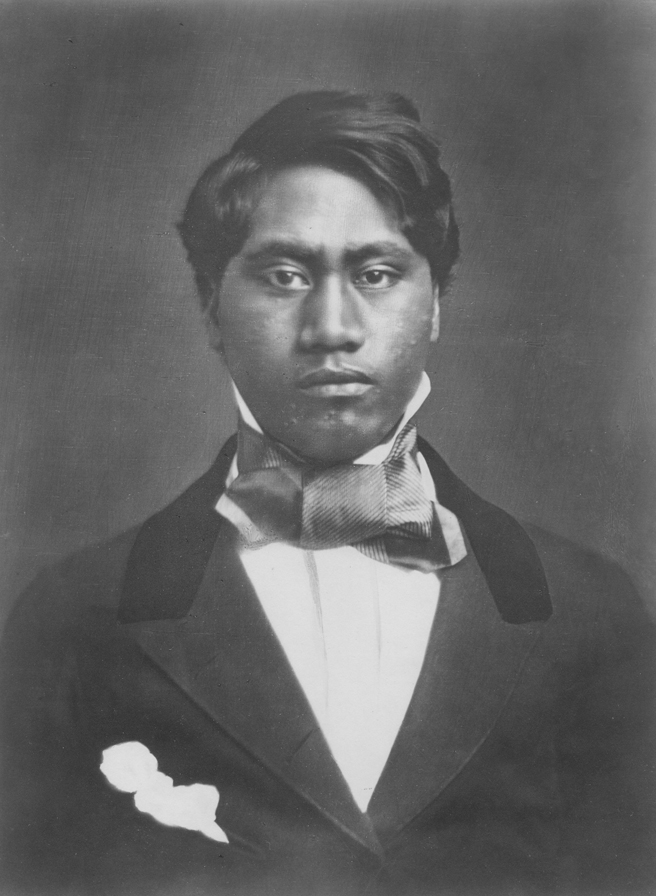
Prince Lot Kapuāiwa, traveling abroad in 1850.

He was born and given the name Lot Kapuāiwa on December 11, 1830. His mother was Elizabeth Kīnaʻu and father was Mataio Kekūanaōʻa. His siblings included David Kamehameha, Moses Kekūāiwa, Alexander Liholiho, and Victoria Kamāmalu. He also was a grandson of Kamehameha I. Kapu āiwa means 'mysterious kapu', or 'sacred one protected by supernatural powers'. He was adopted using the ancient Hawaiian tradition called hānai by Princess Nāhiʻenaʻena, but she died in 1836. He was then adopted by his grandmother Queen Kalākua Kaheiheimālie and step-grandfather High Chief Ulumāheihei Hoapili. His childhood was difficult; he felt that his hānai parents treated him as a stranger in their house, and that the adoption had deprived him the love of his mother. Throughout his life he would have a deep dislike for this tradition, as later seen by his anger at his half-sister Ruth Keelikolani after she gave away her second son Keolaokalani to Bernice Pauahi Bishop.

It was planned that he would be Hoapili's heir as Governor of Maui, although this never happened. Since King Kamehameha III declared him eligible for the throne, he was educated at the Royal School like his cousins and siblings. He was betrothed to Bernice Pauahi at birth, but she chose to marry American Charles Reed Bishop instead.

After leaving school, he traveled abroad with his brother Alexander Liholiho. With the supervision of their guardian Dr. Judd, Lot and his brother sailed to San Francisco in September 1849. After their tour of California, they continued on to Panama, Jamaica, New York City and Washington, D.C. They toured Europe and met with various heads of state including French president Louis Napoleon, British prince consort Albert, and US president Zachary Taylor and vice president Millard Fillmore.

== Career ==
Before becoming king, he served on the Privy Council of State from 1852 to January 1855, in the House of Nobles from 1852 to 1862, and as Commissioner of Customs from October 5, 1853. He briefly served as Kuhina Nui from September 5 to September 14, 1853, after being appointed by Kamehameha III, before resigning ten days later. On January 1, 1855, he was appointed a general in the Hawaiian military. He was appointed Director of the Board of Education on July 1, 1855, and to the Code Commission in 1856. On June 6, 1856, he became acting Minister of Finance, serving until May 26, 1857. He was appointed Minister of the Interior on June 6, 1857, serving until November 30, 1863, and Chief Justice of the Supreme Court on June 10, 1857, serving until May 26, 1858. He was appointed to the Board of Health on August 3, 1859. His more charismatic younger brother Prince Alexander Liholiho was crowned to become the King Kamehameha IV in 1854.

On August 5, 1862, Lot was included in a proposed amendment to the 1852 Constitution of the Kingdom of Hawaii concerning the line of succession. Lot and his heirs, followed by his sister Princess Victoria and her heirs, would succeed in the case his brother died without any legitimate heirs. The proposed change was made shortly before the death of Prince Albert Kamehameha, the only son of Kamehameha IV, on August 23, 1862. Under Article 105 of the Constitution, however, a proposed amendment had to be approved by a subsequent legislature before becoming part of the Constitution. Kamehameha IV died on November 30, 1863, before the amendment could be considered by the subsequent legislature.

== New constitution and new laws ==
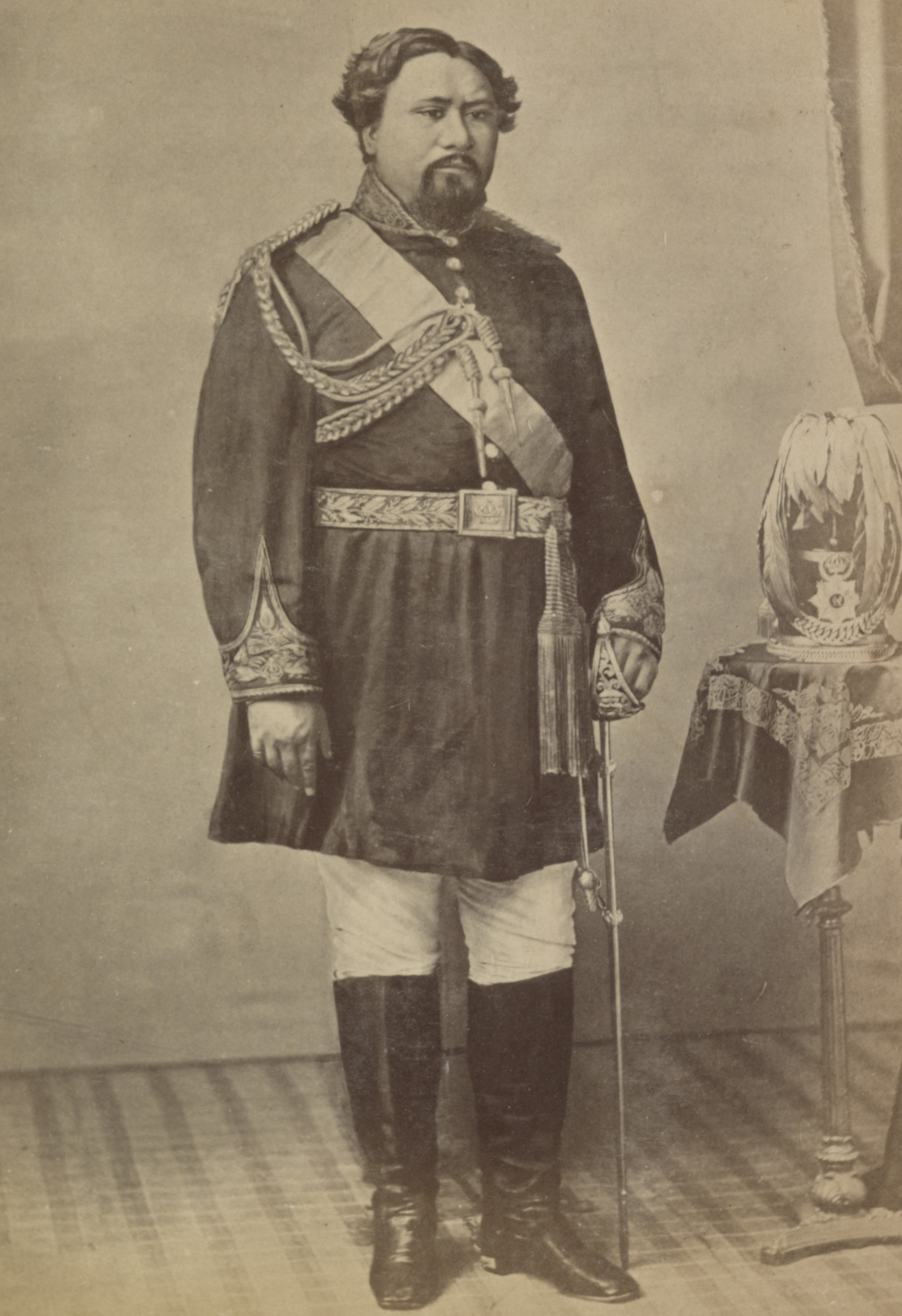
Kamehameha V in military uniform, c. 1865

He came to power on November 30, 1863, after his brother's death, but refused to uphold the previous constitution of 1852. He objected, in particular, to that constitution's grant of universal male suffrage in elections for the lower House of Representatives. In May 1864 he called for a constitutional convention. On July 7, 1864, he proposed a new constitution rather than amending the old one. The convention ran smoothly until the 62nd article. It limited voters to being residents who passed a literacy test and possessed property or had income qualifications. On August 20, 1864, he signed the 1864 Constitution of the Kingdom of Hawaii and took an oath to protect it.

The constitution was based on the original draft, but 20 articles were deleted. When he appointed Charles de Varigny, a French national, as minister of finance in December 1863, Americans in Hawaiʻi were convinced that he had adopted an anti-American policy. In reality, his foreign policy remained the same. Later de Varigny became minister of foreign affairs from 1865 to 1869.

He was the first king to encourage revival of traditional practices. Under his reign, the laws against "kahunaism" were repealed. A Hawaiian Board of Medicine was established, with kahuna members, and la'au lapa'au or Hawaiian medicine was again practiced. He brought kahuna practitioners to Honolulu to document their remedies. He took a female kahuna Kamaipuʻupaʻa as a royal mistress.

In 1865, a bill was brought before the legislature giving foreign merchants the right to sell liquor directly to Native Hawaiians. Kamehameha V surprised supporters of the bill by refusing to grant his assent, saying: "I will never sign the death warrant of my people." Alcoholism was one of the many causes of the already declining population of the native Hawaiians.

== Growth in travel to Hawaii ==
Growth in travel to the islands increased during Kamehameha's reign. Mark Twain came in March 1866 aboard the merchantman Ajax. He stayed for four months under his real name, Samuel Clemens, writing letters back to the Sacramento Union describing the islands. Twain described the king:

He was a wise sovereign; he had seen something of the world; he was educated & accomplished, & he tried hard to do well by his people, & succeeded. There was no trivial royal nonsense about him; He dressed plainly, poked about Honolulu, night or day, on his old horse, unattended; he was popular, greatly respected, and even beloved.

Queen Victoria sent her second son Prince Alfred, Duke of Edinburgh on a state visit in 1869. He appealed to Kaiser Wilhelm I of Germany, who sent Henri Berger to organize the Royal Hawaiian Band, a gift of music from the king to his people.

== Succession ==
His sister and only named Heir Apparent to the throne, Crown Princess Victoria Kamāmalu, had died childless in 1866 and through the remainder of his reign, Kamehameha V did not name a successor. He died on December 11, 1872, while the preparations for his birthday celebration were underway. As Lot lay bedstricken, he answered those that came to visit him: "It is hard to die on my birthday, but God's will be done". He offered the throne to his cousin Bernice Pauahi Bishop who refused, and died an hour later without designating an heir. Lot Kapuāiwa had a daughter Keanolani (July 7, 1847 – June 30, 1902) with Abigail Maheha. However, her illegitimate birth prevented her from succeeding to the Hawaiian throne. Lot was buried in the Royal Mausoleum of Hawaii at Mauna ʻAla.

He was the last ruling monarch of the House of Kamehameha styled under the Kamehameha name. Before his death Kamehameha V stated:

The throne belongs to Lunalilo; I will not appoint him, because I consider him unworthy of the position. The constitution, in case I make no nomination, provides for the election of the next King; let it be so.

With no heir at his death, the next monarch would be elected by the legislature. Kamehameha V's cousin William Charles Lunalilo, a Kamehameha by birth from his mother, demanded a general election and won. The legislature agreed and Lunalilo became the first elected king of the Hawaiian Kingdom.

== Legacy ==
He founded the Royal Order of Kamehameha I society on April 11, 1865, named to honor his grandfather.

The Prince Lot Hula Festival is named for him. It was held the third Saturday in July since 1977 at his former home called Moanalua Gardens.

In February 1847, a female student at the Royal School, Abigail Maheha, was expelled and wed in a hastily arranged marriage due to a scandalous pregnancy. Some speculate that the sixteen year-old Kamehameha V or his seventeen-year-old brother Moses Kekūāiwa was the father of Abigail's daughter Keanolani, who left living descendants. Evidence to support this claim include his financial support of Abigail's husband Keaupuni, veiled conversations the Cookes had with Abigail and Lot dated months before the pregnancy was discovered, and entries from the period which were torn out of his school journal.

== Family tree ==
Kamehameha family tree

Kalaniʻōpuʻu (k)	Kalola (w)	Keōua (k)	Kekuʻiapoiwa II (w)	Kānekapōlei (w)
Kīwalaʻō	Kekuiapoiwa Liliha
Keōpūolani	Kamehameha I (The Great) (died 1819)	Kalākua Kaheiheimālie	Kaʻahumanu (1819–1832)
Liholiho; Kamehameha II (1819–1824)	Kamāmalu	Keouawahine	Pauli Kaʻōleiokū _{*Paternity is in question as daughter and mother both claim Kalaniopuu as the father.}	Kahailiopua; Luahine
Kauikeaouli; Kamehameha III (1825–1854)	Kalama	Elizabeth Kīnaʻu; Kaʻahumanu II	Mataio; Kekūanaōʻa	Pauahi	Laura Kōnia	Abner Pākī
Keaweaweʻulaokalani I	Keaweaweʻulaokalani II
Queen Emma	Alexander Liholiho; Kamehameha IV (1854–1863)	Lot Kapuāiwa; Kamehameha V (1863–1872)	Victoria Kamāmalu; Kaʻahumanu IV (1855–1863)	Ruth Keʻelikōlani	Charles Reed; Bishop	Bernice Pauahi; Bishop
Albert Kamehameha	John William Pitt Kīnaʻu	Keolaokalani Davis

== Honors ==
- Kingdom of Hawaii: Founder of the Order of Kamehameha I, April 11, 1865
- Mexican Empire: Grand Cross of the Order of Guadalupe, 1865
- Grand Duchy of Hesse: Grand Cross of the Order of Philip the Magnanimous, December 1, 1869

== Bibliography ==
- Comeau, Rosalin Uphus (1996). Kamehameha V: Lot Kapuāiwa. Honolulu: Kamehameha Schools Press. ISBN 978-0-87336-039-5. OCLC 34752213.
- Kanahele, George S. (1999). Emma: Hawaii's Remarkable Queen. Honolulu: University of Hawaii Press. ISBN 978-0-8248-2240-8. OCLC 40890919.
- Kanahele, George S. (2002) [1986]. Pauahi: The Kamehameha Legacy. Honolulu: Kamehameha Schools Press. ISBN 978-0-87336-005-0. OCLC 173653971.
- Kuykendall, Ralph Simpson (1965) [1938]. The Hawaiian Kingdom 1778–1854, Foundation and Transformation. Vol. 1. Honolulu: University of Hawaii Press. ISBN 0-87022-431-X. OCLC 47008868.
- Kuykendall, Ralph Simpson (1953). The Hawaiian Kingdom 1854–1874, Twenty Critical Years. Vol. 2. Honolulu: University of Hawaii Press. ISBN 978-0-87022-432-4. OCLC 47010821.
- Liliuokalani (1898). Hawaii's Story by Hawaii's Queen, Liliuokalani. Boston: Lee and Shepard. ISBN 978-0-548-22265-2. OCLC 2387226.

Royal titles
Preceded by Kamehameha IV	King of Hawaiʻi; 1863–1872	Succeeded by Lunalilo
Preceded by Keoni Ana	Kuhina Nui of the Hawaiian Islands; September 5 – September 14, 1853	Succeeded by Keoni Ana
