= Moanalua Gardens =

Park in Honolulu, Hawaii, US

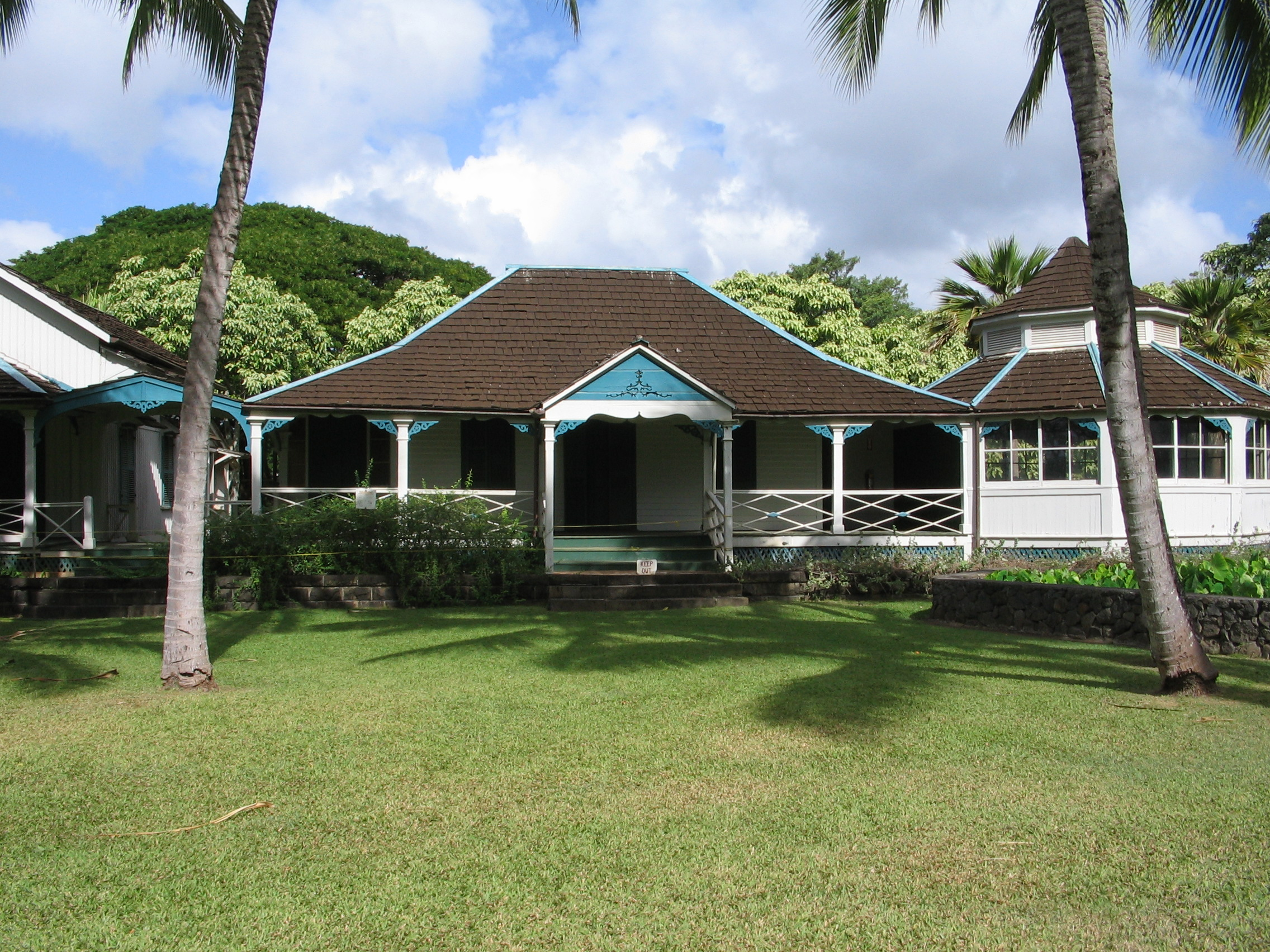
The Kamehameha V cottage, later used by Samuel Mills Damon

Moanalua Gardens is a 24-acre (97,000 m^{2}) privately owned public park in Honolulu, Hawaii. The park is the site of the Kamehameha V Cottage which used to be the home of Prince Lot Kapuāiwa, who would later become King Kamehameha V. It is also the site of the annual Prince Lot Hula Festival, and the home of a large monkeypod tree that is known in Japan as the Hitachi tree.

== The gardens ==
The gardens are located just off Interstate H-201 in the Moanalua district near Tripler Army Medical Center at 21°20′52″N 157°53′33″W. Once owned and operated by the estate of local businessman and landowner Samuel Mills Damon (1841–1924), the garden was bought by Kaimana Ventures, whose president John Philip Damon is a great-grandson of Samuel Damon.

=== Kamehameha V Cottage ===
The Kamehameha V Cottage, located at the western end of the garden, was originally built in the 1850s by Prince Lot Kapuāiwa, who would later become King Kamehameha V. The three separate units of the cottage (a kitchen and dining room unit, a living room/bedroom unit, and an entertainment unit) are connected via a series of roofed porches.

Princess Bernice Pauahi Bishop willed the cottage, along with the rest of the ahupuaʻa (traditional land division) of Moanalua to Damon when she died in 1884. Damon renovated the cottage and used it as a residence. The cottage was moved to its present location in 1960; it had been in three locations in Moanalua before then.

=== Hitachi tree ===
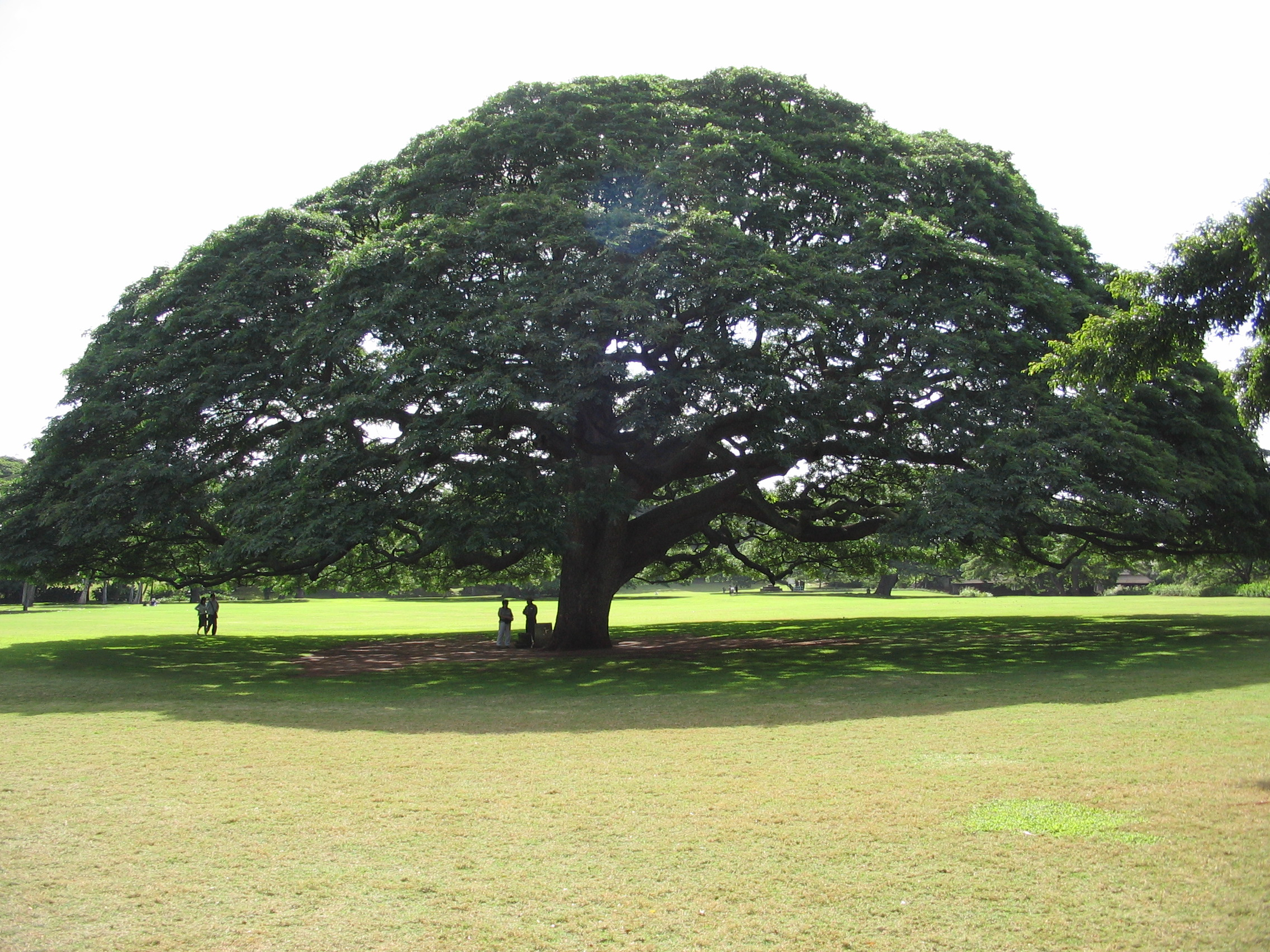
The Hitachi tree

The Hitachi tree, a large monkeypod tree with a distinctive umbrella-shaped canopy, grows in the middle of a grassy area in the middle of the park. The tree is registered as an exceptional tree by the City and County of Honolulu and cannot be removed or destroyed without city council approval.

Japanese electronics manufacturer Hitachi, Ltd. has used the tree as a corporate symbol since 1973. An agreement between the Damon Estate and Hitachi gave Hitachi exclusive worldwide rights to use the tree's image for promotional purposes in exchange for annual payments of US$20,000. The status of the agreement was called into question when the Damon Estate was dissolved after the last remaining grandchild died in 2004. Hitachi negotiated with the new owner and reached an agreement with Kaimana Ventures in December 2006 where Hitachi paid US$400,000 annually for promotional rights until 2016. The revenue from Hitachi was expected to defray the US$600,000 annual expenses for the park. After the expiration of that agreement, it was renewed in a deal "similar to a previous[] ten-year pact."
