= 1852 Constitution of the Hawaiian Kingdom =

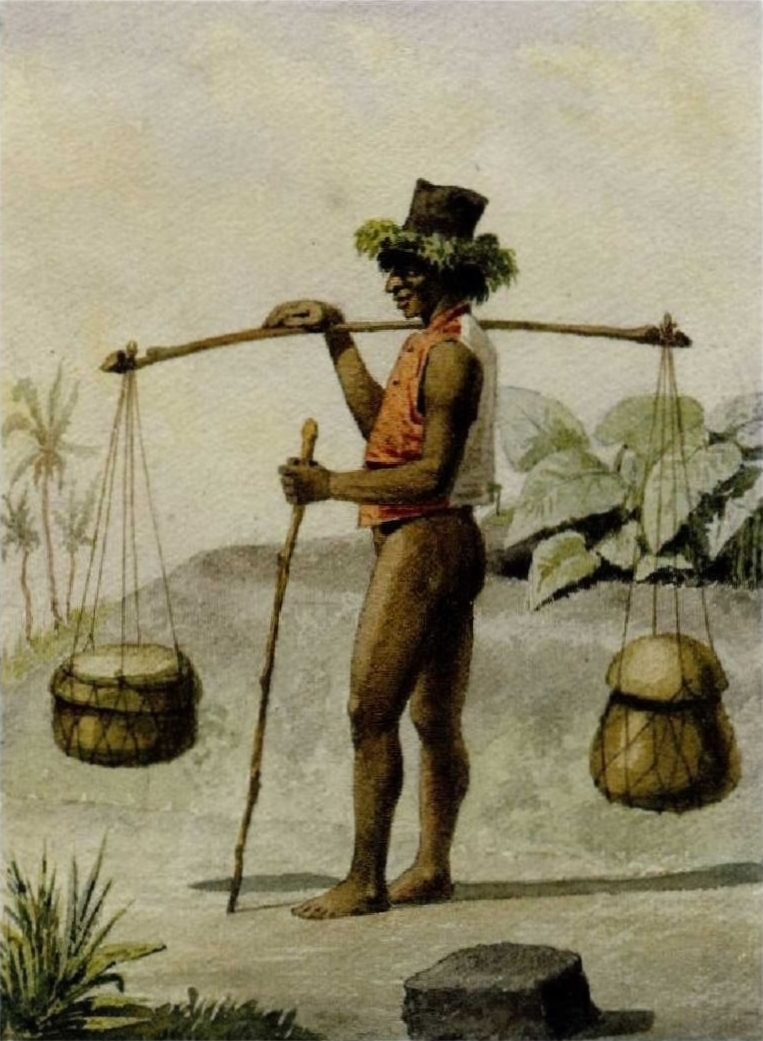
Man of the Hawaiian Islands, 1852. This picture depicts a man carrying an aumaka (pole), bearing the burden of balancing calabashes holding poi, vegetable, fowl, or pork for sale. This was a common sight to see on the islands at this time in history.

The 1852 Constitution of the Hawaiian Kingdom, written in both English and Hawaiian, was constructed by King Kamehameha III. The purpose of its construction was to not only revise, but add to the 1840 Constitution in great length. The new constitution created a more democratic government much like those of the United States and Europe.

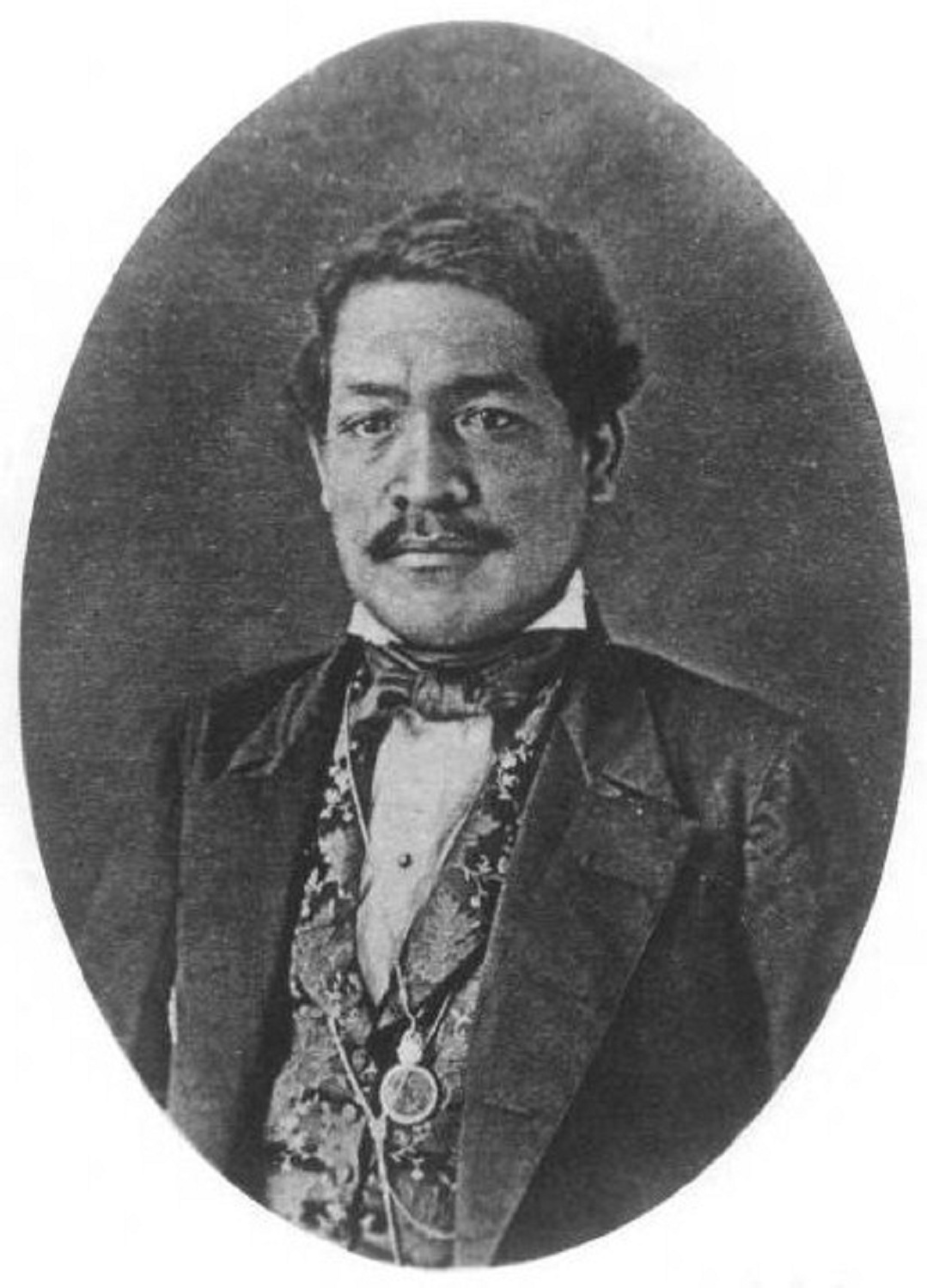
King Kamehameha III

== King Kamehameha III ==
The writer of the Hawaiian Constitution of 1852 was Kauikeaouli, referred to by the Hawaiian public as King Kamehameha III. He was the successor of Liholiho, King Kamehameha II. Kauikeaouli was the brother of Liholio and son of Kamehameha I. Kauikeaouli took over the throne at age eleven under the "regency" of his mother Ka'ahumanu. Kauikeaouli enacted the first constitution of Hawaii in 1840 which created a more western-like government with a two-body legislature. This was later revised in 1852. King Kamehameha III was the first Hawaiian monarch to rule as a "constitutional monarch" rather than an absolute monarch like his predecessors. This means he ruled in accordance with the sovereign people and a constitution declaring their rights.

== Transition from 1840 Constitution to 1852 Constitution ==
The 1840 constitution was the first written constitution of the Hawaiian Kingdom and was heavily influenced by Europeans and Americans living on the Island and especially by Protestant missionaries who had arrived in 1820. It created two houses; the House of Nobles and House of Representatives. It also created a judicial branch similar to the one used in the continental U.S., which established a supreme court of which the king would be the chief judge. This first written constitution did effectively split the government in a European fashion, however it was very general. It contained nothing about foreign affairs or even civil affairs regarding land rights and organization of the communities. Because of the notable gaps becoming evident in the existing constitution, King Kamehameha III and the Hawaiian Kingdom Legislature picked three commissioners to revise the constitution of 1840. One commissioner was chosen by the King, one by the House of Nobles, and one by the House of Representatives. These commissioners were given the daunting task of revising the constitution and in doing so, practically rewrote it.

The new Constitution contained 106 sections. This was a major increase from the 47 that made up the previous constitution. The 1852 version created a much more specific Declaration of Rights than the previous. This helped to clearly outline the rights of the people in regards to land and the organization of communities which solved the confusion left unaddressed in the 1840 edition. The new constitution also served to declare freedom from servitude for all adult males. It also restructured the House of Nobles so that the members were no longer determined by heredity, but were rather appointed for life by the King. The delegated powers of the Legislative, Judicial, and Executive (Monarchy) branches of the Hawaiian government were also specified.

== The Constitution of 1852 ==
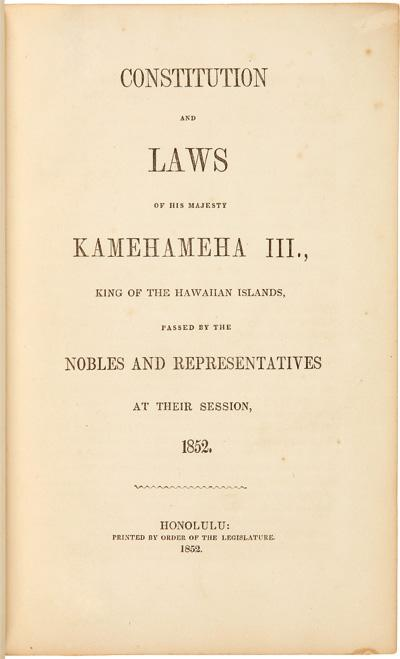
The title page of the English edition.

The Constitution of 1852 served as the Constitution of the Hawaiian Kingdom from 1852 through 1864. It heavily liberalized the structure of the Hawaiian government compared to the previous 1840 constitution, introducing new elements of democracy into the government and reducing the influence of the monarch in kingdom affairs.

The 1852 Constitution of the Kingdom of Hawaiʻi was divided into seven parts.

The seven parts were:

1. Declaration of Rights

2. Form of Government

3. Of the Executive Power

a. Section I: The King, His Prerogatives
b. Section II: Of the Kuhina Nui
c. Section III: Of the Privy Council
d. Section IV: Of the King's Ministers
e. Section V: Of the Governors

4. Of the Legislative Power

a. Of the House of Nobles
b. Of the House of Representatives

5. Of the Judiciary

6. General Provisions

7. More Amending of the Constitution

The Declaration of Rights stated that the Hawaiians were a free people.

The Form of Government stated that Hawaiʻi was a Constitutional Monarchy.

The section "Of the Executive Power" declared the powers of the executive power.

The section "Of the Legislative Power" declared the powers of the legislative power.

The section "Of the Judiciary" declared the powers of the judiciary.

The General Provisions stated anything unmentioned earlier besides the amending power.

The final section allowed for amending of the constitution.

== The Amendment of 1856 ==
An amendment to the constitution of 1852 was proposed during the legislative session in the year 1855. It was ratified on September 15, 1856. The amendment contained eight articles. The primary focus of the amendment was to allow the legislature to meet biennially rather than annually.

Article 1 changed the 27th article of the constitution but only in the native language. One word was changed.

Article 2 amended the 29th article of the constitution. The 29th article of the constitution allowed the king to convene the legislature at the seat of the government or at a different location if safety was an issue. It also allowed the king to adjourn the legislature for up to one year in case of a disagreement between the two houses or with the king himself. Under the new amendment, the king had the discretion to adjourn the legislature for up to two years.

Article 3 amended the 32nd article of the constitution to remove the King's power to appoint the head of any executive office. The amended article would now only give the King the authority to remove the head of an executive office as well as to demand written information from any department head or officer regarding the oversight of their office.

Article 4 amended the 43rd article of the constitution. The original constitution stated that any Chief of Rank as appointed by the King would have the title "highness". The amendment removed this title and instead declared that any Chief of Rank would be known by their birth title or any other title the King gave them.

Article 5 amended the 54th article of the constitution. Article 5 of the 1856 amendment changed the requirement of each governmental department to report its transactions and business. The reports were now due by the start of each new fiscal year rather than just being a general annual requirement.

Article 6 amended the 61st article of the constitution. Under the amendment, the legislature was only required to meet on behalf of the welfare of the nation biannually rather than annually as previously defined by the constitution. This biannual convention would be held when and where the king dictated.

Article 6 amended the 99th article of the constitution. Under the new amendment the legislature would vote every two years on the appropriations based on an analysis of the previous two years revenue and spending as well as the projected revenue and spending of the next two years as given by the finance minister.

Article 8 amended the 72nd article of the constitution. The amendment addressed the possibility of members of the House of Nobles being able to resign from their position. Under the amendment the king would appoint members of the House of Nobles who would hold their seats for life except in cases of resignation. Members of the House of Nobles were subject to provisions stated in article 67 of the constitution and there would be a maximum of 30 members allowed.

== Transition from 1852 Constitution to 1864 Constitution ==
The constitution of 1852 lasted through the reign of King Kamehameha III and King Kamehameha IV. When King Kamehameha IV died in 1863, King Kamehameha V resumed power but refused to endorse the constitution of 1852. King Kamehameha V despised the liberal nature of the 1852 constitution and wanted to restore power to the monarchy. He gathered a small group of delegates consisting of chiefs from the House of Nobles, some common citizens, and some missionaries to assemble a convention to re-write the constitution. Members at the convention refused to ratify the new constitution, so King Kamehameha V dismissed them and implemented the new constitution himself. The constitution of 1864 expanded the powers of the king, created a unicameral legislature, restricted freedom of the press, weakened the judicial, and discriminated against the poor through the institution of a property requirement for people to vote or serve in the legislature. The new constitution of 1864 contained 80 articles compared to the 106 articles in the constitution of 1852.
