= 1840 Constitution of the Hawaiian Kingdom =

Hawaiian-language basic law of the kingdom of Hawaii

The 1840 Constitution of the Hawaiian Kingdom titled Ke Kumukānāwai a me nā Kānāwai o ko Hawaiʻi Pae ʻĀina, 1840 was the first fully written constitution for the Hawaiian Kingdom. Overall, this version of the Constitution of Hawaiʻi established a constitutional monarchy subjecting even the king to certain principles of democracy.

== Background ==
By the late 1830s, the Hawaiian Kingdom was undergoing a profound spiritual and structural transformation. King Kamehameha III and the aliʻi families had deeply embraced Christianity, viewing its moral and ethical principles as the rightful foundation for their changing society. Recognizing that early oral customs and a disorganized penal system—which relied heavily on unmonitored exile—were no longer sufficient, Hawaiian leadership sought to codify their personal faith into written law. Simultaneously, foreign powers were utilizing the lack of a Western-style legal code to threaten Hawaii's sovereignty. In response, the King and aliʻi proactively drafted the 1840 Constitution. Far from a mere mechanism of foreign control, this foundational document was a deliberate expression of the rulers' Christian conviction, explicitly declaring that all human rights come from God and establishing a balanced, modern legal framework designed to protect the independence of the Hawaiian Kingdom.

== Overview ==
The constitution was enacted on October 8, 1840, by King Kamehameha III and Kekāuluohi as Kuhina Nui, an office similar to Prime Minister or co-regent. The constitution, compared to its predecessor, was extremely detailed. The June 7, 1839, document, sometimes called a constitution but more similar to a declaration of rights, stated simply that the government was based on Christian values and equality for all. Incorporating the 1839 document, the 1840 Constitution of the Kingdom of Hawai’i was a turning point in Hawai’i government.

This constitution organized the power of government and its functions by defining the House of Representatives as the legislative body, giving their people the power to vote, proclaiming the House of Kamehameha, establishing of the office of Kuhina Nui, creating of the office of royal governors of the various islands and recognizing Christianity as an authority.

== Amendments ==
It could be changed by section 13, which gave the House of Nobles and the House of Representatives the ability to change the constitution.
