= Ralph Simpson Kuykendall =

American historian

Ralph Simpson Kuykendall (April 12, 1885 – May 9, 1963) was an American historian who served as the trustee and secretary of the Hawaiian Historical Society from 1922 to 1932. Kuykendall also served as professor of history at the University of Hawaii at Manoa. He is most noted as a historian of the Hawaiian Islands, South Pacific, and Pacific Northwest.

== Early life ==
Kuykendall was born in Linden, California. His parents Reverend John Wesley Kuykendall and Marilla Persis Pierce were both Methodist missionaries and descendants of Dutch settlers from New York. In 1919 Kuykendall married Edith Clare Kelly from Hollister, California. They had two sons, John Richard Kuykendall and Delman Leur Kuykendall.

Kuykendall attended California's College of the Pacific where he was active in campus life as a debater, editor of the college newspaper, and student body president. He graduated in 1910 with a Bachelor of Arts degree. Following his graduation from 1911 to 1912, Kuykendall taught at College Park Academy and started his graduate studies in history at Stanford University. After a year of study, Kuykendall took a break and moved to Florida to work with his brother at a newspaper. In 1916 Kuykendall returned to California to work as a field research agent for the California Historical Survey Commission. He apparently succeeded at collecting and assessing the material he obtained in the field and compiling his results into cohesive works.

Kuykendall had resumed his post-graduate work at the University of California at Berkeley. In 1919 Kuykendall completed his M.A. thesis entitled History of Early California Journalism. He had intended to complete his doctorate when he was again awarded the Native Sons of the Golden West fellowship to do research in the Archives of Seville, Spain. While in Spain, Kuykendall was tapped to be the executive secretary of the newly established Hawaiian Historical Commission. He left Spain in 1922.

== Professional life ==
Ralph Kuykendall arrived in Honolulu, Hawaii on June 19, 1922. As executive secretary of the Hawaiian Historical Commission, Kuykendall was expected to research and complete three historical works. The first was a school textbook on Hawaiian history. The second was a history on Hawaii's role in World War I. And the third was a comprehensive and authoritative history of the Hawaiian people. Kuykendall mostly relied upon the historical collections at the Territorial Archives, the Library of Hawaii and other museums. Earlier histories were written from the perspectives of missionaries, traders, or foreign governments. Kuykendall wanted to incorporate all of these perspectives.

Kuykendall's first book, A History of Hawaii, was approved by the Hawaii State Legislature in 1925. It was co-authored with the help of Dr. Herbert E. Gregory who served as the Director of the Bernice P. Bishop Museum. A History of Hawaii documents the early beginnings of the Hawaiian kingdom to United States territory. The year 1926 marked its first use in Hawaii classrooms.

The second book, titled Hawaii in the World War, was co-authored with Lorin Tarr Gill. Published in 1928, Hawaii in the World War details the territory's military and domestic involvement in the war.

The final, third book, an accurate history of the Hawaiian people, was by far the most difficult to complete. The work was to be a narrative history divided into three sections; 1) ancient history prior to 1778, 2) Hawaiian monarchy from 1778 through the overthrow of 1893, 3) the transition from provisional government to republic to territory. Kuykendall drew largely from the archives of Washington D.C., the Oregon Historical Society, British Columbia, Harvard College Library, Washington State archives, the Mormon archives in Salt Lake City, Bancroft Library, and the California State Library. He also acquired new collections of documents, newspapers, periodicals, books, and manuscripts.

In 1923 Kuykendall accepted a position as history professor at the University of Hawaii in Manoa. Kuykendall continued to serve as the executive secretary of the Hawaiian Historical Commission until its dissolution in 1932. He published a few more books, including the trilogy The Hawaiian Kingdom. Volume 1: Foundation and Transformation, 1778-1854, published 1938 is about the formation of the Hawaiian Islands under a single kingdom and the development of the Hawaiian nation. The book spans the first half of the Kamehameha Dynasty; Kamehameha I, Kamehameha II, Kamehameha III. Volume 2: Twenty Critical Years, 1854-1874, published 1953, is about the "middle period" after the establishment of the Kingdom. It is about international relations, immigration, changing economics and society. Kuykendall described this period as "neglected" by academics. The book spans the last half of the Kamehameha Dynasty; Kamehameha IV, Kamehameha V, and Lunalilo and his brief dynasty. Volume 3: The Kalakaua Dynastism, 1874-1893, published 1967, is about the decline of the Kingdom, Reciprocity Treaty of 1875, and eventual overthrow. The book spans the Kalākaua Dynasty; Kalākaua, Liliʻuokalani. Volume 3 was one of Kuykendall's posthumous publications. Also, in 1948, Ralph Kuykendall and A. Grove Day published Hawaii: A History From Polynesian Kingdom to American Statehood.

Kuykendall was diagnosed with cancer in the early 1960s and he moved to Tucson, Arizona to live with his son. Kuykendall continued to work up until his death in 1963; he left several unfinished manuscripts. The University of Hawaii at Manoa named the building in which the English Department resides after Kuykendall.

== Bibliography for Ralph S. Kuykendall ==
1919 History of Early California Journalism. (M.A. Thesis, University of California.)

1919 A California State Rights Editor, The Grizzly Bear, XXIV, No. 3, Whole No. 141. (January, 1919)

1919 Genesis of the Alta California, The Grizzly Bear, XXIV, Whole No. 143 and 144. (March and April, 1919).

1919 Early History of Yosemite Valley, The Grizzly Bear, XXV, No. 2, Whole No. 146. (June, 1919). Reprinted in pamphlet form as a Bulletin of the National Park Service. (Washington, D.C.., 1919, 12 p.)

1921 History of the Yosemite Region, Handbook of Yosemite National Park, compiled by Ansel F. Hall (New York, G.P. Putnam’s Sons, 1921.) pp. 3-47

1922 An American Ship-Builder for Spanish California, Hispanic American Historical Review, V:90-92 (February 1922)

1923 Report of the Historical Commission for the period ending Dec. 31. 1992. Honolulu, 1923. 19p. (Publications of the Historical Commission of the Territory of Hawaii, Vol. I, No. 1

1923 A Northwest Trader at the Hawaiian Islands, Quarterly of the Oregon Historical Society, XXIV:111-131. (June, 1923)

1923 New Light on relations between Kaumualii…and Kamehameha…, Paradise of the Pacific (August 1923)

1924 James Colnett and the Princess Royal, Quarterly of the Oregon Historical Society, XXV:26-53 (March, 1924)

1924 An Hawaiian in Mexico in 1789-1790, Thirty-Second Annual Report of the Hawaiian Historical Society, pp. 37–50. (Honolulu 1924)

1925 Report of the Historical Commission for the two years ending Dec. 31, 1924. Honolulu, 1925. 49 p. (Publications of the Historical Commission of the Territory of Hawaii, Vol. I, No. 2.) (Documents included: An American Diplomat in Hawaii; The Policy of Great Britain toward the Hawaiian Islands, 1824-1854)

1926 How an American Official Proposed to Save Hawaii from the French in 1851, Honolulu Advertiser, May 16, 1926.

1926 Story of Mormon Settlement on Lanai, Honolulu Star-Bulletin, June 24, 1926,

1926 Hawaiian Diplomatic Correspondence in the ... Archives of the Department of State, Washington, D.C. (Publications of the Historical Commission of the Territory of Hawaii, Vol. I, No. 3, 1926. 56p.)

1926 A History of Hawaii. New York, the Macmillan Company, 1926. x, 375 p. (Three introductory chapters by H.E. Gregory) Reprinted in 1933.

1927 Report of the Historical Commission for the two years ending Dec. 31, 1926. Honolulu, 1927. 57 p. (Publications of the Historical Commission of the Territory of Hawaii, Vol. I, No. 4.) (Documents included: Secret Instructions to Lord Byron, Sept. 14, 1824; Politics in Hawaii in 1853; British Influence in Hawaii during the Reigns of Kamehameha IV and Kamehameha V)

1928 Hawaii in World War I. Honolulu, 1928. xix, 474 p. (Publications of the Historical Commission ... Vol. II. In collaboration with Lorin Tarr Gill; Kuykendall wrote independently somewhat more than half the book and planned and edited the whole.)

1928 Articles in Dictionary of American Biography on Henry E. Cooper, Sanford B. Dole, Gerrit P. Judd, Jonah K. Kalanianaole, William Richards, and Lorrin A Thurston.

1929 Report of the Historical Commission for the two years ending Dec. 31, 1928. Honolulu, 1929. 57 p. (Publications of the Historical Commission ... Vol. I, No. 5) (Documents included: Hawaii in 1844; The Reign of Lunalilo and the Election of Kalakaua.)

1929 Some Early Commercial Adventures of Hawaii, Thirty-Seventh Annual Report of the Hawaiian Historical Society, pp. 15–33. (Honolulu, 1929)

1930 The Hawaiian Islands ... Papers read during the Captain Cook sesquicentennial celebration, Honolulu, August 17, 1928. Ed. By A.P. Taylor, and R.S. Kuykendall. Honolulu, 1930 93 p.

1931 American Interests and American Influence in Hawaii in 1842, Thirty-Ninth Annual Report of the Hawaiian Historical Society, pp. 48–67, (Honolulu, 1931)

1931 Albert Pierce Taylor, December 18, 1872 – January 12, 1931 (obituary) Thirty–Ninth Annual Report of the Hawaiian Historical Society, pp. 14 (Honolulu 1931)

1931 Who was Builder of the Kings’s Highway?, Honolulu Star-Bulletin, June 20, 1931,

1931 Education in the Hawaiian Islands prior to the Founding of Lahainaluna High School, Ka Lama Hawaii (Centennial Year Book of Lahainaluna High School), 1931, pp 53–58; The Friend, July 1931; and Hawaii Educational Review, XX: 60–63, 67 (November 1931)

1931 Two Neglected Graves, The Friend, July 1931.

1932 Historical Notes, Fortieth Annual Report of the Hawaiian Historical Society, pp. 34–42. (Honolulu, 1932)

1932 Report to Governor Lawrence M. Judd. Cited in full: Honolulu Star-Bulletin, March 7, 1932 (Study of Kuykendall on Morals of Hawaiians is Added to Judd’s Report) and Honolulu Advertiser, March 6, 1932 (Hawaiians Law Abiding Americans, Governor’s Answer to Naval Chief.)

1938 The Hawaiian Kingdom: 1778-1854: foundation and transformation. Honolulu, University of Hawaii Press, 1938. 310 p.

1940 Constitutions of the Hawaiian Kingdom: A Brief History and Analysis (Papers of the Hawaiian Historical Society, No. 21.) Honolulu, 1940. 60 p.

1941 Charles R. Bishop, ‘An Inside View of the Reign of Lunalilo.‘, ed. By Ralph S. Kuykendall. Forty-Ninth Annual Report of the Hawaiian Historical Society, pp. 12–28. (Honolulu, 1941)

1943 Negotiations of the Hawaiian Annexation Treaty of 1893. edited by R.S. Kuykendall Fifty-First Annual Report of the Hawaiian Historical Society, pp. 5–64, (Honolulu, 1943)

1943 Review of Harold Bradley’s The American Frontier in Hawaii, (Stanford University Press, 1942). Pacific Historical Review, (March 1943)

1946 Introduction of the Episcopal Church into the Hawaiian Islands, Pacific Historical Review, XV: 133–146. (June, 1946)

1948 Racial Aloha in Hawaii, by R.S. Kuykendall and A.G. Day, The Nation, 167: 185–186, August 14, 1948.

1949 Hawaii’s Racial Rainbow, by R.S. Kuykendall and A.G. Day. Paradise of the Pacific, v. 61, No. 2:15-16, 32, February 1949

1950 Review of Osgood Hardy and Glenn S. Dumke's A History of the Pacific in Modern Times (Houghton Mifflin, 1949). Pacific Historical Review, XIX: 193–195, May 1950.

1951 Destined to be an American Yankee Imperialism Absorbs the Legendary Isles. American Heritage, Vol. 2 No. 3, Spring 1951. (Also guest editor of Hawaiian Section, same issue)

1952 Review of Eugene Burns’ The Last King of Paradise. (Pellegrini and Cudahy, 1952). Pacific Historical Review, XXI: 297-298 (August 1952)

1953 The Hawaiian Kingdom: 1854-1874: Twenty Critical Years. Honolulu, University of Hawaii Press, 1953. 310 p.

1954 Review of Hilary Conroy's The Japanese Frontier in Hawaii, 1868–1898, (University of California Press, 1953). Pacific Historical Review, XXIII: 75–76. (February 1954)

1955 Local History Work in the Territory of Hawaii, History News, X: 38, 40. (August 1955)

1961 Hawaii: A History, From Polynesian Kingdom to American State. Revised Edition. By R.S. Kuykendall and A.G. Day. New York, Prentice Hall, 1961. x, 331 p.

1967 The Hawaiian Kingdom: 1874-1893: the Kalakaua Dynasty, Honolulu, University of Hawaii, 1967. viii, 764 p. (Completed by Dr. Charles Hunter.)

Letters to the Editor

1926 Further Comment on Portraits of Kamehameha I Honolulu Advertiser, Oct. 5, 1926, Editorial Page.

1940 How Much do You Know About Hawaiian History Honolulu Star-Bulletin, May 20, 1940, pp. 9.

1943 Work Progresses on Hawaii War Records Honolulu Star-Bulletin, Oct. 9, 1943, Editorial Page.
