= Education of Hawaiian Youths Abroad =

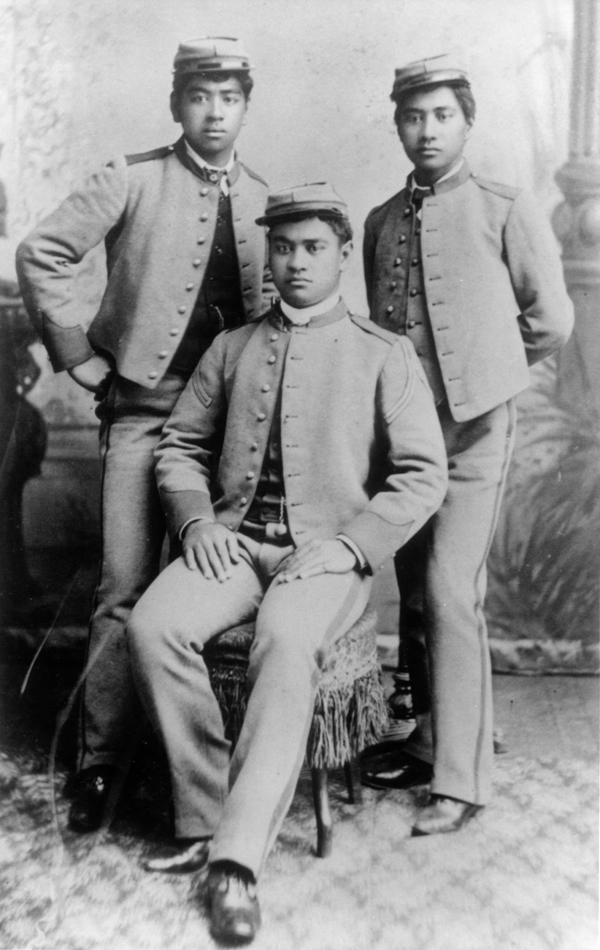
Nephews of King Kalākaua at Saint Matthew's Episcopal Day School in San Mateo, California. Left to right: Jonah Kūhiō Kalanianaʻole, David Kawānanakoa and Edward Abnel Keliʻiahonui

Education of Hawaiian Youths Abroad was a government-funded educational program that commenced April 1, 1880, during the reign of King Kalākaua, to help students further their educations beyond the institutions available in Hawaii at that time and to prepare and train them as future leaders of the Hawaiian Kingdom. Students were personally selected by Kalākaua, based upon family background and academic excellence. All living accommodations and expenses were taken care of for chosen students enrolled in a foreign university or apprenticed outside of the kingdom.

== History ==
The Education of Hawaiian Youths Abroad program began with the legislative assembly of 1880, when it was proposed by Robert Hoapili Baker, who was then in the lower house of the legislature of the kingdom, representing the Kona district of Oahu, and a supporter of Kalākaua. The program commenced April 1, 1880. Further appropriations for the program were $30,000 in 1882, $25,000 in 1884, and $30,000 in 1886, for an aggregate total of $100,000 investment in the program.

Between 1880 and 1887, five young Hawaiians, four boys and one girl, were sent to study in Italy. The first group of students were Robert Napuʻuako Boyd, Robert William Wilcox and James Kaneholo Booth, leaving Honolulu on August 30, 1880, under the guardianship of Celso Caesar Moreno. Kalākaua wanted them to be sent to a Prussian military academy; however, once in Prussia, Moreno decided the designated school did not have the structure Kalākaua had in mind. The three young men were eventually enrolled at three different academies in Livorno, Turin and Naples, respectively. On September 15, 1884, Booth died of cholera at his school. The second group of two students were sent to the Military Academy of Turin in 1887 to prepare for a career in the cultural arts. August Hering was a student in sculpture, while Maile Nowlein, daughter of Colonel Samuel Nowlein, studied art and music. Both were guests at Wilcox's wedding to Baronessa Gina Sobrero.

Three students were escorted to Glasgow, Scotland, by Charles Hastings Judd in 1882, and apprenticed at the Scotland Street Iron Works. One of them, Hugo Kawelo, returned to Hawaii in 1885, due to ill health. The other two, Henry Kapena and John Lovell were able to complete their apprenticeship in 1886, and secured positions in San Francisco. Kapena returned to Hawaii within months of arriving in San Francisco.

In 1882, Judd accompanied Joseph A. Kamauoha for his enrollment at King's College, London. He accompanied Matthew Makalua and Abraham Charles Piianaia to their enrollment at Denstone College. The three students were placed under the guardianship of Hawaii Consul-General Manley Hopkins, who sent regular detailed accounts to Kalākaua. Hopkins gave each student an allowance, and taught them how to manage a budget by requiring them to pay their own expenses out of the allowance. In 1886, Kamauoha succumbed to a lengthy illness thought to be the result of London's weather. Piianaia pursued studies in law, and was called home after the Bayonet Constitution was signed. He became principal of the Government English School at Ulupalakua, Maui. In 1890, he married Fanny Malulani, a student of St. Andrew's Priory School in Honolulu. A quilt made by students at St. Andrews Priory as a wedding present is in a collection at the Bishop Museum in Honolulu. Makalua married Annie Clementina Dewar in England and had a son. Manley was able to convince the Hawaiian government to allow Makalua to remain in London until he completed his medical studies in 1890. Makalua never returned to Hawaii, but remained in England and became a doctor.

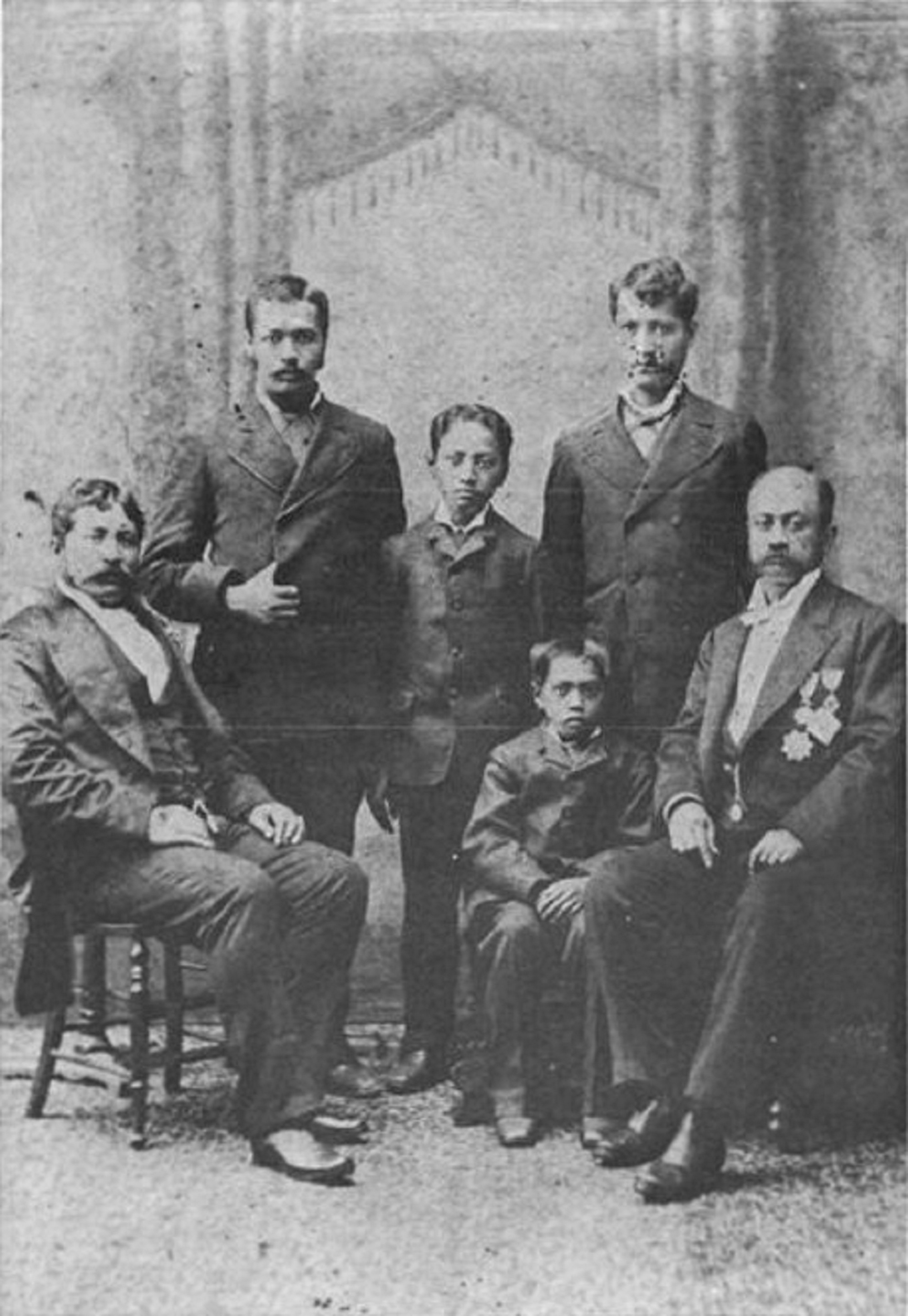
Seated left to right: John Lota Kaulukoʻu, James Haku'ole, and John Mākini Kapena. Standing left to right: unidentified man, Isaac Harbottle, and (probably) James Kapaʻa

In 1882, Judd enrolled Thomas Spencer at Saint Matthew's Episcopal Day School in San Mateo, California. In 1885, Thomas Pualii Cummins, son of John Adams Cummins, and the king's three nephews, David Kawānanakoa, Edward Abnel Keliʻiahonui, and Jonah Kūhiō Kalanianaʻole were also enrolled in the school. While at St. Matthews, Kūhiō and his brothers would travel south to Santa Cruz, where they demonstrated the Hawaiian sport of board surfing to the locals, becoming the first California surfers in 1885. Keliʻiahonui fell ill with typhoid fever in September 1887, and was immediately returned to Hawaii where he died on September 21. Henry Grube Marchant was sent to Boston in 1887 to study engraving.

Three youths were sent to China and Japan for Asian studies, but not a lot is recorded about them. James Kapaa studied in Canton, China from 1882 until his return to Hawaii in 1885. James Hakuole and Isaac Harbottle were sent to Japan in 1882 under the guardianship of R. W. Lewin. They became fluent in the Japanese language and immersed in the culture of Japan. In 1887 Lewin recommended both young men be enrolled in the Imperial Japanese Military University. The enrollment never happened, because they were called home after the Bayonet Constitution went into effect.

== End to Program ==
Funding for the program ended with the political upheaval following the signing of the Bayonet Constitution in 1887. Most of the students were recalled home to Hawaii. Unable to find work suited for their military training, Wilcox and Boyd, two of the most controversial returnees, participated in the unsuccessful Wilcox rebellion of 1889 aimed at restoring the constitution of 1864. Critics in the English press in Hawaii noted the insurrection as an example of the folly of the program. The last student to receive governmental funding, Makalua, stopped receiving aid after 1894.

== Legacy ==
The 1901 legislative session of Territory of Hawaii attempted to pass a bill by Representative Jonah Kumalae, to create a similar education program to send poor Hawaiian youths to the US mainland or aboard for education in top universities.

In 2018, the Native Hawaiian Student Services at the University of Hawaiʻi at Mānoa started a study abroad program led by Nalani Balutski. The program sponsored research study tours for University of Hawaiʻi at Mānoa students to London and Paris in 2018 and Italy and England in 2019.
