= Matthew Makalua =

First Native Hawaiian physician

Makalua in Derby, UK, from a cabinet card by W. W. Winter (c. 1884)

Matthew Everard Puakahakoililanimanui Makalua (11 April 1866 – 1 January 1929) was the first Native Hawaiian to study Western medicine. A cousin of Kapiʻolani, Makalua was sent to the United Kingdom to study at King's College London as part of the Hawaiian Youths Abroad initiative, a study abroad program promoted by Kalākaua and his supporters to educate future leaders of the Hawaiian Kingdom.

In 1887, when the Bayonet Constitution removed most of the power from the Hawaiian monarchy, the program was shut down. Most students returned home to the islands, but Makalua was allowed to continue his study, receiving his medical degree in 1892. He was a student under the guidance of Joseph Lister and was part of the earliest graduating classes to learn the new science of hygiene and sanitation as the germ theory of disease was adopted by mainstream medicine.

He remained in the UK, where he practiced medicine and raised a family in Hastings, and became a naturalized British subject. He was known for his philanthropy for the Royal East Sussex Hospital and for his work at a convalescent home in Capel-le-Ferne. His son James went on to serve with distinction in World War I and World War II.

== Early life ==
Makalua was born on 11 April 1866 in Lahaina, Maui, to father Manuia Makalua, a Deputy Sheriff of Lahaina and later Judge, and mother Kaipoleimanu Kahoohanohano Makalua. He grew up with one sister, Kapahukapuopakaalana. Makalua was a cousin of Kapiʻolani, the wife and future queen consort of Kalākaua.

Makalua completed his preparatory education at ʻIolani School in Honolulu. In 1880, Kalākaua's administration started a study abroad program for future leaders of Hawaii with the introduction of legislation by Robert Hoapili Baker. Kalākaua was initially influenced to create the program by previous work in the same area by Kamehameha III during his reign four decades earlier.

Makalua was chosen among the best of Hawaiian youth by the king as part of a group of 18 students, 17 men and one woman, to study art (engraving, music, and sculpture), engineering, foreign language, law, medicine, and military science, in six countries: China, England, Italy, Japan, Scotland, and the United States. Makalua was chosen, along with two other men, to study medicine in England.

== Study abroad ==
At the age of 16, Makalua left Hawaii under the guidance of Charles H. Judd. They traveled on the SS Australia to England in 1882, where Makalua attended St. Chad's College in Denstone, Staffordshire. He then entered King's College and later King's College School of Medicine. Back at home, Hawaii newspapers reported on his progress in school overseas. He obtained certificates in physiology, forensic medicine, and hygiene. As part of his studies, he performed surgical bandage dressing for Joseph Lister, a pioneer of antiseptic surgery. In 1890, while Makalua was still a student, Kalākaua sent him a letter, asking him to study the etiology of leprosy (Hansen's disease), as the Hawaiian people were suffering from the epidemic after it was first introduced to the islands in 1830. Two years later, Makalua received his medical degree (MB) in 1892.

== British subject by naturalization ==
Makalua and his son James, c. 1894

A year after graduating with a medical degree from Kings College, the Hawaiian Kingdom was overthrown in a coup d'état against Queen Liliʻuokalani on January 17, 1893. In a letter sent to the County Borough of Hastings much later, Makalua explained his feelings at the time of the overthrow:

The United States of America annexed the Islands. I have never claimed American citizenship, and indeed I had no wish to, considering I and most Hawaiians were forced to give up our independence. I believe that fact of annexation caused all Hawaiian subjects to become American subjects without further process. Therefore, I am at present technically an American- only technically. Since 1882 I have lived continuously in England. I married an English woman, all my friends of relation are British, I have a son holding a Commission in the British Army.

In 1915, Makalua applied for and became a British subject by naturalization.

== Personal life ==
Makalua married Annie Clementina Dewar on August 27, 1888, in London. His son, Matthew James Manuia Dewar, was born on August 8, 1890, and later held a commission in the British Army, fighting in both the first ( Major, Royal Sussex Regiment) and second world war (Royal Engineers). He was awarded the Croix de Guerre and the Officer of the Order of the British Empire (OBE).

== Later life ==
Makalua later moved to the seaside town of Hastings on the south coast of England. He held the qualifications of LRCP, a Licentiate of the Royal College of Physicians of London, and MRCS, a Member of the Royal College of Surgeons of England. He died on New Years Day, 1 January 1929, at his home at 40 Warrior Square, St Leonards-on-Sea. His obituary in the St. Leonards Observer read:

A popular and highly esteemed member of the medical profession, Mr. Matthew P. Makalua died on Tuesday at 30 Warrior Square. He was noted for his philanthropy and both he and his wife, who died recently, were intensely interested in all work among the poor.
Dr. Makalua was the originator of the scheme for the Druids tinfoil cot in the Royal East Sussex hospital, and he watched with enthusiasm its healthy growth. He was medical officer of the L.G.O.C. Convalescent home, Caple-ne-Ferne, where his popularity was great.

His funeral was held on 4 January 1929, at St. Mary Magdalen Church, with large numbers of people in attendance. He is buried in Hastings Cemetery next to his wife. The Hawaiian Youths Abroad group helps maintain his gravesite.

== Historical background ==
While Makalua was the first Native Hawaiian trained in Western medicine, earlier attempts had been tried to train doctors in Hawaii. With little support for the effort and discrimination rampant, the results were mixed. Earlier, in 1838, medical missionary Gerrit P. Judd, who became fluent in the Hawaiian, published the first medical textbook written entirely in the native language. Decades later, he opened the first medical school for Hawaiians in 1870 with only ten students. However, the school was closed after only two years.

The ten students were later given licenses to practice in Hawaii, and did so across the islands, but the licenses were not recognized outside of the native community, as they were issued by the Hawaiian Board of Health, while being opposed by the mainstream board of medicine, dominated by whites. This meant that the students were effectively licensed as kahuna, not as Western medical practitioners, although the difference was likely not that great, as both traditional Hawaiian medicine and Western medicine was largely ineffective (Note: Young: "During this era, however, Western medicine was all but helpless with infectious diseases, and Hawaiian medicine, with its emphasis on keeping the environment inviolate and sacred, might have been more useful.") at treating the most pressing diseases of the 1870s. (Note: Young: "...no Western treatments at this time were effective against measles, mumps, whooping cough, diphtheria, influenza, leprosy, or cholera".)

The germ theory of disease was still a minority view in the 1880s. It was not until the 1890s that it became widely accepted and taught in medical schools. Hawaii newspaper reports of Makalua's successful progress in medical school in 1889 noted that the science of hygiene and sanitation had only just been introduced at King's College, with Makalua being awarded a prize in the new subject. Germ theory eventually transformed hygiene and sanitation into new public health measures.

Looking back in history, later writers described Kalākaua's study abroad program as the Fulbright Program of its time, anticipating current practices in education. After its disestablishment in 1892, it was restored 126 years later as the Hawaiian Youths Abroad program by the Hawai‘inuiākea School of Hawaiian Knowledge at the University of Hawai‘i Mānoa in 2018.

== Research ==
The life of Makalua was largely forgotten until it was brought back into public awareness by librarian Agnes Quigg of Hamilton Library at the University of Hawaiʻi at Mānoa in the late 1980s. Several decades later, Benjamin Young, then Dean of Students at the University of Hawaiʻi John A. Burns School of Medicine, followed up on Quigg's research in the 2010s. Makalua had been a special interest of his for 25 years. Young traveled to the United Kingdom to uncover the rest of the story, discovering Makalua's gravesite and speaking directly with his surviving descendants, who provided access to rare primary source documents.

== See also ==
- Clan Dewar

== Sources ==
- Fuller, Jonathan (2025). "Theories of Contagion and Cancer". The New Modern Medicine: Disease, Evidence, and Epidemiological Medicine. Oxford University Press. ISBN 9780190066147. OCLC 1545511058.
- Duplicate Certificates of Naturalisation, Declarations of British Nationality, and Declarations of Alienage, Series: HO 334. Kew, Surrey, England: The National Archives.
- "Hawaiian Boys Abroad". Pacific Commercial Advertiser. February 27, 1886.
- Poole, Betty H. (5 February 1961). "'East-West' Students in Klakaua's Time". Honolulu Star-Bulletin.
- Quigg, Agnes (1988). "Kalakaua's Hawaiian Studies Abroad Program". The Hawaiian Journal of History. 22: 170–208. hdl:10524/103. OCLC 1140308970.
- "Sussex and the War". The Argus.
- "UH haumāna explore Kalākaua and Hawaiian Kingdom's legacy in Japan". University of Hawaiʻi News. University of Hawaiʻi. 2025-05-27.
- Young, Benjamin (2016). "Early Physicians of Hawai'i and Reflections on the Emergence of Hawaiian Doctors" (PDF). Hūlili: Multidisciplinary Research on Hawaiian Well-Being. 10. Kamehameha Schools: 35–44. ISSN 1547-4526. OCLC 53397751.
