= Norman W. Webber =

British army officer (1881–1950)

Brigadier-General Norman W. Webber CMG DSO
- Born: 22 February 1881; Horley, Surrey, England
- Died: 19 April 1950 (aged 69) Bexhill Hospital, Bexhill-on-Sea, Sussex, England

Brigadier-General Norman William Webber CMG DSO (22 February 1881 – 19 April 1950) was a staff officer in the British Army in World War I, who served as Chief of Staff (Brigadier-General, General Staff) to Lieutenant-General Sir Arthur Currie, Commander of the Canadian Corps, prior to and during the period known as Canada's Hundred Days. He received nine Mentions in Despatches during the war.

== Early life and career ==
Webber was born in Horley, Surrey, on 22 February 1881, the eldest son of Henry Webber and his wife Emily (née Morris). Henry Webber later became well known for being the oldest British soldier to be killed in World War I, although that claim is now disputed. N W Webber – ‘Tommy’ to family and friends – was educated at Bradfield College and the Royal Military Academy, Woolwich. He was gazetted a second lieutenant in the Royal Engineers on 25 June 1899.

From March 1901 he served with the 23rd Field Company, Royal Engineers in the Second Boer War under Major Spring Rice, inventor of the Rice Blockhouse. He was promoted to lieutenant on 31 December 1901. After peace was declared in May 1902, Webber left South Africa on board the SS Bavarian and arrived in the United Kingdom the following month. He was in Gibraltar with the 32nd Field Company RE from 1903 to 1905, and was prominent in the RE polo team. In 1906 he was posted to India with the 3rd Bombay Sappers & Miners. In 1911 he commanded a section of the 19th Sappers as part of an expedition under Rear-Admiral Sir Edmond Slade to the Makran coast in an attempt to discourage gun-running across the Persian Gulf. On his return to the UK Webber took a 2-year course at the Staff College, Camberley, passing out in 1914.

== First World War ==
Webber started the war as a captain with the 26th Field Company RE, attached to the British 1st Division. The Field Companies were heavily involved in demolitions in the retreat from Mons and in the building and repair of bridges and the construction of trenches at the Aisne. At 1st Ypres the 26th were thrown into the line as infantry by General Bulfin at the cost of many casualties. Webber received a ‘Mention in Despatches’.

On 2 November Webber was appointed GSO3 at 1st Division HQ. In June 1915, by now a brevet major, he was posted as GSO2 to the 47th London Division which was later embroiled in the Battle of Loos in the autumn of that year. He was promoted to major in November 1915.

In May 1916 Webber was promoted to temporary lieutenant-colonel and posted as GSO1 to the 2nd Canadian Division, which was then engaged in the Battle of Mount Sorrel. He received the DSO in the 1916 Birthday Honours. In addition to his GSO duties Webber spent some time in the summer of 1916 at British Army HQ helping to compile SS135. Instructions for the Training of Divisions for Offensive Action. This document, along with SS143. Instructions for the Training of Platoons for Offensive Action, became the principal training manuals for the British and Dominion armies and were also adopted by the US Army later in the war.

After the Battle of Flers-Courcelette, part of the Somme campaign, the Canadian Corps was moved to west of Vimy Ridge, which as part of the Battle of Arras, it attacked behind a creeping barrage on 9 April 1917. This was a major Canadian success and Webber, who had been much involved in the planning of it, was praised by Brigadier-General Alexander Ross as being "the most approachable, the most helpful and most co-operative" of the British staff officers attached to the Canadian Corps.

Webber received his sixth Mention for his efforts at Vimy Ridge. A further Mention came after the Canadian Corps’ struggle at Passchendaele. In December 1917 Webber was asked to write a report on the organisation of British Anti-Aircraft forces. He recommended that they be put in charge of an Assistant Director at GHQ. The report being accepted he was then given the job, an unusual posting for an Engineer officer. He was appointed Companion of the Order of St Michael and St George (CMG) in the 1918 New Years Honours.

In March 1918 Webber, who in January 1917 was promoted to brevet lieutenant colonel, was posted to the War Office with the rank of Temporary Brigadier-General as Deputy-Director of Mobilisation, to assist Major-General Basil Burnett-Hitchcock in planning for the demobilisation of British and Dominion forces after the war. He was there less than a week before the Germans launched the Spring Offensive of 1918, the brunt of it against the British 5th Army under General Sir Hubert Gough. Webber returned to France on the 24th and was immediately attached to Gough's staff at Dury, south of Amiens; however four days later Gough and his regular staff were dismissed by Field Marshal Sir Douglas Haig, to be replaced by General Sir Henry Rawlinson. Webber was not included in the dismissal, but on 8 April was posted as Brigadier-General, General Staff, to the Canadian Corps under Lieutenant-General Sir Arthur Currie.

=== Battle of Amiens ===
Webber was deeply involved in the planning for and the great deception that preceded the Battle of Amiens (8 August 1918). The Canadian Corps advanced up to 8 miles in their sector on the first day of the battle. In the afternoon the Canadian Corps advanced HQ at Gentelles was visited by General Rawlinson, and (Currie being absent) Webber asked Rawlinson if he could use the newly arrived British 32nd Division in lieu of the tired Canadian 3rd Division for the next day's proposed dawn advance. Rawlinson readily agreed and Webber issued orders on this basis. Later that evening he spoke by phone to Rawlinson's Chief of Staff, Major-General Sir Archibald Montgomery, who rescinded the permission to use the 32nd Division. New orders thus had to be issued late at night and in the ensuing confusion some Canadian units didn't get going until lunchtime the following day.

Webber was upset that he got the blame for 'aiding and abetting' the 4th Army Commander by suggesting the initial change of plan. After Amiens the Canadian Corps moved to a position east of Arras to face the German ‘Drocourt-Quéant’ defensive line. Webber claimed credit for instigating the successful night attack on the first objective, the village of Monchy-le-Preux, on 26 August. The Canadian Corps then advanced across the Canal du Nord, captured Cambrai, then Denain and were planning the attack on Valenciennes when two weeks before the Armistice Webber was recalled to the War Office as deputy director of demobilisation under the director, Burnett-Hitchcock. His position with the Canadian Corps was taken over by Brigadier-General R. J. F. Hayter. Webber was again Mentioned in Despatches on 8 November 1918, and received his ninth Mention on 5 July 1919.

Webber, who in June 1919 became a brevet colonel, remained with the War Office until the end of 1919. During this time over 3 million British and Dominion troops had returned to civilian life. He then returned to the Staff College with the substantive rank of colonel. He retired from the army with the rank of honorary brigadier-general on 21 November 1921.

== Post-war ==
In 1929 Webber joined the Army and Navy Stores department store group as assistant general manager. He became a director in 1944.

He maintained a lifelong interest in returned servicemen's organisations, becoming honorary treasurer of the British Empire Services League in 1924, and attended his last meeting of the League's annual conference in Ottawa in 1949.

== Personal life ==
On 26 April 1905 in Gibraltar Cathedral Webber married Maud F. A. H. Critchley-Salmonson. The wedding was attended by the governor of Gibraltar, Field Marshal Sir George White, who lent the couple his carriage and his launch to take them on their honeymoon. The marriage produced 3 children.

Webber died in Bexhill Hospital 19 April 1950.
