= East Sussex Healthcare NHS Trust =

NHS Hospital Trust

Coordinates: 50.885160°N 0.568124°E

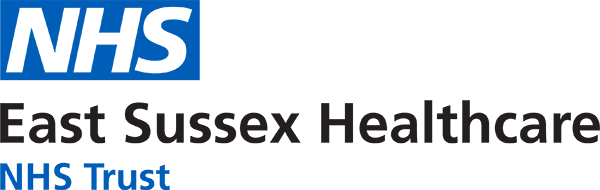
- Type: NHS trust
- Established: 1 April 2002
- Headquarters: St Leonards-on-Sea, East Sussex, England
- Hospitals: Bexhill Hospital; Conquest Hospital; Eastbourne District General Hospital
- Chair: Steve Phoenix
- Chief executive: Jayne Black
- Staff: 8,098 (2023/24)
- Website: www.esht.nhs.uk

East Sussex Healthcare NHS Trust is an NHS trust which runs Conquest Hospital in St Leonards-on-Sea, Eastbourne District General Hospital, and Bexhill Hospital, all in East Sussex, England.

== History ==
The trust was established as East Sussex Hospitals NHS Trust on 1 April 2002, taking its current name on 13 May 2011.

In 2021 the trust bought the private hospital Spire Sussex Hospital, which is physically linked to the trust's Conquest Hospital in Hastings. It has 22 beds and two operating theatres and 129 employees. It was leased to Spire Healthcare and operated as a private hospital since 1997. The trust will continue to provide private patient facilities at the site.

== Overview ==
East Sussex Healthcare NHS Trust provide acute hospital and community health services for people living in East Sussex and surrounding areas.

Their services are mainly provided from two district general hospitals, Conquest Hospital and Eastbourne DGH both of which have Emergency Departments and provide care 24 hours a day. They offer a range of surgical, medical and maternity services supported by diagnostic and therapy services.

At Bexhill Hospital they provide outpatients, ophthalmology, rehabilitation and intermediate care services. At Rye, Winchelsea and District Memorial Hospital they provide Outpatient and inpatient intermediate care services. They also provide some services at Uckfield Community Hospital. Their community teams also provide care in the patient's own home and from a number of clinics and GP surgeries in East Sussex.

There are around 525,000 people who live in East Sussex and the trust is one of the largest organisations in the county. They employ over 6,700 staff with an annual turnover of £380 million.

The trust has been given £5.05 million to work up detailed plans to develop Bexhill Hospital, Conquest Hospital and Eastbourne DGH over the next decade, as part of the second wave funding round earmarked for 2025–2030 in the government's Health Infrastructure Plan which includes 40 hospitals across England.

== Performance ==
In December 2013 the trust was one of thirteen hospital trusts named by Dr Foster Intelligence as having higher than expected higher mortality indicator scores for the period April 2012 to March 2013 in their Hospital Guide 2013.

The trust predicts a deficit of £19.4m in 2013–14.

In April 2014 High Weald Lewes Havens Clinical Commissioning Group served 12 months' notice on their £18m a year community services contract with the trust because of concerns about "the access to and consistency of NHS community services". A report to the commissioner's March board meeting mentioned "ad hoc and unnotified" closures of the trust's minor injury service, "inequitable access" to district nursing, and "intermittent closure" of a midwifery-led unit. The CCG says the financial problems of the trust could mean "there is a risk that the provider may seek to take short term decisions that reduce the equitable provision of community services to save cost. Equally, there is a risk that services could be deemed, 'unsafe' because of staffing issues." The CCGs in Eastbourne and Hastings are continuing their contracts with the Trust, but High Weald are putting their community services contract out to tender.

The Care Quality Commission raised concerns over outpatient records and surgical practices at Eastbourne District General Hospital after an inspection in September 2014. It also found that safety and leadership was inadequate. The leaders of the trust were subsequently urged to resign by the East Sussex County Council health overview and scrutiny committee and by Hastings Borough Council.

After a further CQC inspection which found a "void" between the "board perception" and "reality of working at the trust" the trust was put into special measures and Stuart Welling, the chair, resigned. The trust paid a firm called Prederi £45,000 to help with its recovery plan.

In February 2016 it was expecting a deficit of £48.7 million for the year.

In March 2016 the trust was ranked bottom in the Learning from Mistakes League. It was put into special measures in October 2016.

In February 2018 it was predicting a deficit of over £56 million – just less than 15% of its total income.

In November 2018 the trust to receive £1.7 million funding to implement electronic prescribing. It is anticipated this new electronic prescribing and medicines administration (ePMA) system will be rolled out across the trust during 2020/2021.

In February 2020 The Care Quality Commission (CQC) has rated the trust as 'Good' overall and 'Outstanding' for providing both 'Caring' and 'Effective' services following their inspection in November and December 2019.

In June 2020 the trust ended the 2019/20 financial year with a small surplus of £50k by exceeding the year-end target that it set itself.

A 1.1MWp solar system and a dual stage heat pump system is to be installed at Eastbourne District General Hospital as part of a £27 million energy management contract with Veolia targeting carbon savings of 4,129 tonnes per year.

== See also ==
- Healthcare in Sussex
- List of hospitals in England
- List of NHS trusts
