= Eastbourne District General Hospital =

- East Sussex Healthcare NHS Trust
- Eastbourne District General Hospital

Geography
- Location: Eastbourne, East Sussex, England
- Coordinates: 50.7864829°N 0.2697638°E

Organisation
- Care system: National Health Service
- Type: General

Services
- Emergency department: Yes
- Beds: 380

History
- Founded: 1977

Links
- Website: www.esht.nhs.uk/eastbourne-dgh/

Eastbourne District General Hospital is a National Health Service hospital in Eastbourne in East Sussex, England. It is managed by the East Sussex Healthcare NHS Trust.

== History ==
The hospital, which was built in the mid-1970s by local building contractor Walter Llewellyn & Sons Ltd, was officially opened by Princess Alexandra in 1977. It was expanded in 1989 under a scheme which allowed the old Victorian St Mary's Hospital to close and be demolished in 1990. In 2015 the hospital confirmed that it had sent off a sample, taken from a patient with a history of travel in West Africa, for precautionary ebola testing at Public Health England.

A new day surgery unit called the Sussex Surgical Centre opened at the hospital in September 2025, containing four operating theatres.

== See also ==
- Healthcare in Sussex
- List of hospitals in England
