= St Leonards-on-Sea =

Town in East Sussex, England

Coordinates: 50°51′20″N 00°33′09″E

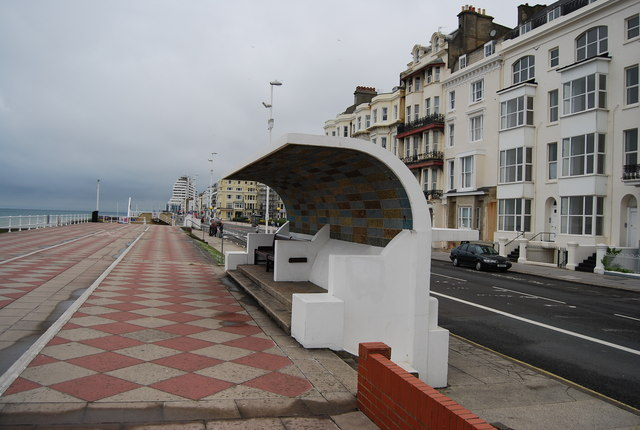
- The seafront at St Leonards-on-Sea

- Location within East Sussex
- OS grid reference: TQ7909
- District: Hastings
- Shire county: East Sussex
- Region: South East
- Country: England
- Sovereign state: United Kingdom
- Post town: ST. LEONARDS-ON-SEA
- Postcode district: TN37, TN38
- Dialling code: 01424
- Police: Sussex
- Fire: East Sussex
- Ambulance: South East Coast
- UK Parliament: Hastings and Rye

St Leonards-on-Sea (commonly known as St Leonards) is a town and seaside resort in the borough of Hastings in East Sussex, England. It has been part of the borough since the late 19th century and lies to the west of central Hastings. The original part of the settlement was laid out in the early 19th century as a new town: a place of elegant houses designed for the well-off; it also included a central public garden, a hotel, an archery, assembly rooms and a church. Today's St Leonards has extended well beyond that original design, although the original town still exists within it.

It is now nicknamed Dalston-on-Sea after becoming home to many trendy hipsters from areas in London such as Dalston. It appears under this name in the novel The End of Everything.

== History ==
The land that is now St Leonards was once owned by the Levett family, an ancient Sussex gentry family of Norman origin who owned the adjacent manor of Hollington, and subsequently by their descendants, the Eversfields, who rose to prominence from their iron foundries and widespread property holdings during Tudor times. Eversfields served as sheriffs of Surrey and Sussex in the 16th and 17th centuries and were later baronets before the family became extinct.

James Burton, a successful London property developer who had developed large areas of Bloomsbury and the houses around Regent's Park, purchased land from the Eversfield estate to put into being his concept of a seaside resort. The land was part of Gensing Farm, and included a small wooded valley leading down to the sea. Work on the plan started in early 1826. It included a house for himself (West Villa: now 57 Marina); service areas were provided, such as shops and laundering (Mercatoria and Lavatoria), as well as public buildings for entertainment and the picturesque siting of villas amongst the wooded slopes and water of the central gardens, to be paid for by subscription.

In addition he persuaded the Turnpike Commissioners to have the road leading to St Leonards included in the scheme, and arranged for the road through Silverhill to be built so as to give access. Before he died in 1837, St Leonards (Royal Victoria) Hotel, the South Colonnade, an archway marking the town boundary with Hastings, and tall seafront houses (as far as 71 Marina) had also been completed. His grave is marked by a pyramid in the churchyard above St Leonard's Church. In 1850 his son Decimus (1800–1881) started the second phase of building, by acquiring more land and extending the development westward. He lived in the town for the remainder of his life.

Decimus Burton became a Commissioner of the new town in 1833. He leased a triangle of land bounded by Mercatoria, St John's Church, Maze Hill and Kenilworth Road. Here he built The Cottage (now St Leonards Lodge), Maze Hill House (demolished), The Mount (13 houses), The Uplands (6), The Lawn (10), and six semi-detached houses which later became a school (later part of the college but now closed for redevelopment). Later, in Upper Maze Hill he built Baston Lodge, Tower House and Clone House (now Healey House). He gave some land in Mercatoria for a National School, and completed his father's seafront terrace by building 72 to 82 Marina. Modern (2006) photographs give a flavour of this development.

St Leonards became a fashionable seaside destination. Princess Sophia of Gloucester stayed at Gloucester Lodge on Quarry Hill in 1831. The building was formerly named the Castellated Villa but changed to Gloucester Lodge in honour of her. Princess Victoria and her mother the Duchess of Kent, stayed in the town for the winter of 1834–1835, occupying a residence since renamed Crown House. In 1837 Queen Adelaide passed the winter there.

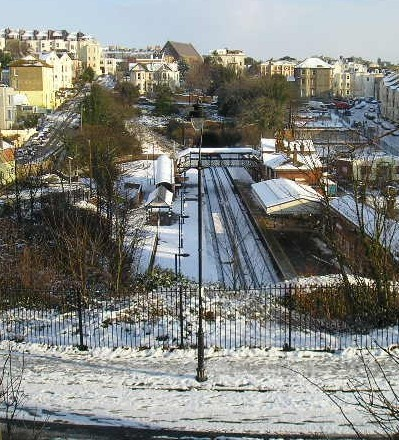
Warrior Square Station

The popularity of St Leonards, however, was not lost upon the town of Hastings. It had already begun to expand westwards, through Pelham Place and Wellington Square, and further building began. The Eversfield Estate, from whom the Burtons had bought land, saw the potential and it too began to sell off more space, having obtained an Act of Parliament opening the way for speculative builders beyond the Burton boundaries. As a result, the area between the two towns began to fill with properties. In 1875, the two towns merged into the County Borough of Hastings, and by then the total seafront had reached some three miles (4.8 km). Soon after that, the Warrior Square and Upper St Leonards areas were being developed.

By now the railways had arrived: the London, Brighton and South Coast Railway reached West Marina in 1845, although it was not until 1852 that the station later named St Leonards Warrior Square was opened by the South Eastern Railway.

Construction of the pier began in March 1888, and it was opened by Lord and Lady Brassey on 28 October 1891. Positioned almost opposite the Royal Victoria Hotel, the shore end had a pavilion constructed of intricate ironwork at the entrance so that visitors could drive straight to the door and avoid the seafront weather. There was also a tollhouse to the left of the entrance that was demolished by a storm on 12 February 1899. The far end of the pier had a building used for dancing, and later as a roller hockey rink. During the 1920s the pier was modernised and finally cut in half during the Second World War as protection against invasion. The remains were removed in 1951.

In 1901 the civil parish called Hastings St Leonards had a population of 7693. On 1 April 1909 the parish was abolished and merged with Hastings.

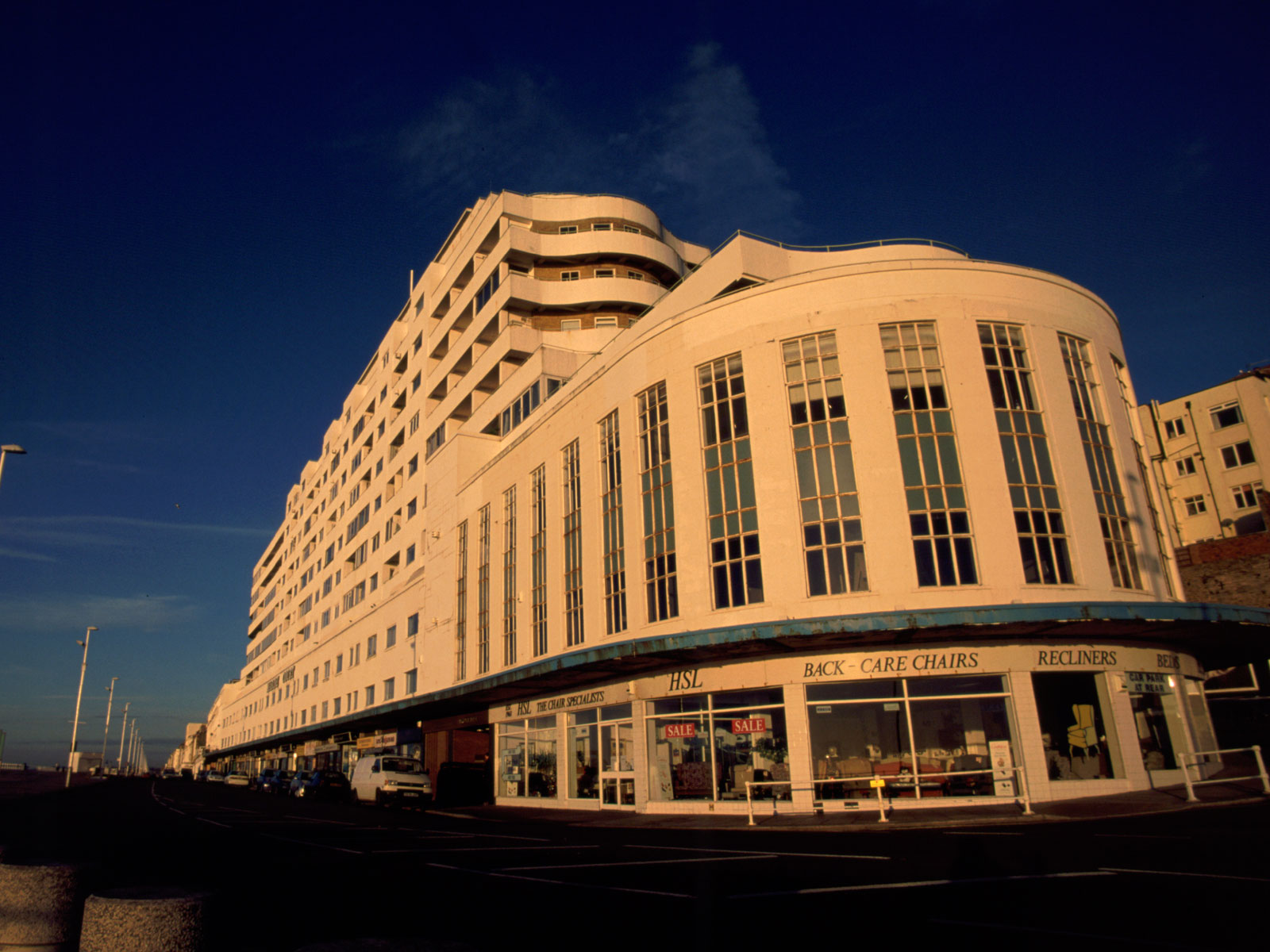
Marine Court on the sea front

On the seafront stands an ocean liner shaped art-deco building known as Marine Court, which upon completion in 1937 was the tallest block of flats in the United Kingdom, comprising some 153 flats and 3 restaurants. Despite this claim to fame, entries to a competition to name the building show that it was not universally popular. Now a listed building, it has recently been bought by the residents after many years of neglect and is in the process of being fully restored.

St Leonards Golf Club, Hastings, (now defunct) was founded in 1902/3. The club closed in 1960.

== Geography ==
The town of St Leonards today occupies, firstly, the fairly steeply climbing land immediately adjacent to the west of Hastings, leading up towards Silverhill and Hollington; and secondly, an area to the west where the land is lower lying. The latter part of the town – Bulverhythe – is thought to be the original site of the port of Hastings, since cut off by longshore drift of pebbles. Within the higher land there are some small valleys: that through which the Priory stream flows through Alexandra Park being the main one.

In November 2023, the steep land between Marina on the sea front and the West Hill Road was affected by a series of landslips, leading to local homes being evacuated.

== Healthcare ==
In 1840 the Royal East Sussex Hospital was opened to provide care for the sick poor, this was renamed in 1887 as the Hastings, St Leonards and East Sussex Hospital. In 1923 it was rebuilt in Cambridge Road and renamed the Royal East Sussex Hospital. In 1993 this closed when the Conquest Hospital, was opened. This is managed by the East Sussex Healthcare NHS Trust. In 2021 a new medical centre which houses two GP surgeries and a pharmacy, located next to West St Leonards Community Centre, was opened. It is intended to act as a modern health hub for up to 20,000 patients.

== Transport ==
The principal roads in St Leonards are the seafront (Grand Parade and Marina) part of the A259 coastal route; and London Road. Two of the three railway stations remain open: St Leonards (West Marina) was closed in 1967. Today's bus and train services provide the public transport for the town.

== Media ==
Local news and television programmes are provided by BBC South East and ITV Meridian. Television signals are received from either the Heathfield or Hastings TV transmitters.

The town’s local radio stations are BBC Radio Sussex on 104.5 FM, Heart South on 102.0 FM and More Radio Hastings on 107.8 FM.

Local newspapers are the Hastings & St Leonards Observer and Hastings Independent Press.

== Parks and gardens ==
Warrior Square Gardens – The site was opened as a subscription garden in 1852. The Council purchased a strip of land at the southernmost tip to erect a statue of Queen Victoria which was unveiled on 31 December 1902. All but the uppermost rose garden was acquired by the Council in 1920 with the upper garden being donated to the Council in 1930. Recent improvements include major re-landscaping and wall restoration, completed in 2001. The lower section was completely re-laid following extensive excavation by Southern Water.

St Leonards Gardens – Originally laid out as a private garden for the Burton family, St Leonards Gardens was bought by the town for £9,000 in 1879. The gardens had two ponds and a maze, which proved very popular and gave Maze Hill its name. Gothic-style buildings were built around the wooded valley. The gateway to St Leonards Gardens is an imposing Burton building. The garden was purchased by the Council in 1880 and opened to the public; it consists of trees, shrubs and grass areas with a central pond. The Council applied for a Heritage Lottery Grant for the restoration of this garden and work is now complete.

Gensing Gardens – The garden was purchased by the Council in 1872 and landscaped by the then Borough Surveyor, William Andrews. Little is recorded of the history of the site, although the name comes from the original farm. The garden has been subject to numerous improvements during the last 10 years and consists of shrub and flower beds, trees, grass areas, and an equipped playground suitable for children up to 14 years old. It is located within a priority ward and is a rare and valuable open space within its neighbourhood.

Markwick Gardens – The Gardens were formed in the 1860s primarily for the use and pleasure of the residents of Markwick Terrace, which was built in the 1830-40s. At that time, the land was owned by the Eversfield Trust, which no longer exists and the gardens are now owned, privately, by the Eversfield Estates. (Markwick was the surname of one branch of Eversfield family descendants.) Since the war the gardens have been run by a Committee of local residents as the Estate now takes no part in the running. Access to the gardens is by membership of the Markwick Gardens Association.

== Notable residents ==
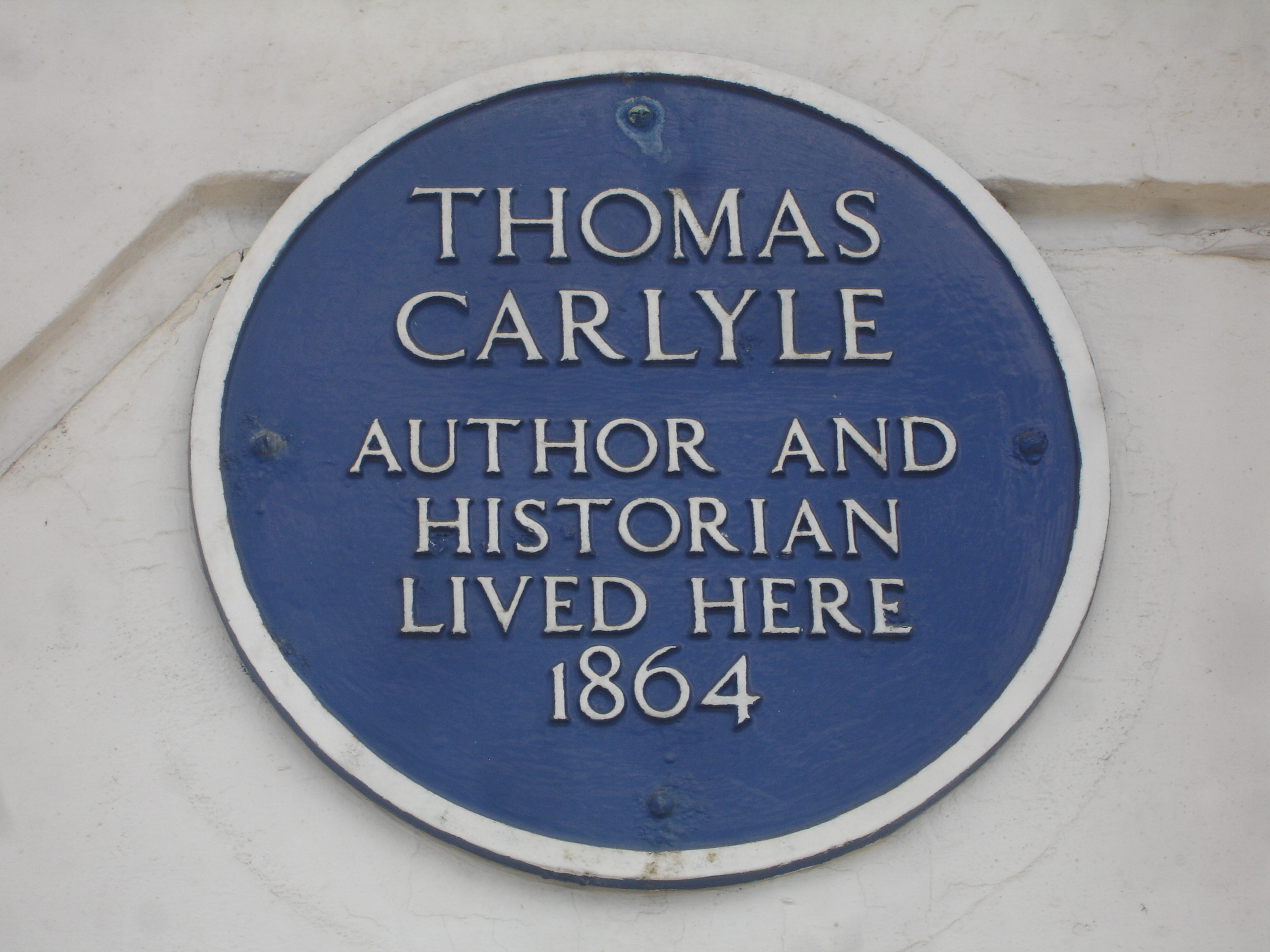
Plaque at 117 Marina commemorating Thomas Carlyle's residency in the summer of 1864, which he wrote of in his Reminiscences (1881)

Queen Adelaide (1792–1849), consort of William IV, lived in St Leonards as a widow. Thomas Carlyle (1795–1881) lived at 117 Marina in the summer of 1864, in order to be near his ailing wife Jane Carlyle, who was in possession of caretakers. Elizabeth Eiloart (1827–1898), novelist, retired to St Leonards, and King Solomon's Mines author Henry Rider Haggard came to live at North Lodge, Maze Hill, the house built across the road at the entrance to old St Leonards; this remained his home until 1923. Robert Tressell, author of The Ragged Trousered Philanthropists, lived at 241 London Road from 1907. Summerfields School produced the alumnus Rainier III, Prince of Monaco.

Musicologist Herbert Antcliffe lived at 111 London Road with his wife Helena after the war.

George Bristow was the taxidermist at the centre of the Hastings Rarities ornithological fraud; his business address was 15 Silchester Road. Fred Judge FRPS founded the local picture postcard manufacturer Judges Postcards. Sheila Kaye-Smith was a prolific author whose novels are set in the Sussex countryside around Hastings and Rye; she was born in St Leonards, the daughter of a local physician and lived in Dane Road until her marriage in 1924. George Monger was awarded a VC during the Siege of Lucknow in 1857, and after leaving the army, he lived in Tower Road, St Leonards where he died in 1887. Historian Prof Roy Porter (1946–2002) retired to St Leonards. Dr Thomas Duncan Greenlees FRSE retired here in 1922 and died here in 1929.

Archibald Belaney (1888-1938) "Grey Owl" achieved fame as a conservationist during his life, after his death the revelation of his non-Native origins and other autobiographical fabrications negatively affected his reputation. Born in England and migrating to Canada in the first decade of the 20th century, Belaney rose to prominence as a notable author, lecturer, and one of the "most effective apostles of the wilderness" The Venerable Luke Irvine-Capel, Archdeacon of Chichester was the Priest-in-Charge of Christ Church with St Mary Magdalene and St. Peter and St. Paul from 2013 to 2014, and thereafter served as Rector (merely a legal transition) from 2014 to 2019, before his appointment as Archdeacon.

A. E. Holt White (1851-1933), author and illustrator of The butterflies and moths of Teneriffe, resided at 3 Warrior Square Terrace, St Leonards-on-Sea.

Poly Styrene of X-Ray Spex lived in North Street, St Leonards-on-Sea. Indie pop musician and literary diarist Dickon Edwards moved to St Leonards in 2024.

The 2018 PDC World Darts Championship Winner and 2019 PDC World Matchplay Champion Rob Cross hails from St Leonards-on-Sea.

Baston Lodge, Upper Maze Hill, was the childhood home of Alan Turing.

== Views around St Leonards ==
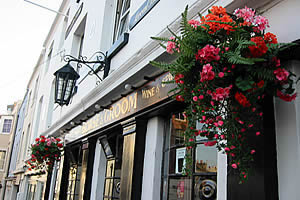
Horse and Groom – St Leonards' oldest public house (1829)

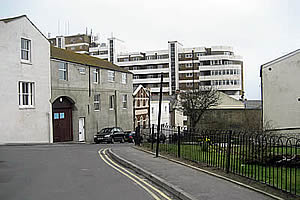
Mews Road with Marine Court in background

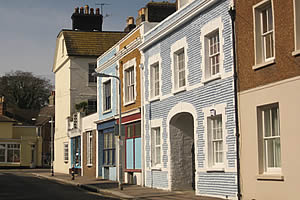
North Street with Kenilworth Road in background

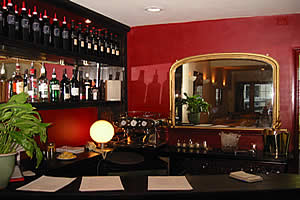
St Clements – Michelin Bib Gourmand awarded restaurant

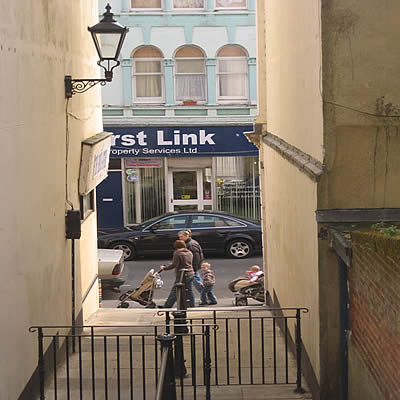
Steps down to Kings Road

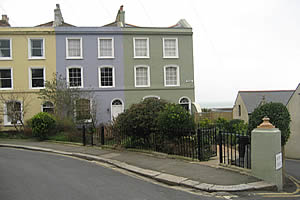
Stanhope Place
