= Thomas Wright Everett =

American resident in Hawaii (1823–1895)

Thomas Wright Everett (November 4, 1823 – September 4, 1895) was an early American resident of the Kingdom of Hawaii who served as the last Governor of Maui from 1892 to 1893.

== Life ==
Everett was born in Boston, Massachusetts on November 4, 1823, to Thomas Everett (1791–1837), a Boston merchant from Dorchester, and Nancy Williams Wright (1789–1858). He was a descendant of American pioneer Richard Everett, founder of the city of Springfield and the town of Dedham. After finishing school, he learned the printer's trade at West Brookfield and in 1848, he returned to Boston to work. In 1849, he traveled to San Francisco aboard the bark Orb to take part in the California Gold Rush. However, on November 15, 1849, he left California and traveled to Honolulu in the Kingdom of Hawaii aboard the bark Memnom. In Hawaii, he started life as a trader and sold produce and supplies to visiting American whaling ships.

He later settled on the island of Maui, and married Ellen Richardson (1824–1890), the part Native Hawaiian daughter of George Richardson, on February 8, 1860, at Lahaina. They did not have any children, but he adopted many orphaned relatives of his wife. Residing in the Kingdom of Hawaii for the remainder of his life, Everett held the position deputy sheriff and sheriff of the island of Maui for more than forty years. He also co-owned the Ulupalakua Ranch, which produced potatoes, flour, wheat corn and other produce, and a homestead in Waikapu. On May 17, 1892. Queen Liliuokalani appointed Everett to the restored office of Governor of Maui. The office of governors had been abolished by the legislature of the Kingdom after the Bayonet Constitution of 1887. Prior to this, the position was last held by Robert Hoapili Baker, a high chief and royal favorite of King Kalākaua. Everett presided as the Governor of Maui and the adjacent islands of Molokai, Lanai and Kahoʻolawe. He did not hold the post for long. After the overthrow of the Kingdom of Hawaii in January 1893, the Provisional Government of Hawaii passed an act abolishing the island governorships again; this act passed on February 27 and went into effect on February 28.

Ex-Governor Everett died at his homestead at Waikapu, Maui, on September 4, 1895. After a funeral attended by close friends, he was buried next to his wife Ellen. His obituary in the Honolulu-based newspaper The Independent described Everett as:

Tom Everett was a true New Englander. He was gruff and at times even rough, but nothing can be better express the charter of the man than the few words said by a former Hawaiian employee of the deceased last night to the editor of this paper. "Tom dead? True! An honest man is dead."

Government offices
| Vacant Title last held by Robert Hoapili Baker | Governor of Maui; 1892–1893 | Position abolished |
