= A. E. Holt White =

English writer and illustrator

A. E. Holt White FRHS
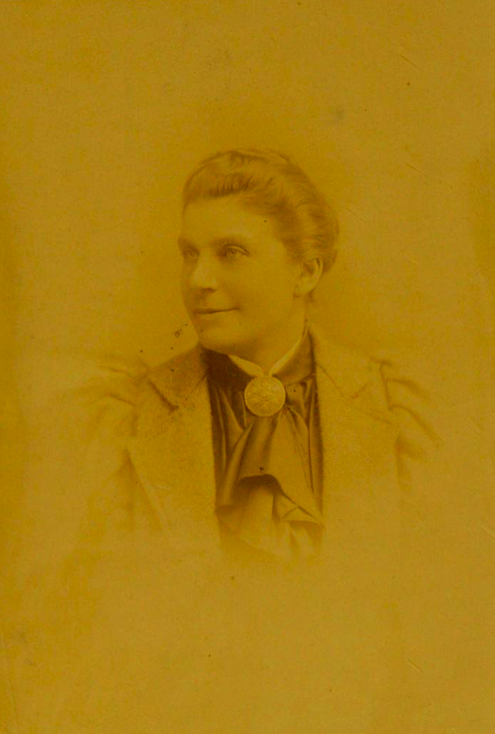
- (1893)
- Born: Agnes Edith Fooks; 1851 Dartford, Kent, England
- Died: 2 February 1933 (aged 81–82) St Leonards-on-Sea, England
- Occupation: writer; illustrator
- Genre: Non-fiction
- Notable works: The butterflies and moths of Teneriffe
- Spouse: Rashleigh Holt-White
- Relatives: Gilbert White

A. E. Holt White FRHS (née Fooks; 1851–1933) was an English non-fiction writer and illustrator, and Fellow of the Royal Horticultural Society. She was the author and illustrator of The butterflies and moths of Teneriffe (1894), a work edited by her husband, Rashleigh Holt-White, vice-president of the Selborne Society. In addition to her literary and artistic work, she loaned and donated historical artifacts and artworks to British institutions, including the Victoria and Albert Museum and the Sussex Archaeological Society. Born in Kent, Holt-White lived in St Leonards-on-Sea, England, where she remained until her death in 1933.

== Biography ==
Agnes Edith Fooks was born in Dartford, Kent, England in 1851. She married Rashleigh Holt-White in Dartford on 23 December 1879, vice-president of the Selborne Society.

Mrs. Holt-White was the author and illustrator of The butterflies and moths of Teneriffe (1894). Her husband, Rashleigh, edited the book. She was a connection by marriage of Gilbert White, of Selborne. In 1892–93, Mrs. Holt-White spent the winter in Teneriffe for her health. The book she authored and provided the illustrations for are the result of her observations.

In 1917, she made a loan to the Victoria and Albert Museum of six English 18th century "firing-glasses" from Bristol, engraved with masonic and other emblems. In 1926, she donated two sketches of the old Chain Pier, Brighton, to the Sussex Archaeological Society's library.

In July 1931, Sotheby's held an auction of Holt-White's books.

Agnes Holt-White resided at 3 Warrior Square Terrace, St Leonards-on-Sea, England. She died in that town on 2 February 1933.

== Awards and honours ==
Holt-White was elected a Fellow of the Royal Horticultural Society at its General Meeting of 11 January 1916.
