= Conquest Hospital =

Coordinates: 50.88536°N 0.56769°E

- East Sussex Healthcare NHS Trust
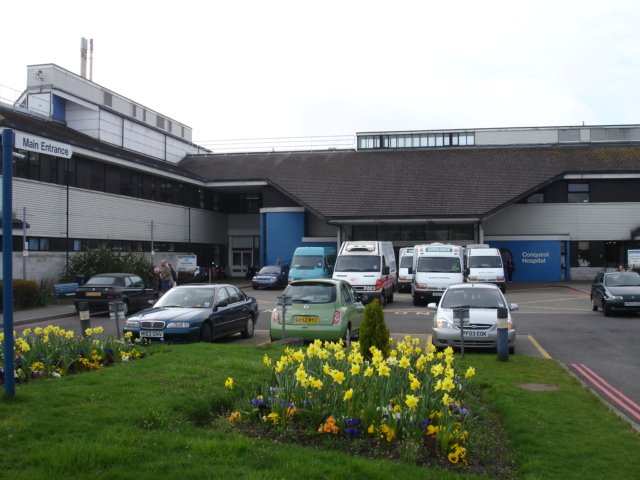
- Conquest Hospital

- Shown in East Sussex

Geography
- Location: The Ridge, St Leonards-on-Sea, Hastings, East Sussex, England, United Kingdom

Organisation
- Care system: National Health Service
- Type: District general
- Affiliated university: None
- Patron: None

Services
- Emergency department: Yes Accident & Emergency
- Beds: 418

History
- Founded: 1988

Links
- Website: www.esht.nhs.uk/conquest/
- Lists: Hospitals in England

Conquest Hospital is a National Health Service hospital in St Leonards-on-Sea in Hastings in East Sussex, England. It is managed by the East Sussex Healthcare NHS Trust.

== History ==
The laying of the foundation stone for the hospital was commemorated when Kenneth Clarke, Minister of Health unveiled a plaque on the site in 1988. The new facility, which was built by Cementation, was intended to consolidate services previously provided by the Eversfield Hospital in St Leonards, and three hospitals in Hastings, the Buchanan Hospital, St Helens Hospital and the Royal East Sussex Hospital. The new hospital was fully available to patients by 1992 and was officially opened by the Princess Royal in February 1993. The Princess Royal also opened the second phase of the hospital in July 1997.

In the early 2000s historic Doulton picture tiles of nursery rhymes, painted by Margaret E. Thompson, from the old Buchanan Hospital were installed in the Conquest Hospital.

The radiology facilities were comprehensively upgraded in 2015.

== Gallery ==
Stained glass windows and picture tiles

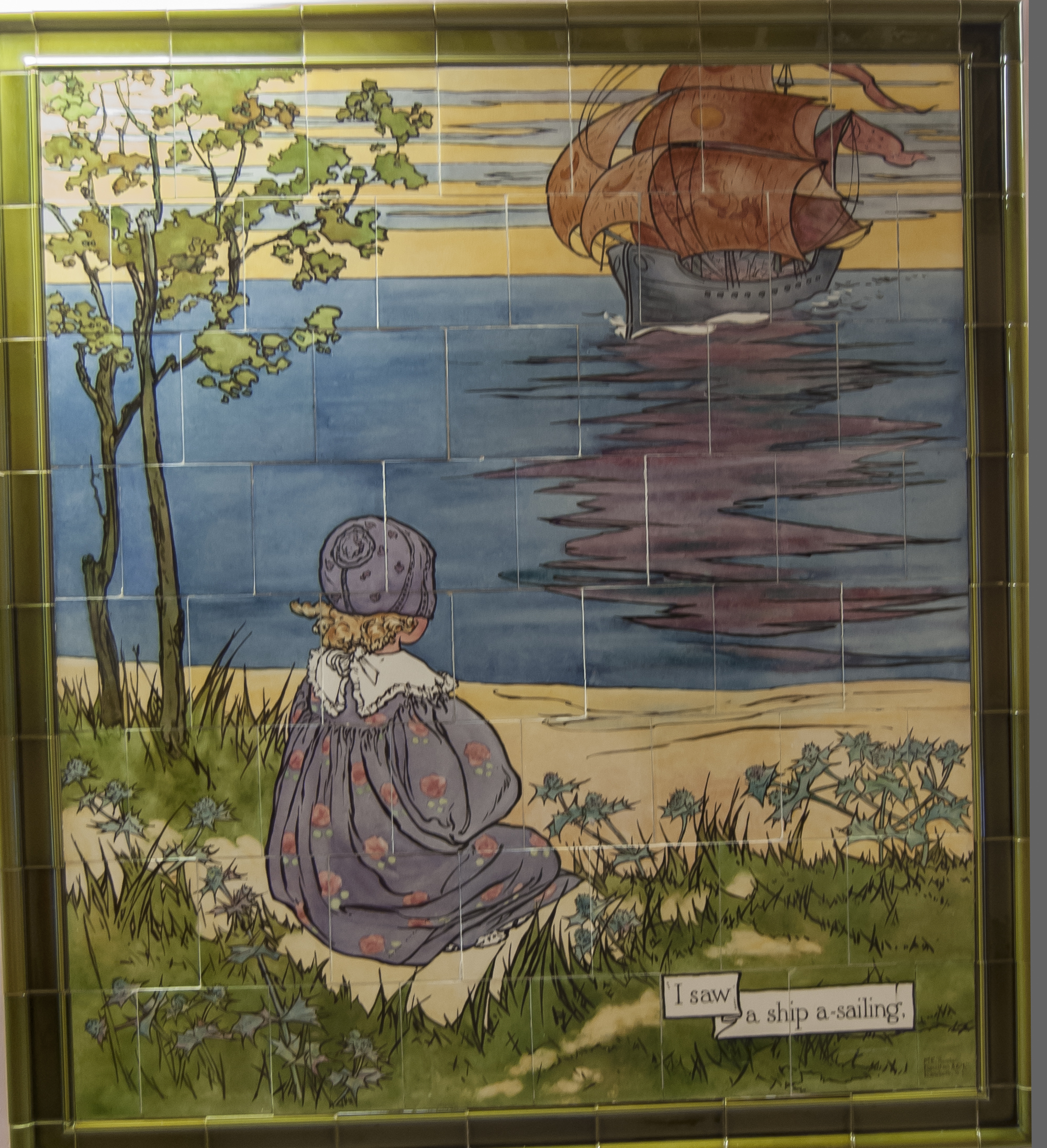

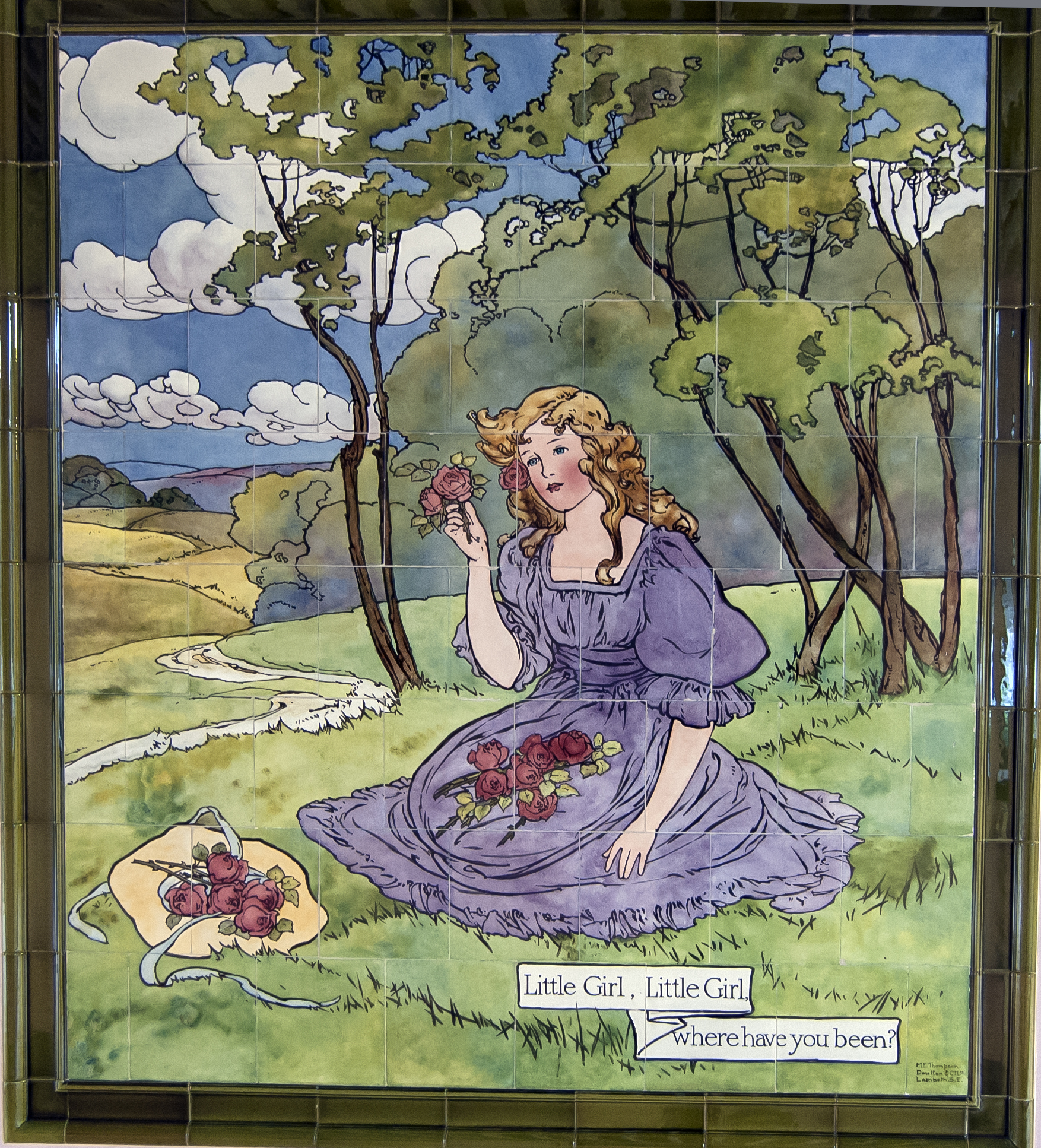

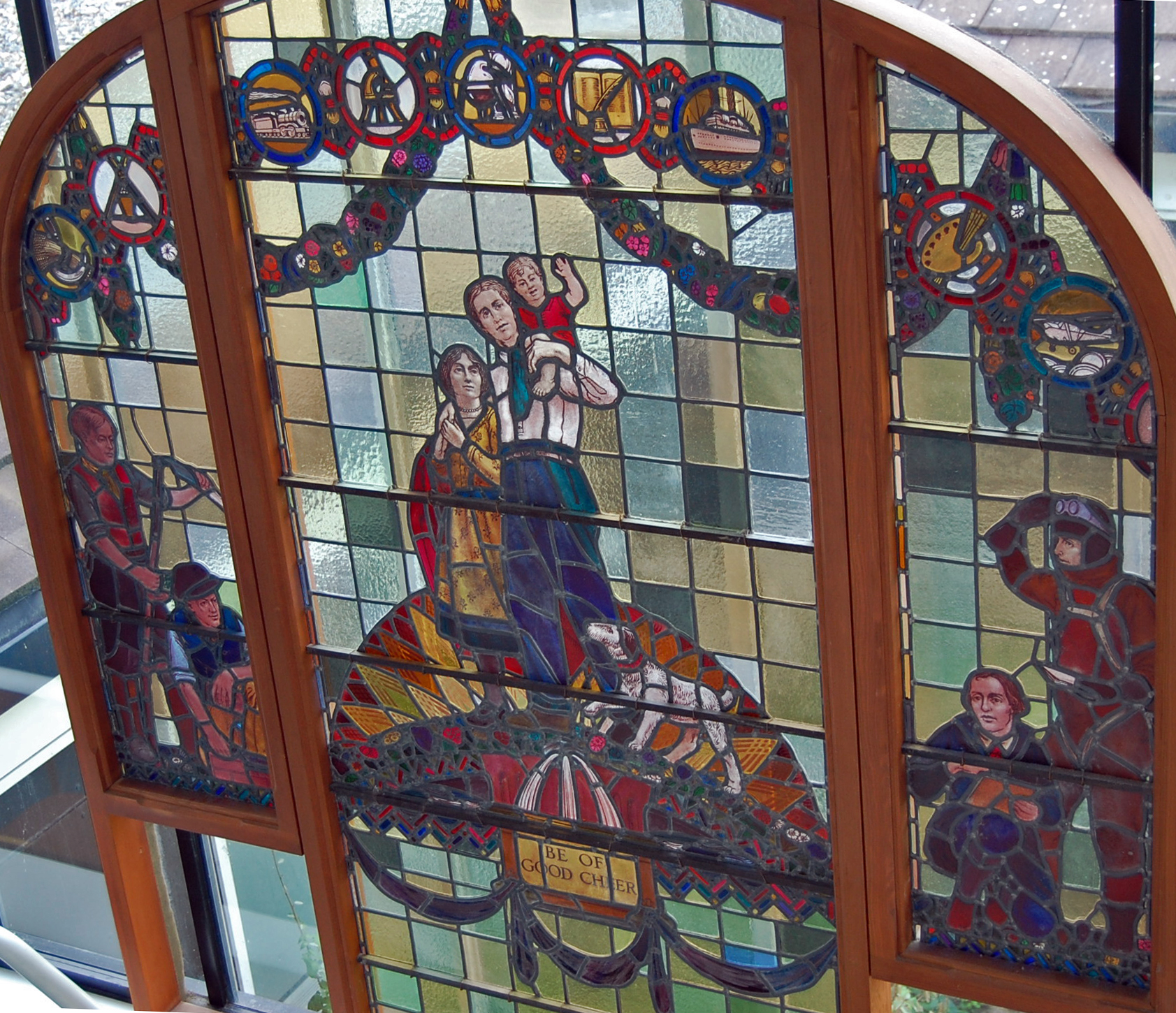

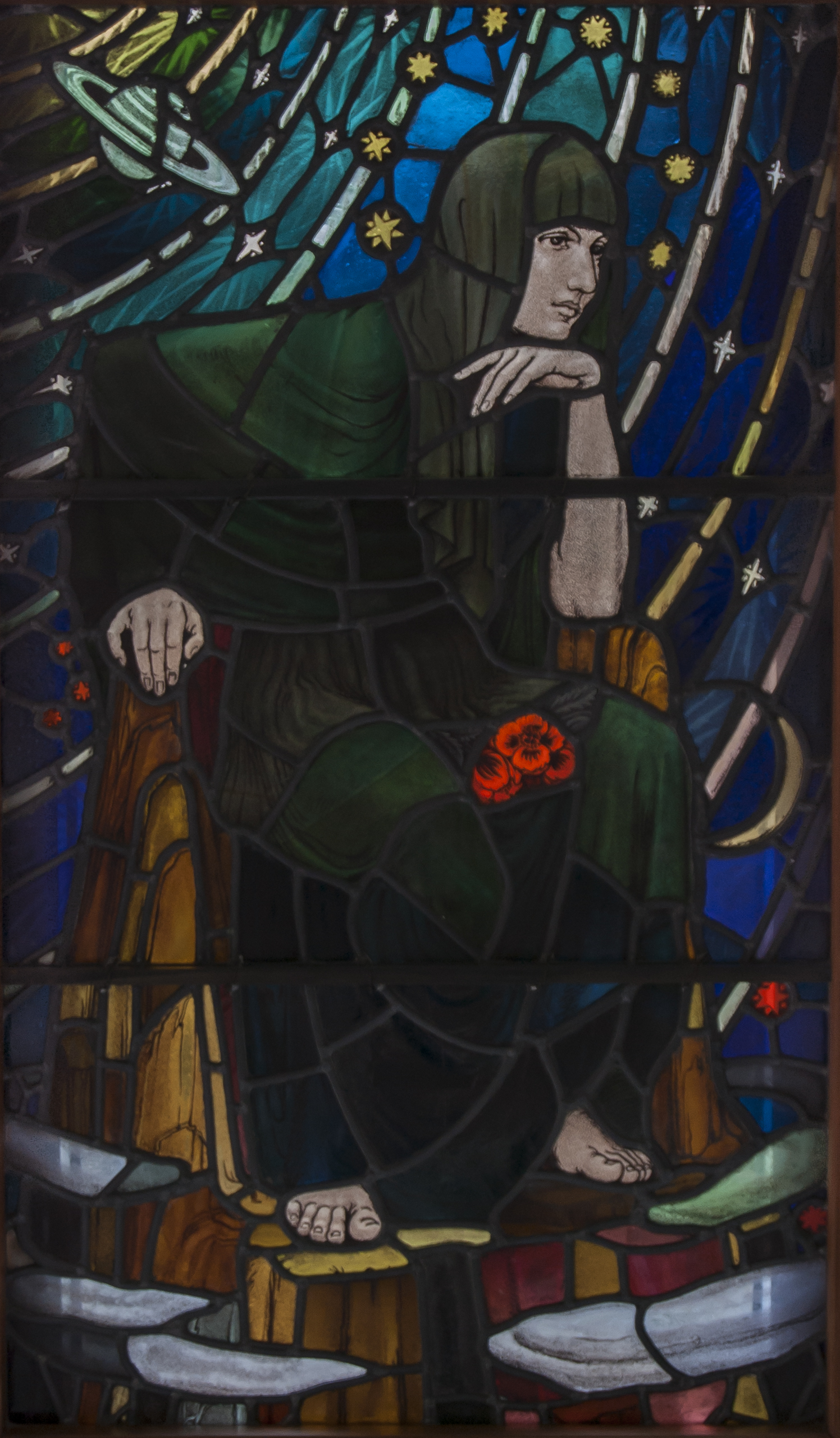

== See also ==
- Healthcare in Sussex
- List of hospitals in England
