= Margaret Thompson (artist) =

British artist and designer

Margaret E. Thompson (born 1873) was a book illustrator, designer and artist who worked for Royal Doulton where she painted vases and ceramic picture tiles used to decorate the walls of children's hospitals.

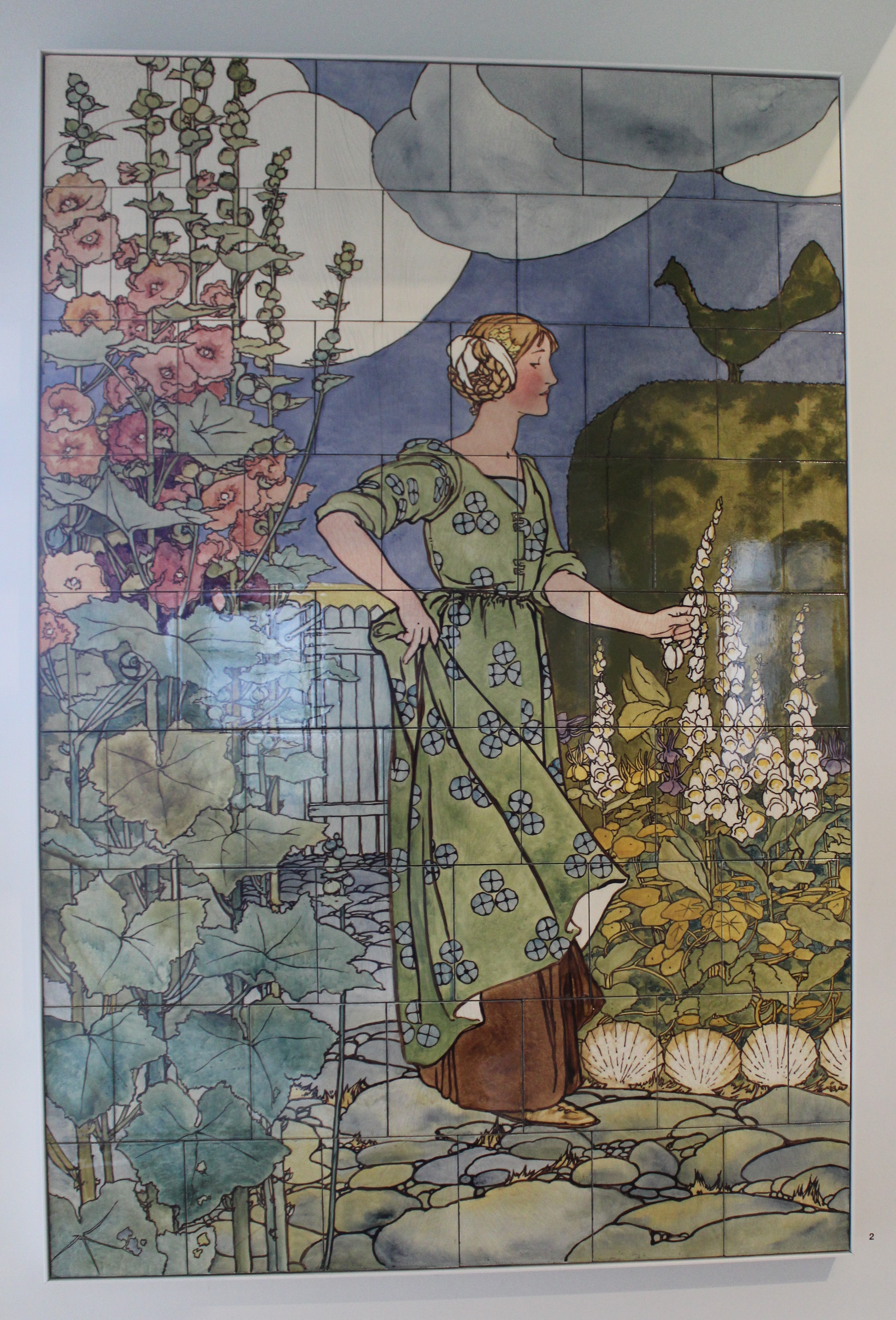
Mary, Mary, Quite Contrary panel in V&A Museum

Thompson was born in 1873 in Kolkata (formerly Calcutta). She attended Goldsmiths in London (also known as the New Cross School of Art) where she won a Silver Medal for Applied Design in 1897 followed by a Gold Medal at the Royal College in 1898 and first prize in a competition in The Studio in 1898 for an illustration for "The Song of Solomon".

From 1899 to 1926 she worked as an artist and designer for Doultons in Lambeth, working in both Art Nouveau and early Art Deco. She painted faience vases with stylised depictions of fairies, mermaids and women as well as stylised natural subjects initially in faience but later, from about 1910, in stoneware. She won prizes for her work at Doultons: at St. Louis in 1904 (bronze), Ghent in 1913 (gold) and Paris in 1925 (silver).

In the late 19th and early 20th century decorative hand painted ceramic tiles, depicting nursery rhymes and fairy tales, were used to decorate children's hospital wards to amuse and distract sick children. Thompson, and her colleague William Rowe, designed and painted picture tiles. Her tiles decorated the following hospitals: St Thomas' Hospital in London; the Royal Victoria Infirmary in Newcastle; Wellington Hospital in New Zealand; Buchanan Hospital in Hastings; Sassoon Hospital in Pune, India.

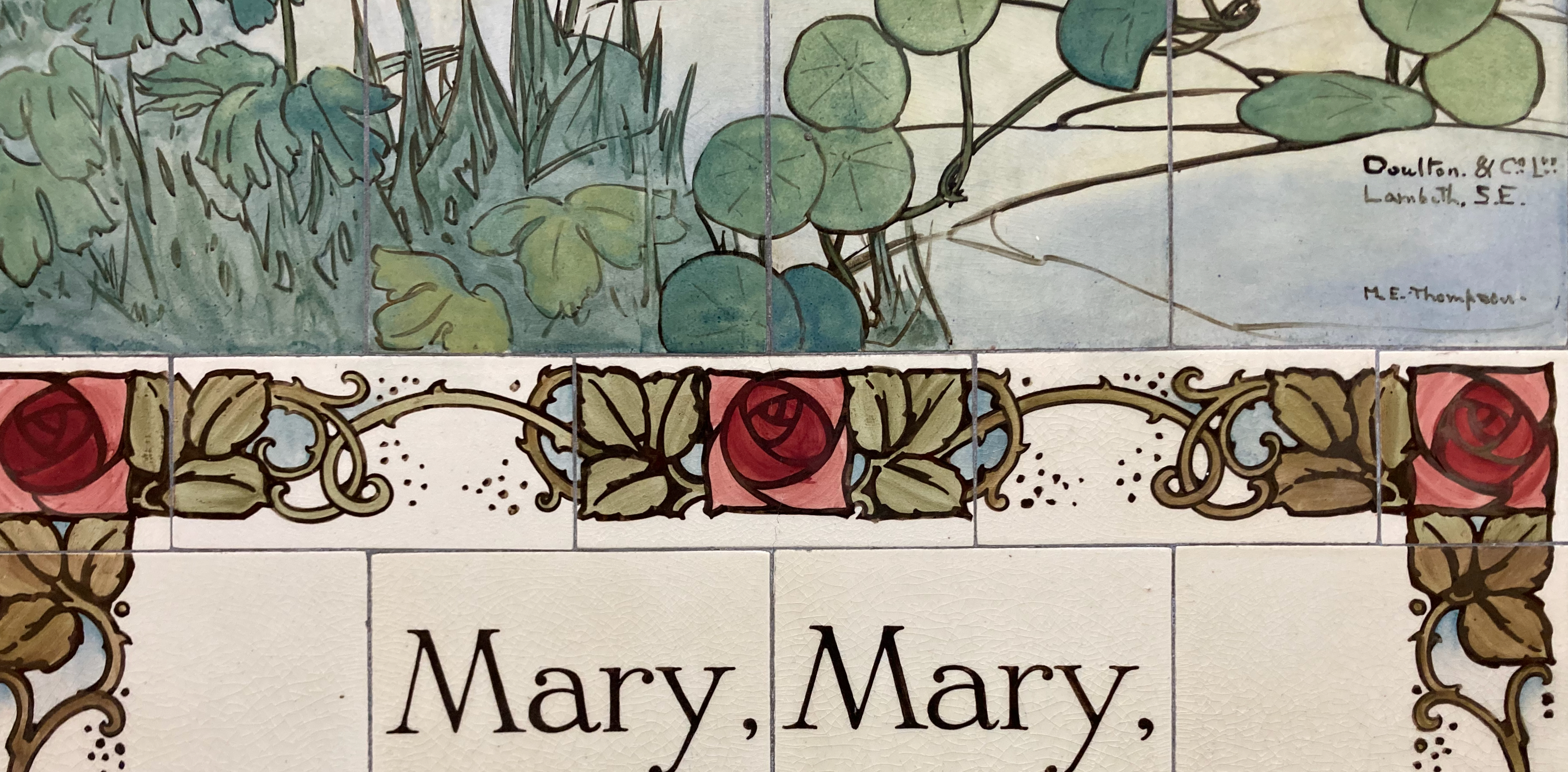
Tile at Wellington Hospital, New Zealand, showing Thompson's signature

Thompson was also an illustrator with her work appearing in The Artist and The Studio magazines and in books such as Miss Mary's little maid by Ellinor Davenport Adams and The Queen Bee and other Nature Stories by Carl Ewald.
