= Joseph A. Kamauoha =

Hawaiian student (1861–1886)

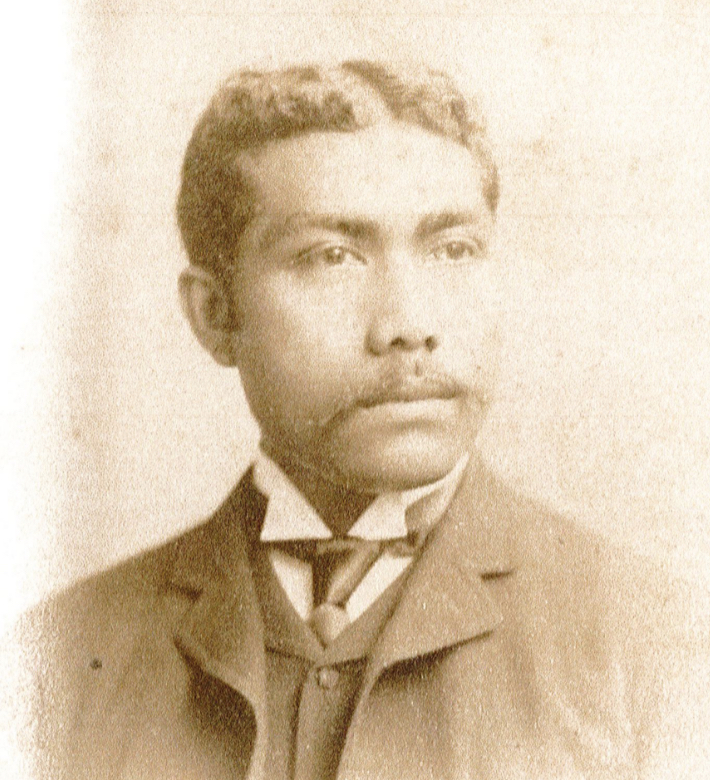
Kamauoha in London, c. 1884

Joseph Aio Arthur Kamauoha (1861 – March 26, 1886) was a Hawaiian student who travelled to London.

He was born in 1861 in Nāpoʻopoʻo, Kona, Hawaiʻi. In 1883, the Hawaiian language newspaper Ke Koo o Hawaii wrote about three Keiki Hawaii Imi Naʻauao, three young men who travelled to London, England to study abroad. One of these your men was named Joseph A. Kaumauoha, a former student of ʻIolani School and Punahou School during 1880-1882. Kamauoha, along with Matthew Makalua and Abraham Piʻianaiʻa traveled to England under the care of Manley Hopkins, His Majesty King Kalākaua's Consul-General in England.

His family genealogy traces back to the time of King Kamehameha I, where one of his kūpuna (grandparent), Panila, was kahuna kālai waʻa (canoe carver) to the Naʻi Aupuni (kingdom), essentially bringing his ʻohana closer to governmental power. Kamauoha was selected by Kalākaua to be a scholar in the Hawaiian Youths Abroad Program, sponsored by the Kingdom of Hawaii. Kamauoha attended the university of King's College London. In his first year at King's College he studied English, Latin, French, and Mathematics and Chemistry, Trigonometry and Mechanics in his second year. He was a serious student and quite shy as Hopkins indicates in his letter to Hawaii, "Kamauoha is prudent, studios and diligent; gives no ground for complaint in any way, but rather dull in conversation; indeed speaks but little".

Kamauohaʻs quiet, humble demeanor was further highlighted in an editorial found in The Globe, a London based newspaper, entitled, "A Modest Rescuer". In the editorial, Hopkins shares a story about a young Hawaiian man who rescues two men who fell off a plank while loading a ship. The Hawaiian man dragged the first man to the wharf and then proceeded to save the other man who fell after. After he saved the two men this Hawaiian man "immediately lost himself in the crowd" and "it was unknown to whom the two lives saved were indebted." Manley Hopkins reveals that this Hawaiian man, who rescued these two men, was Joseph Kamauoha.

Hopkins wrote to King Kalākaua in an October 1885, to say that Kamauoha was "suffering somewhat in health. I wrote that he had had a little trouble with one hand requiring slight operation and that a chill had occasioned an inflammation in his eye. Since then, he has had an attack of pleurisy, not severe, but not yet entirely removed." Unaccustomed to a cold climate, Kamauoha was sent by Hopkins to the costal town of Torquay in Devon. Hopkins refers to this city as the "frying-pan of England" in his February 25, 1886 letter to Kalākaua. Kamauoha made friends in Torquay. He died in Torquay on 26 March 1886. Hopkins wrote that "Very kind friends in the boarding house at Torquay attended his bed-side, and he had every comfort. Thus we lose a fine, promising young man of high moral character".
