= Royal East Sussex Hospital =

Hospital in Hastings, England

Coordinates: 50.8559°N 0.5720°E

The Royal East Sussex Hospital was a healthcare facility based firstly in White Rock Road and from 1923 in Cambridge Road, Hastings, East Sussex.

== History ==
This was founded to care for the poor of Hastings in 1839, on White Rock Road in Hastings. This became known as The General Infirmary. Despite several extensions the hospital became too small, and in 1884 plans were drawn up to rebuild it and the hospital was renamed as Hastings, St Leonards' and East Sussex Hospital. The building was redesigned to better utilise the limited space on the site in a rotunda design. The local MP, Thomas Brassey, who laid the keystone, arrived at the ceremony in his boat "Sunbeam". The new 73 bedded hospital had two circular wings on either side of a central block, and opened in 1887. This hospital closed in 1923, and the newly built Royal East Sussex Hospital was opened in Cambridge Road, Hastings. This provided surgical care and had an accident and emergency department. It closed in 1994 when the Conquest Hospital was opened in St Leonards-on-Sea, Hastings, following the amalgamation of the Eversfield Hospital in St Leonards, and the Buchanan Hospital, St Helens Hospital and the Royal East Sussex Hospital, all in Hastings.

== Notable staff ==
- Ellen Louisa Schlegel R.R.C. (1877–1946), was Matron from 1912 until she resigned in 1928 because of ill health. Schelgel trained under Eva Luckes at Royal London Hospital between 1905 and 1907. After training she worked at The London as a holiday and ward sister before being appointed matron in Sussex. During the First World War, Schlegel was also Acting Commandant Sussex VAD 4. During the war hospital staff were caught breaching the wartime Lighting Order and Miss Schlegel, as Matron and in charge of the building was fined three guineas. Schlegel played a central role when the hospital was rebuilt in 1923 in Cambridge Road. She was well respected and oversaw the implementation of the General Nursing Council's new training scheme following the 1919 Nurses Registration Act.
