= Bexhill Hospital =

Coordinates: 50.8507°N 0.4754°E

- East Sussex Healthcare NHS Trust
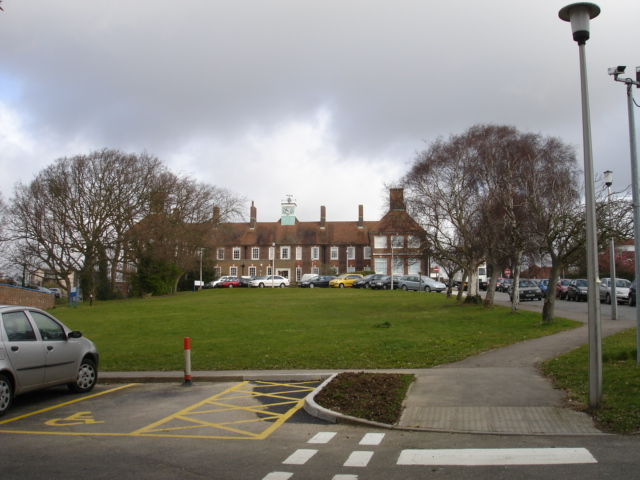
- Bexhill Hospital

- Shown in East Sussex

Geography
- Location: Bexhill-on-Sea, East Sussex, England, United Kingdom

Organisation
- Care system: National Health Service
- Type: District general
- Affiliated university: None
- Patron: None

Services
- Emergency department: No Accident & Emergency

History
- Founded: 1933

Links
- Lists: Hospitals in England

Bexhill Hospital is a National Health Service hospital at Bexhill-on-Sea in East Sussex, England. It is managed by the East Sussex Healthcare NHS Trust.

== History ==
Following a successful fund-raising campaign chaired by Admiral Charles Eustace Anson in the late 1920s, the hospital was built on Holliers Hill and officially opened by Princess Helena Victoria in 1933. The hospital site received four direct hits from German Luftwaffe bombs on one occasion during the Second World War. It joined the National Health Service in 1948.
