= Robert Hoapili Baker =

Hawaiian military officer, courtier, and politician (c. 1845/1847–1900)

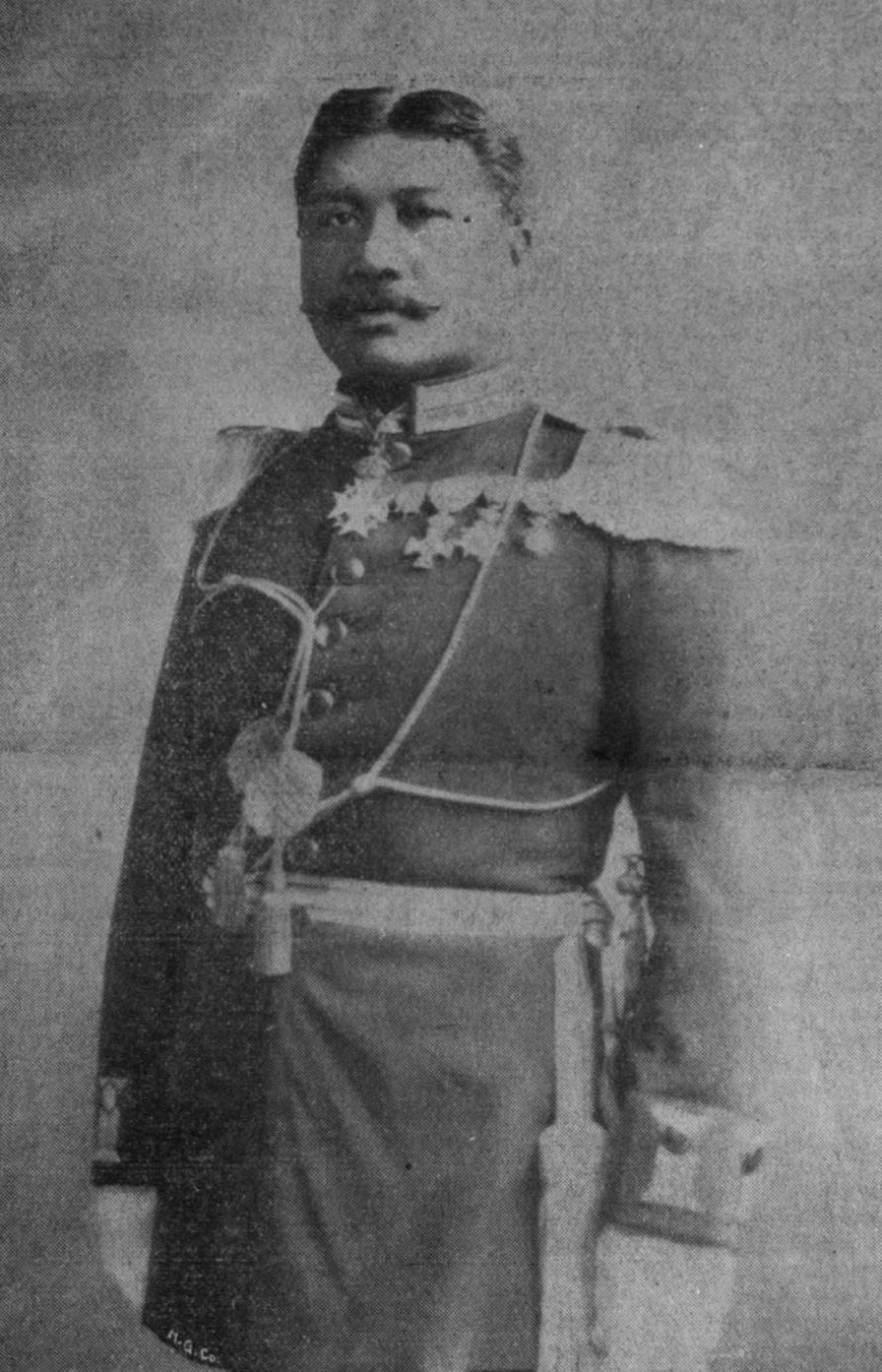

Governor of Maui
- In office October 4, 1886 – August 23, 1888
- Preceded by: John Owen Dominis
- Succeeded by: Thomas Wright Everett

Member of the Kingdom of Hawaii House of Representatives for the district of Kona, Oahu
- In office April 30, 1880 – August 13, 1880

Personal details
- Born: Robert Hoapili Baker c. 1845/1847 Waikapu, Maui, Kingdom of Hawaii
- Died: April 4, 1900 Honolulu, Oahu, Territory of Hawaii
- Resting place: Kawaiahaʻo Church
- Party: Hawaiian National
- Spouse: Emma Kamakanoanoa Merseberg
- Children: 4
- Education: ʻIolani School

Robert Hoapili Kekaipukaʻala Baker (c. 1845/1847 – April 4, 1900) was a Hawaiian ali'i (noble), military officer, courtier, and politician who served many political posts in the Kingdom of Hawaii, including Governor of Maui, Privy Councillor and aide-de-camp to King Kalākaua.

== Birth and lineage ==
Robert Hoapili Baker was born sometime between 1845 and 1847, in Waikapu, on the island of Maui to Malie Napuʻupahoehoe, his mother. According to the Ka Makaainana newspaper in 1896, Hoapili's lineage goes back to the historic ruler of Hawaii Island named Liloa through the House of Moana and a figure named Napuupahoehoe (K). The genealogy shows him as a descendant of ʻIlikiāmoana, the mother of Moana Wahine however, the paper notes that Hoapili's genealogy used the name Hikiamoana and was corrected using the genealogy of Edward Kamakau Lilikalani. The article states that Napuuahoehoe (K) was the father of Malie (w) who married Ikekeleiaiku and had Robert Hoapili Baker however, according to Maui News and The Hawaiian Star dated April 5, 1900, Hoapili's father was Kekeleeiku (k) of Maui. In his book; Return to Kahiki: Native Hawaiians in Oceania by Kealani Cook, the author states that aliʻi wahine, Malie Napuʻupahoehoe had Robert Hoapili Baker with Captain Adam Baker, making him the half brother of John Tamatoa Baker.

Mary Kawena Pukui, created an index of Hawaiian Language Newspaper articles at the Bishop Museum that she felt would be useful to researchers where she indexed Robert Hoapili Baker's genealogy as being in dispute. In 1901 the Pacific Commercial Advertiser published; "Proofs of Royal Lineage of Mrs. Widemann Suppressed During the Lifetime of Judge Widemann" where the genealogy of Mrs. Kaumana Pilahiuilani Widemann is shown in great detail. In response to the claims by Mrs. Widemann, a letter to the paper from Kaikeoewa Palekaluhi Kamehamehanuiailuau was published accusing Mrs. Widemann of fabricating her lineage. In particular Kamehamehanuiailuau questioned the genealogy given for Kamakahelei, the Queen of Kauai. Mrs. Widemann's genealogy for Kamakahelei (w) shows her to have married Kaneoneo (k) and having Lelemaholani (w). Kamehamehanuiailuau believed the queen had two sons, Kaumualii and another named Ikekeleeiku (k) and only one sister he named as Namakaokahai. He contends that Robert Hoapili Baker is the grandson of Kamakahelei.

== Early life, political and military career ==
Under the auspice of Anglican priest Archdeacon George Mason, Hoapili was educated at the Anglican boarding schools: the Luaehu School in Lahaina, Maui and the St. Alban's College in Honolulu. He was educated alongside Samuel Nowlein and Curtis P. Iaukea.

At a young age, Hoapili showed a strong interest in military affair. He began his service to the Hawaiian monarchy as a royal guard officer and became a lieutenant on the Household Guard of King Kalākaua. He was elected to the House of Representative, the lower house of the legislature of the kingdom, for the Kona district of Oahu (around Honolulu). He sat in on the legislative assembly of 1880. During this session, he proposed the creation of a governmentally funded study abroad program which funded the international study of a number of Hawaiian youths from 1880 to 1892 in Italy, Scotland, England, the United States, China and Japan. On August 12, 1884, Kalākaua appointed him as a member of the Privy Council of State.

From October 4, 1886 to August 23, 1888, Hoapili was appointed to succeed John Owen Dominis as Governor of Maui, and the adjacent islands of Molokai and Lanai. He did not hold the post for long. The royal island governorships were abolished by the legislature after the Bayonet Constitution. The king had vetoed the bill, but the new constitutional changes, which limited the king's executive power, allowed the legislature to override his opposition. Hoapili continued serving the king on his Privy Council. On May 15, 1889, he became aide de camp and a member of King Kalākaua's military staff with the military rank of colonel. He continued as a privy councilor and advisor of the king.

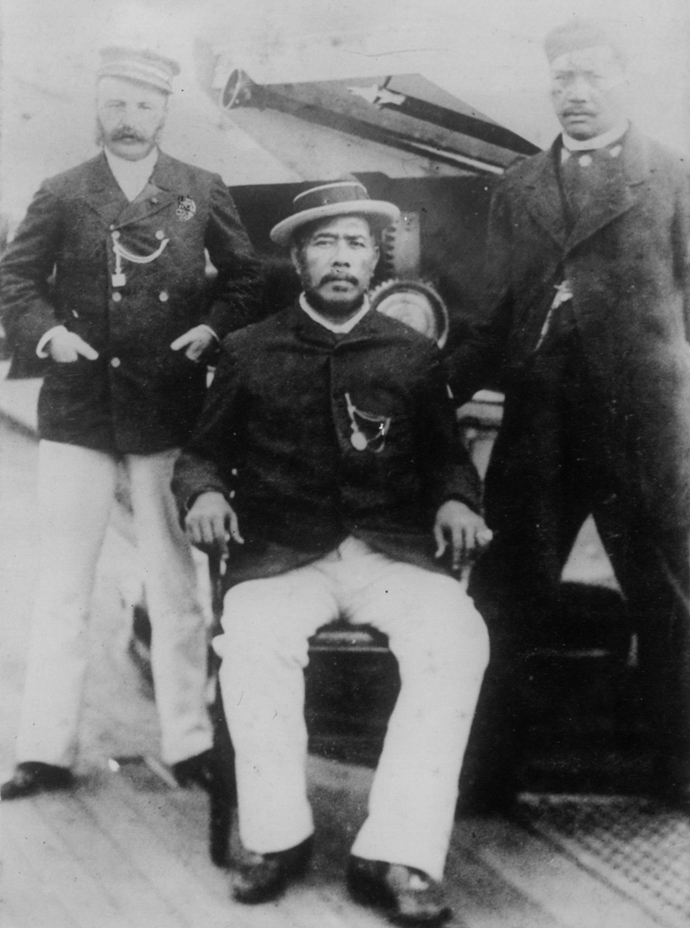
Kalākaua with Colonel Macfarlane and Colonel Hoapili Baker aboard the USS Charleston en route to San Francisco, California

Regarded as a close friend and confidante, Hoapili accompanied the king on his final visit to the United States aboard the USS Charleston, in November 1890. Colonel George W. Macfarlane, the King's Chamberlain, was also part of the suite. While visiting Southern California, the king drank excessively and fell ill in January 1891 and had to be returned to San Francisco. The tearful Hoapili and Macfarlane were at his deathbed at San Francisco's Palace Hotel; he sat at the head of the bed clasping the king's left hand. Shortly before he died, Kalākaua's voice was recorded on a phonograph cylinder. Kalākaua died on January 20, 1891. The recording was given to Hoapili to take back to Honolulu and he reportedly "guarded it as sacredly as his own life". And it is now in the Bernice P. Bishop Museum. Among the chief mourners at King Kalākaua's funeral, Colonel Robert Hoapili Baker stood at the head of the casket and was tasked with carrying the crown, sceptre and sword of the late King during the final procession.

Returning to Honolulu, his military and political commissions were renewed on March 7, 1891, and he remained on the military staff and Privy Council of State of Queen Liliuokalani until the overthrow of the monarchy in 1893. After the overthrow and the establishment of the Republic of Hawaii, Hoapili took the oath to the new regime. During this period, he served as member of the Board of Registration of Electors for Oahu. Otherwise, he remained outside the political arena and retired to a private life.

Hoapili died on April 4, 1900, at his residence in Pawaʻa, Honolulu. He had been ill for a long time before. The cause of the death was heart disease. The Hawaiian community remember favorably his friendship with Kalākaua and lifelong public service to Hawaii and his death was mourned by his family and friends. Local newspapers reported that his death "removes a man of distinguished ancestry and considerable public service". His remains lay in state at the Mililani Hall, his casket draped with the ʻAhu ʻula of his grandmother Kamakahelei, and after a royal funeral befitting his rank, conducted under the rites of the Reorganized Church of Jesus Christ of Latter Day Saints, he was buried at the cemetery of the Kawaiahaʻo Church.

== Personal life ==
Hoapili was originally a member of the Anglican Church of Hawaii but in his later life he converted and joined the Reorganized Church of Jesus Christ of Latter Day Saints. In the 1870s, Hoapili married Emma Kamakanoanoa Merseberg (1856–1913). Their children were Robert Hoapili Kahakumakalima Baker Jr. (1874–1935), who served as Bandmaster for the Royal Hawaiian Band, Elizabeth Kahalelaukoa Baker (1877–1960), later Mrs. Charles W. Booth; Vito (Veto) Baker and Emma Baker, Mrs. James B. Nott. His widow Emma Baker was named sole devisee and executrix of his estate which largely consisted of landholdings in town lots and sugarcane fields around Lahaina on the island of Maui.

== Bibliography ==
- Adler, Jacob (1969). "Kamehameha Statue". The Hawaiian Journal of History. 3. Honolulu: Hawaiian Historical Society: 203–212. hdl:10524/570. OCLC 60626541.
- Hawaii (1918). Lydecker, Robert Colfax (ed.). Roster Legislatures of Hawaii, 1841–1918. Honolulu: Hawaiian Gazette Company. OCLC 60737418.
- Karpiel, Frank (1999). "Notes & Queries – The Hale Naua Society". The Hawaiian Journal of History. 33. Honolulu: Hawaiian Historical Society: 203–212. hdl:10524/509. OCLC 60626541.
- Kuykendall, Ralph Simpson (1967). The Hawaiian Kingdom 1874–1893, The Kalakaua Dynasty. Vol. 3. Honolulu: University of Hawaii Press. ISBN 978-0-87022-433-1. OCLC 500374815.
- Newbury, Colin (2001). "Patronage and Bureaucracy in the Hawaiian Kingdom, 1840–1893". Pacific Studies. 24 (1–2). Laie, HI: Brigham Young University, Hawaii Campus: 1–38. OCLC 607265842. Archived from the original on April 15, 2012.
- Quigg, Agnes (1988). "Kalakaua's Hawaiian Studies Abroad Program". The Hawaiian Journal of History. 22. Honolulu: Hawaiian Historical Society: 170–208. hdl:10524/103. OCLC 60626541.
- Rose, Roger G. (1988). "Woodcarver F. N. Otremba and the Kamehameha Statue". The Hawaiian Journal of History. 22. Honolulu: Hawaiian Historical Society: 131–146. hdl:10524/505. OCLC 60626541.

Government offices
Preceded by John Owen Dominis	Governor of Maui; 1886–1888	Vacant Title next held by Thomas Wright Everett
