= Jonah Kumalae =

American politician (1874–1940)

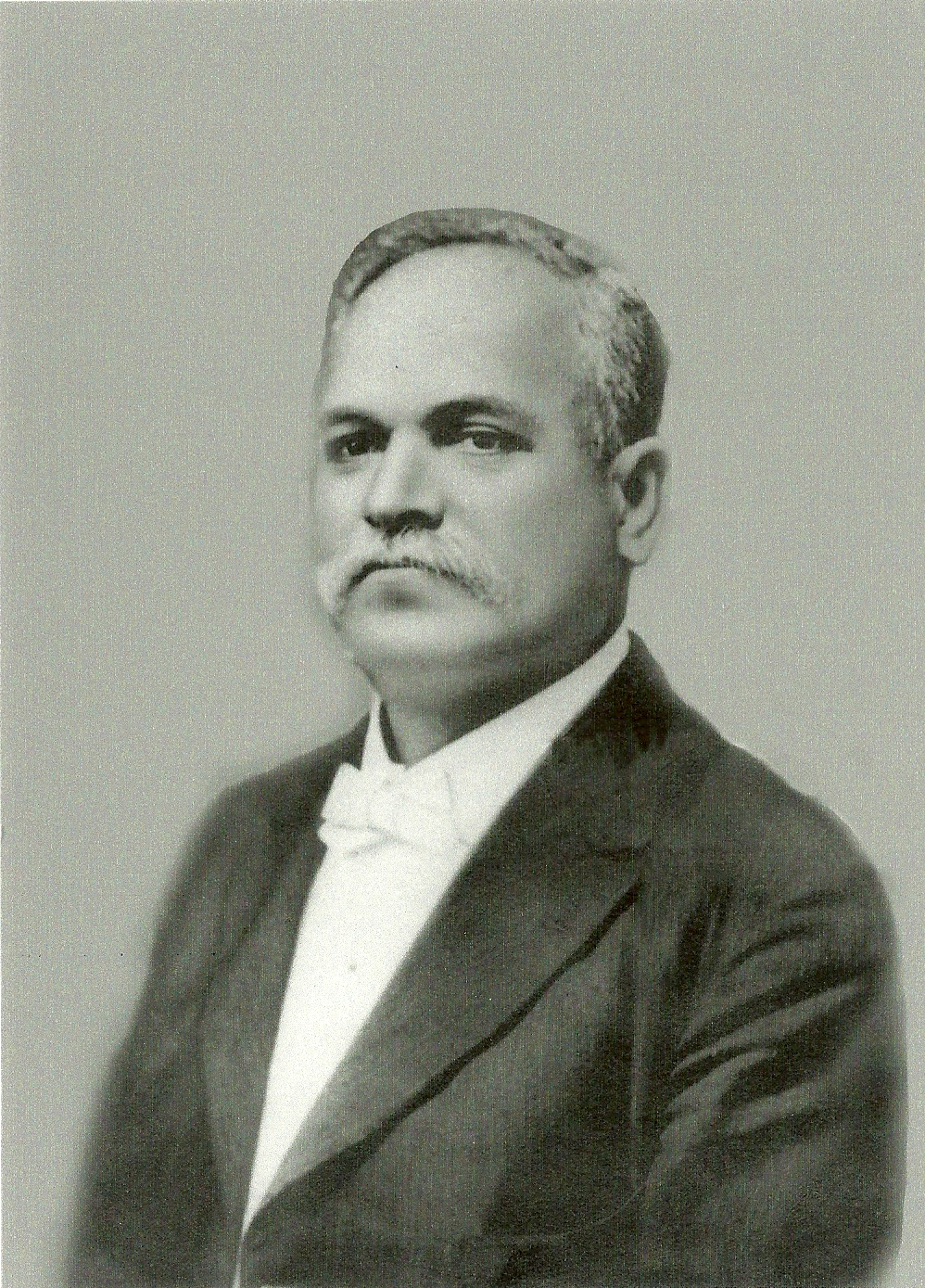
- Born: October 13, 1874; Honolulu, Hawaii
- Died: May 6, 1940 (aged 65); Honolulu, Hawaii
- Occupations: Ukulele maker, businessman
- Political party: Democrat
- Spouse: Lena Ahana (m. 1901)

Headstock seal placed by Jonah Kumalae on his ukuleles, showcasing the 'Gold Award' won at the Panama–Pacific International Exposition

Jonah Kumalae (October 13, 1874 – May 6, 1940) was an American politician, businessman, publisher, ukulele manufacturer, and musician of ethnic Hawaiian origin. Though most noted for manufacturing and marketing his 'Gold Award' Kumalae Ukuleles from 1911 to 1940, he may be best remembered by local Hawaiians for his purchase and relocation of the Spreckels Mansion, former home to Claus Spreckels, sugar industry magnate. In 1921, Kumalae purchased the three-story home with its noted square tower, and then had it relocated piece by piece to its final location on King Street, Honolulu.

== Early life ==
In his younger years, Kumalae worked as a school teacher and agricultural farmer, and poi manufacturer.

== Ukulele manufacturer ==
Ukulele made by Kumalae c. 1910

Kumalae is considered to be the most prolific ukulele manufacturer of his time, producing as many as 300 ukuleles per month at the peak of his business, or possibly as many as 600 per month.

In 1911, Kumalae began making ukuleles in earnest, having been a very accomplished musician. His ukuleles were made of Koa wood, brought over from the Big Island of Hawaii.

In 1915, Kumalae got a big break in his ukulele manufacturing and sales. He applied for, and won, a bid to display his ukuleles at the Panama–Pacific International Exposition of 1915, where his ukulele design won a Gold Award. This enabled Kumalae to market and sell his ukuleles to companies on the U.S. Mainland and, according to many ukulele historians, was instrumental in ushering in a 'new wave' of ukulele and Hawaiian music popularity.

Historians believe that it was Kumalae ukuleles that were given to passengers on island-bound cruise ships in the 1920s, as well as distributed at local hotels. One of these hotels was the famous Royal Hawaiian Hotel, which opened in 1927. Noted ukulele historian and enthusiast Ron Cook documented his work on Kumalae ukuleles that were labeled and sold to guests at the Royal Hawaiian. Cook states that later ukuleles sold at the hotel did not bear the Kumalae label, but are more than likely Kumalae's.

Famous musician and entertainer Tiny Tim Khaury (most noted for his rendition of the song 'Tip Toe through the Tulips') owned a Kumalae ukulele, which was put up for auction by his daughter in 2004, for a reported $2900.

== Newspaper publisher ==
Kumalae owned and published the democratic newspaper Ke Alakai O Hawaii until his death in 1940. The paper was printed in the native Hawaiian language and was, for a time, the only Hawaiian paper in Honolulu.

== Political career ==
A Democrat, Kumalae had a long and distinguished career in Hawaiian politics. He served as a member of the inaugural Territorial Legislature from 1900–1904, and again from 1918–1920. He also served as Food Commissioner, director of the Hawaii Land Company, candidate for Mayor of Honolulu in 1923, and was on the Board of Supervisors from 1919–1923. Kumalae was both active and controversial, known for championing the causes of his native countrymen, and for many clashes with the established government. In 1923, as a Board of Supervisors member, Kumalae allegedly 'stole' a county vehicle. He claimed to have done so to prove the point that county vehicles were being taken home and used by county employees for things other than county business. This claim is supported by the fact that he would later sponsor a bill requiring all government vehicles to bear the phrase, "For Official Use Only," a law that still stands today.

He is also regarded as the 'father' of the Act that made the Flag of Royal Hawaii the official emblem of the Territory of Hawaii.

== Family ==
Jonah Kumalae married Lena Ahana on May 28, 1901, and they had eight children. It has been presented by some historians that his ancestry can be traced to the Maui Royal family, and High Chief Kaehu Kuho'ohei Pahu Paki (known as Paki). He was the son of Moses Keli'ia'a and Laika Manuia, daughter of David Manuia. Manuia was the son of Paki and his first wife, Kaiwi. As was customary at that time, Kumalae took the name of his adoptive (hānai) family.
