= The butterflies and moths of Teneriffe =

- Author: A. E. Holt White
- Illustrator: A. E. Holt White
- Language: English
- Subject: butterflies and moths of Tenerife
- Genre: Non-fiction
- Published: 1894
- Publisher: L. Reeve & Co.
- Media type: Hardcover
- Pages: 108
- ISBN: 1117411826
- OCLC: 16164418

The butterflies and moths of Teneriffe is a non-fiction book written by A. E. Holt White, and edited by Rashleigh Holt White. Released on December 19, 1893, it was published in London by L. Reeve and Co. with a publication date of 1894. There are 108 pages, with four plates, and 23 coloured figures from the author's drawings. The book is dedicated to Elizabeth Mary Odling, the daughter of Alfred Smee of Carshalton, who produced a book entitled My Garden.

== Synopsis ==
Mrs. Holt White was a connection by marriage of Gilbert White, of Selborne. Her husband, Rashleigh Holt-White, vice-president of the Selborne Society, edited the book. Previous to Holt White's book, the principal sources of information regarding the Canaries were Webb and Berthelot's Histoire Naturelle des Iles Canariennes, in which 20 butterflies and 33 moths were enumerated, and a paper by Alpheraky in the fifth volume of Romanoff's Mémoires sur les Lépidoptères, noticing 57 species, of which 17 were butterflies, several of which were figured.

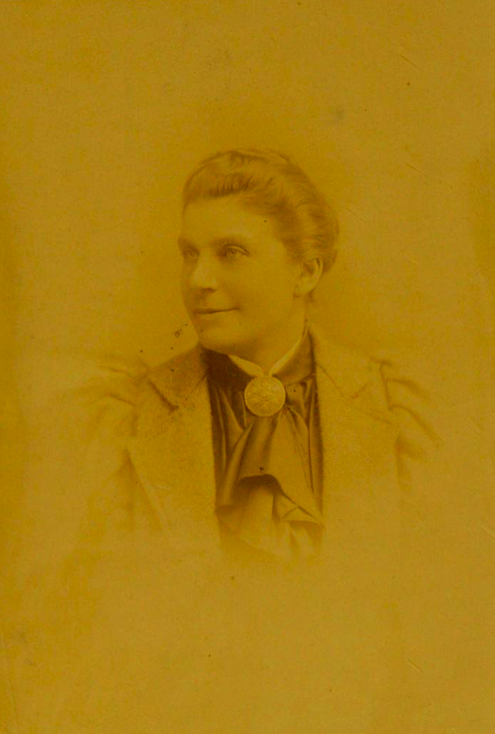
A. E. Holt-White's portrait photo preceding the title page

Mrs. Holt White spent the winter of 1892–93 in Teneriffe, and published the result of her observations on the lepidopterous fauna of the island in a popular and unpretentious volume. The author took up the collecting of butterflies and moths while visiting Tenerife for her health, and not finding any available manual on the subject, compiled the book. Though it is written for the use of amateurs, it contains a fairly complete account of the larger Lepidoptera of a small region. The catalogue of the lepidoptera, though dealing specially with the larger lepidoptera, gives lists of the few micros known to occur in that island while Holt White was a visitor.

== Content ==
The introductory chapter sketching briefly the characters and life histories of the Lepidoptera is considered to be the least satisfactory part of the book. The hints and suggestions, and the directions for the killing, setting and relaxing of specimens are generally good.

Twenty-nine butterflies and thirty-four moths are briefly characterized, and there are frequent notes on their comparative abundance, habits, early stages and food-plants. In addition, there is a list of twenty-eight moths, most of them recorded on the authority of Alphéraky in his paper, "Zur Lepidopteren-Fauna von Teneriffa", in the fifth volume of Romanoff's Mémoires sur les Lépidoptēres; these, principally microlepidoptera, are considered by Holt White as of little interest to the ordinary collector.

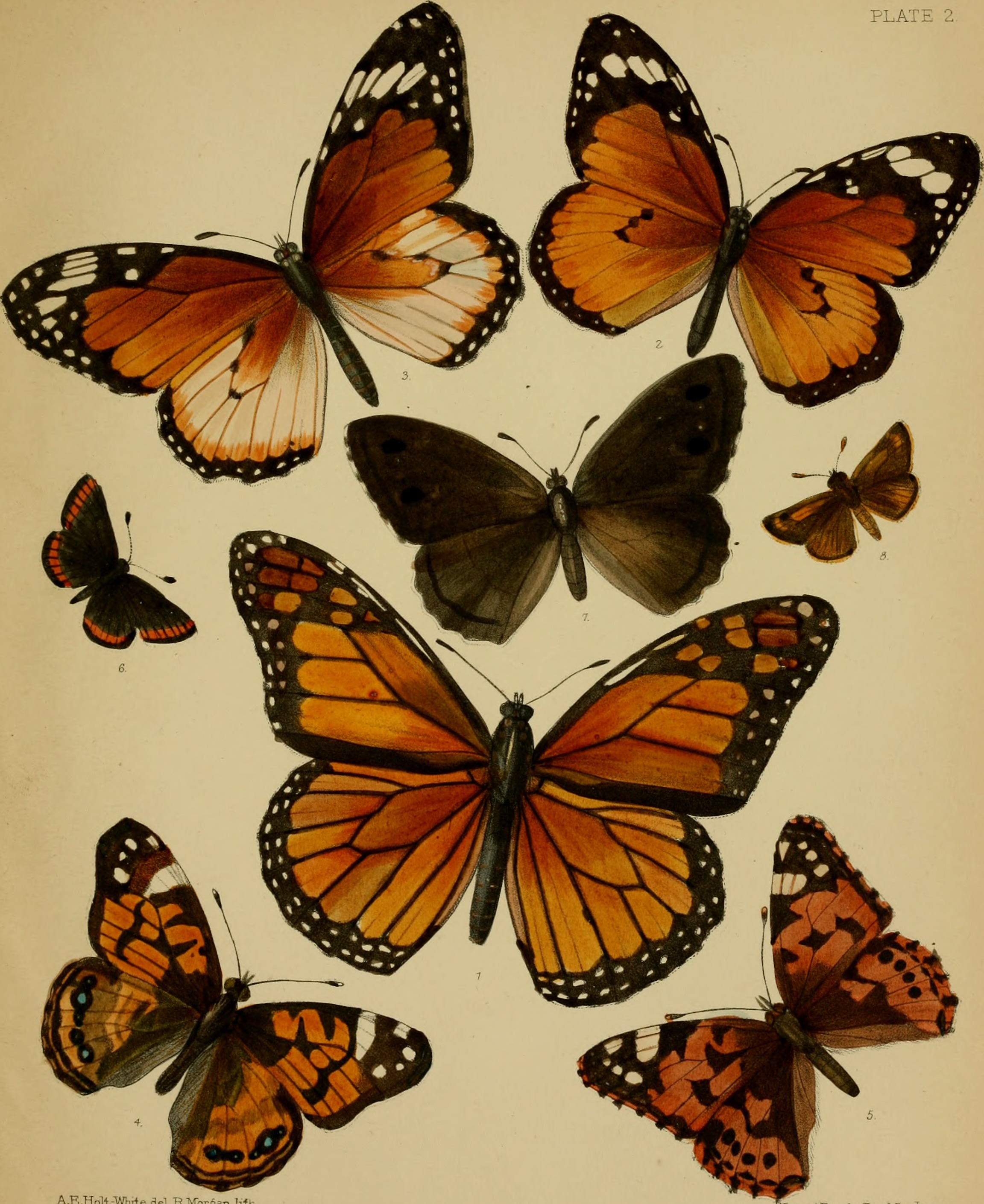
Lepidoptera illustrations in the book

The four plates give good, recognizable figures of twenty butterflies and eleven moths; the coloring, though in some cases somewhat rough, is always effective.

Several species are figured in this book for the first time, and a detailed account is given of the little-known Arctiid, Rhyporioides rufescens, Brullé, which is peculiar to the Canaries, in all its stages. An interesting species figured by Holt White was Euchloe charlonia, a species previously known from North Africa and Western Asia (not North and West Africa); and among the moths was noticed a figure of Rhyperioides rufescens, described, but not figured, by Brullé, in Webb and Berthelot's work, and several other species peculiar to the islands.

== Reception ==
The Athenaeum (1896) considered it to be a pleasant record of natural observations, with an absence of original information, resembling much of the earlier publications of the Revs. F. O. Morris and J. G. Wood. That review also mentioned that it was unfortunate that the author wrote the "Introductory Chapter" as technical knowledge comes not by compilatione. A further regret mentioned that the system of nomenclature was inconsistent.
