= Kamanawa =

Hawaiian high chief

- On the left is Kamanawa
- Died: c. 1802?
- Spouse: Kekelaokalani; Kekuʻiapoiwa II
- Issue: Koahou; Noukana; Amamalua; Peleuli Kekelaokalani; Piʻipiʻi Kalanikaulihiwakama
- Father: Keawepoepoe
- Mother: Kanoena

Kamanawa (died c. 1802?) was a Hawaiian high chief and early supporter of King Kamehameha I, known as one of the royal Nīʻaupiʻo twins with his brother Kameʻeiamoku. He later became the stepfather of Kamehameha by marrying his mother.

== Life ==
Kamanawa's father was Keawepoepoe. His mother was Kanoena, sister of his father. His namesake grandnephew Kamanawa II (grandson of his twin) was grandfather of the last two ruling monarchs of the Kingdom. The name ka manawa (sometimes spelled "Ka-manawa") means "the season" in the Hawaiian language.

His first wife was named the High Chiefess Kekelaokalani of Maui, the daughter of his aunt, Queen Kekuiapoiwanui of Maui, by her second marriage to High Chief Kauakahiakua-o-Lono of Maui. His second wife was Chiefess Kekuʻiapoiwa II, the mother of Kamehameha I. He had three sons: Koahou, Noukana, and Amamalua from his first wife. He also has a daughter Peleuli, who became a consort of King Kamehameha, by his first wife and a daughter Piʻipiʻi Kalanikaulihiwakama by his second wife.

Since his double grandmother Kalanikauleleiaiwi was Kamehameha's great-grandmother, they were half-cousins once removed by blood. However, he was also father-in-law and stepfather to Kamehameha, so was called his uncle.

In 1794, Kamanawa was one of the six principal chiefs under Kamehameha I and ruled the district of Hilo in his name. He most likely died around 1802.

== Ancestry ==
Keawepoepoe family tree

Family tree based on Abraham Fornander's; "An Account of the Polynesian Race" and other works from the author, Queen Liliuokalani's; "Hawaii's Story by Hawaii's Queen", Samuel Mānaiakalani Kamakau's; "Ruling Chiefs of Hawaii" and other works by the author, John Papa ʻĪʻī's; "Fragments of Hawaiian History", Edith Kawelohea McKinzie's; "Hawaiian Genealogies: Extracted from Hawaiian Language Newspapers, Vol. I & II", Kanalu G. Terry Young's; "Rethinking the Native Hawaiian Past", Charles Ahlo, Jerry Walker, and Rubellite Kawena Johnson's; "Kamehameha's Children Today", The Hawaiian Historical Society Reports, the genealogies of the Hawaiian Royal families in Kingdom of Hawaii probate, the works of Sheldon Dibble and David Malo as well as the Hawaii State Archive genealogy books.
(k) = Kane (Hawaiian for male or husband). (w) = Wahine (female or wife). Hawaiian genealogies use these as indicators for gender instead of (m) and (f)

Kauihi-a-Hiwa (k) | Kueluakawai (w)
Kealohi kanakamaikai (k) | Kaneiahaka (w)
Kainaaila (k) | Kapulauki (w) | Kauākahikua ʻanaʻauakāne (w) | Iwikauikaua (k) | Keakamahana (w)
Kauakahilau (k) | Kuluina (w) | Kāneikaiwilani (k) | Keākealaniwahine (w) | Kanaloakapulehu (k) | Ahu-a-ʻI (k) | Piʻilaniwahine (w)
Kamuokaumeheiwa (w) | Lonoikahaupu (k) | Kalanikauleleiaiwi (w) | Kauaua-a-Mahi (k) | Keaweʻīkekahi aliʻiokamoku (k) | Lonomaʻaikanaka (w)
Kaumeheiwa (k) | Kaʻapuwai (w) | Keawepoepoe (k) | Kūmaʻaikū (w) | Kanoena (w) | Haʻae-a-mahi (k) | Kekelakekeokalani (w) | Kalanikeʻeaumoku (k) | Kamakaimoku (w) | Kalaninuiamamao (k)
Kaeokulani (k) | Kamakahelei (w) | Kameʻeiamoku (k) | Kamakaʻeheikuli (w) | Keeaumoku; Pāpaiahiahi (k) | Nāmāhānaʻi Kaleleokalani (w) | Kamanawa (k) | Kekelaokalani (w) | Kekuʻiapoiwa II (w) | Keōua (k) | Kalola Pupuka (w) | Kalaniʻōpuʻu (k)
Kapuaamohu (w) | Kaumualii (k) | Kepookalani (k) | Alapai Wahine (w) | Keohohiwa (w) | Kaheiheimālie (w) | Namahana Piʻia (w) | Peleuli (w) | Kamehameha I (k) | Kekuiapoiwa Liliha (w) | Kīwalaʻō (k)
Kaʻahumanu (w) | Kalaʻimamahu (k) | Kahōʻanokū Kīnaʻu (k) | Wahinepio (w) | Palila Nohomualani (k) | Moana (w) | Keōpūolani (w)
Kinoiki Kekaulike (w) | Kūhiō Kalanianaʻole (k) | Kealiʻiahonui (k) | Kekauʻōnohi (w) | Levi Haʻalelea (k) | Eia (k) | Kauwā (w)
Kamanawa II (k) _{(c. 1785 – October 20, 1840)} (Note: Forbes-1998-p. 256 "Twelve days after the first Hawaiian Constitution was signed, a chief, Kamanawa II, grandfather of future monarchs David Kalakaua and Lydia Makaeha Liliuokalani, was hung for the murder of his wife. The method used was poison, and after a trial by jury, Kamanawa and Lonoapuakau (spelled Lonopuakau in title), captain of the Hawaiian vessel Hooikaika, were convicted. The sentence of death was set by the premier (Kekauluohi) and agreed upon by the king only after a long consultation with Commander Charles Wilkes of the United States Exploring Expedition. This is the printed order setting the date of execution for October 20, 1840.") | Kamokuiki (w) _{(died 1840)} (Note: Yalom-2008-p. 241 "Kamokuiki Died 1840") | ʻAikanaka (k) _{(died 1837)} (Note: Andrews-1865-p. 557 "1837. Aikanaka died.") | Kamaʻeokalani (w) | Iʻahuʻula (w) | Naihekukui (k)
Kapaakea (k) _{(1815 – November 13, 1866)} (Note: Forbes-1998-p. 428 "[Caesar Kapaakea] He died in Honolulu on November 13, 1866") | Keohokālole (w) _{(died April 6, 1869)} (Note: Stauffer-2004-p. 61 "[Keohokālole] died in Hilo on April 6, 1869.") | Kekāuluohi (w) _{(c. 1794 (Note: Kamehiro-2009- p. 61 "High Chiefess Kekāuluohi (ca. 1794–1845), premier, wife of Kamehameha I, and mother of King Lunalilo, built her house at this site, on the premises known as Pohukaina") – June 7, 1845 (Note: Kam - 2017- p.205 "Hawaiian Gazette lists “Kekauluohi, Mother of Lunalilo, died June 7, 1845."))} | Charles Kanaʻina (k) _{(May 4, 1798 – March 13, 1877)} | Kamāmalu (w) _{(c. 1802–1824)} | Kamehameha II (k) _{(c. 1797 – July 14, 1824)} | Kīnaʻu (w) _{(c. 1805 – April 4, 1839)} | Kekūanaōʻa (k) _{(c. 1791 – November 24, 1868)} | Kamehameha III (k) _{(March 17, 1814 – December 15, 1854)} | Kalama (w) (_{1817–September 20, 1870)}
Kapiʻolani (w) _{(December 31, 1834 – June 24, 1899)} | Kalākaua (k) _{(November 16, 1836 – January 20, 1891)} | Liliʻuokalani (w) _{(September 2, 1838 – November 11, 1917)} | John Owen Dominis (k) _{(March 10, 1832 – August 23, 1891)} | Lunalilo (k) _{(January 31, 1835 – February 3, 1874)}
