= Jonah Piʻikoi =

Hawaiian high chief

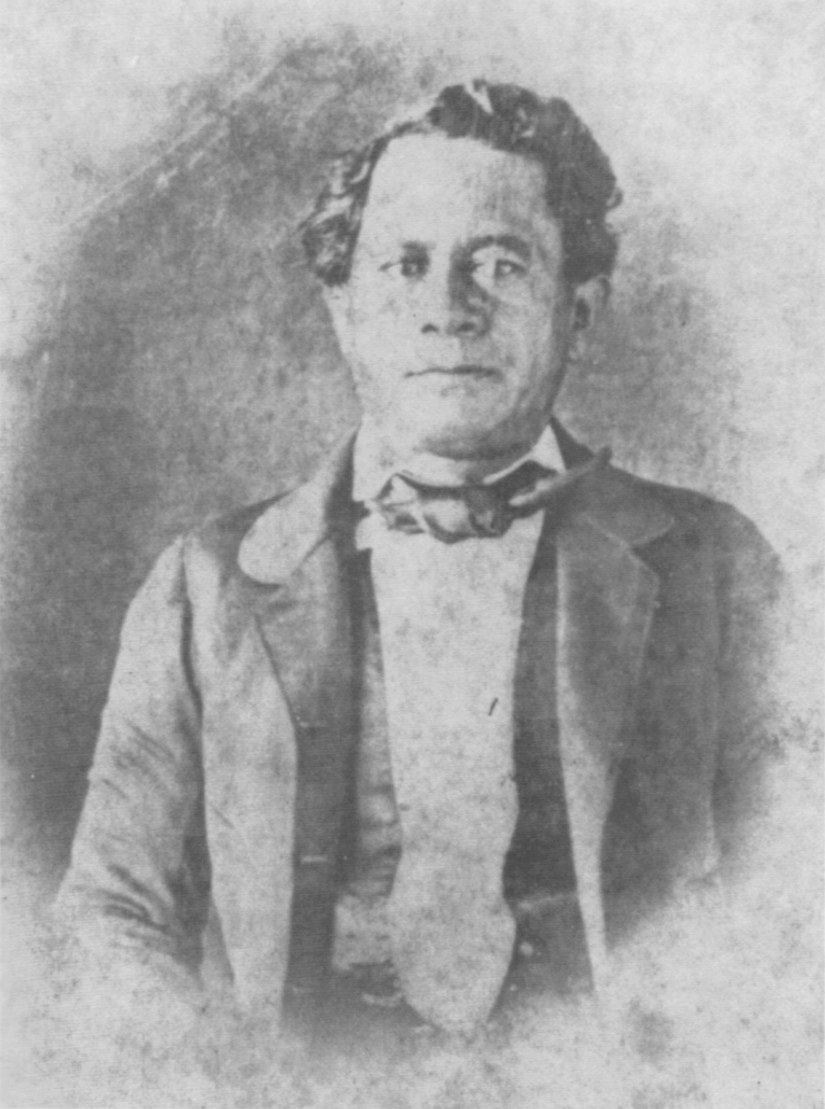
- Born: January 1804; Waimea, Kauaʻi
- Died: April 26, 1859 (aged 55); Honolulu, Oahu, Kingdom of Hawaii
- Resting place: Kewalo
- Spouses: Kekahili; Kamakeʻe
- Children: Lydia Piʻikoi; Maria Piʻikoi Cummins; David Kahalepouli Piʻikoi

Jonah Piʻikoi (January, 1804 – April 26, 1859), also spelled Iona Piʻikoi, was a Hawaiian high chief and served as a statesman during the Kingdom of Hawaii.

== Life ==
According to Piʻikoi himself, he was born in the month of Ikuwā, around January 1804, at Waimea on the island of Kauaʻi. Piʻikoi's parents were Kawahinemakua and Kiko. He was a kaukau aliʻi, of lower-ranking chiefly descent, but a relative of the Kings of Kauaʻi. His great-grandmother Kahalemanuolono was the sister of Kamakahelei, making Piʻikoi a distant cousin of King Kaumualiʻi of Kauaʻi. His Hawaiian name Piʻikoi translate as "lofty aspirations."

Piʻikoi began public service as a tobacco lighter of King Kaumualiʻi and later King Kamehameha II. He accompanied Kamehameha II to Oʻahu in 1822, serving as his personal attendant. Returning to Kauaʻi after Kamehameha II's departure to Great Britain, Piʻikoi assisted the newly appointed Governor Kahalaiʻa Luanuʻu in suppressing Humehume's rebellion in 1824. Returning to Oʻahu, he served Kahalaiʻa until his death in 1826 and afterward became a servant of Kamehameha III. Piʻikoi became a konohiki or land agent for Kamehameha III's lands on Oʻahu and gain much profit from managing the land. During the Great Māhele, he was given the duty of separating the King's land from that of the chiefs' He would later serve in the House of Nobles 1845–1859 and on the Privy Council 1852–1855.

Piʻikoi died at his Fort street residence in Honolulu, on April 26, 1859. He was in his fifties and his cause of death was described as aneurysm of the aorta. Before his death, he wrote an autobiography Sketch of J. Piikoi's Life which was published by the Pacific Commercial Advertiser on May 12, 1859. His funeral was dated to May 16 and buried in a family tomb near his country residence on the plains of Kewalo.

Piʻikoi Street in Honolulu is named after either him or his son. He once owned a large section of around the area where, the land between Waikiki and Honolulu, called the Kewalo area. Piʻikoi built the first two-story wooden house in Kewalo, which is now near the President William McKinley High School.

== Marriage and children ==
Piʻikoi's first wife was Kekahili, daughter of Kamokuiki, and half-sister of High Chief Kapaʻakea. With Kekahili, he had High Chief David Kahalepouli Piʻikoi, the father of David Kawānanakoa, Edward Abnel Keliʻiahonui, and Jonah Kūhiō Kalanianaʻole, who shared his grandfather's Christian name.

His second wife Kamakeʻe (died 1871) was the daughter of Ihu and Keʻekapu. They had two daughters: Lydia (Lilia) Piʻikoi (died 1900) and Maria (Maraea) Piʻikoi (1848–1874). Lydia married three times, to William S. Wond, John Ena and Samuel K. Kamakaia, and her only son was William Piʻikoi Wond (1864–1887), a member of the Royal Hawaiian Band. Lydia's obituary in 1900 called her a daughter of Kekahili instead. Maria was married to Thomas Jefferson Cummins, half-brother of John Adams Cummins, and had three daughters: Lydia Kekaulike Cummins, Elizabeth Kamakeʻe Cummins, and Maria Maiopili Cummins. After Piʻikoi's death, his widow Kamakeʻe remarried to W. P. Kamakau.

An unnamed daughter or two daughters died in the 1848 measles epidemic.

=== Family tree ===
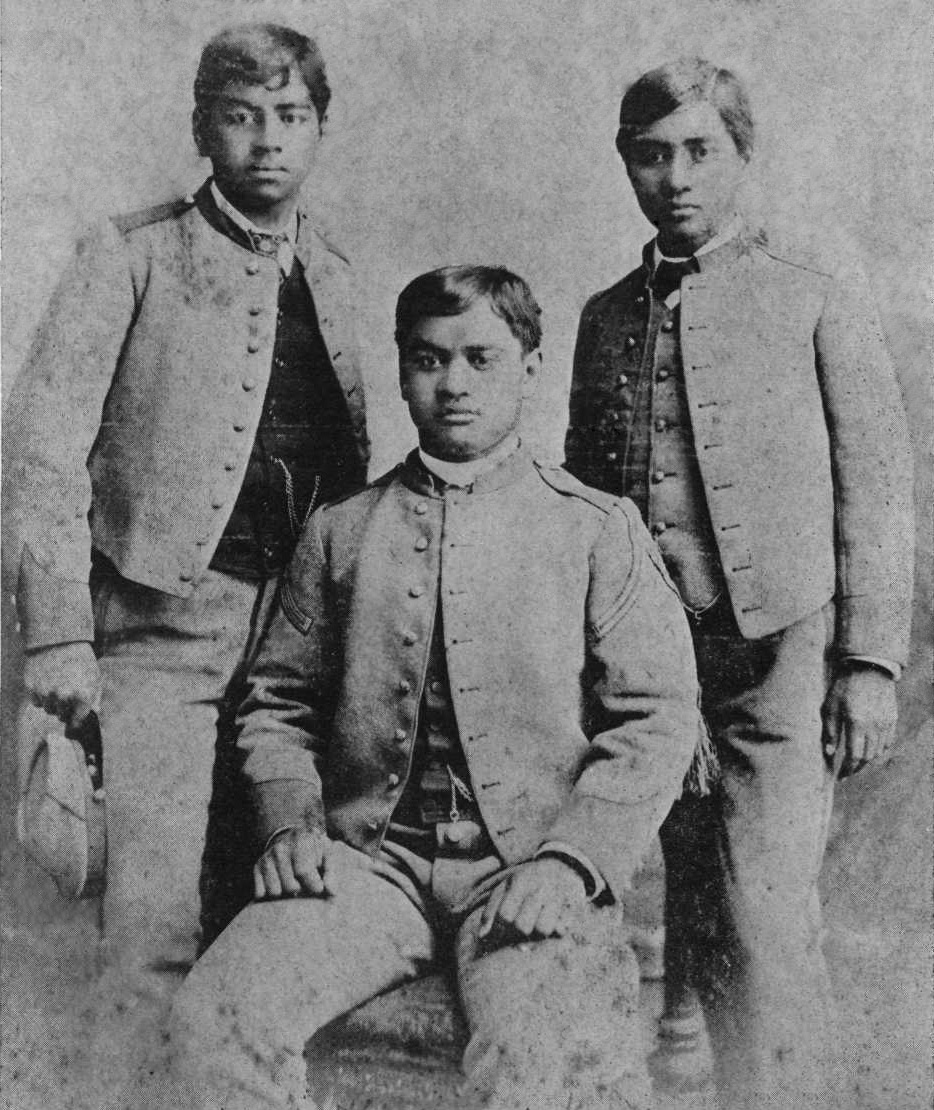
Grandsons of Jonah Piʻikoi at San Mateo. Left to right: Kalanianaʻole, Kawānanakoa and Keliʻiahonui

Kamakeʻe (d. 1871)	Jonah Piʻikoi (1804–59)	Kekahili
Lydia Piʻikoi (d. 1901)	William S. Wond (1841–1932)	Maria Piʻikoi (1848–74)	Thomas Jefferson; Cummins (1826–1903)	David Kahalepouli; Piʻikoi (1845–80)	Victoria; Kinoiki Kekaulike (1843–84)
William Piʻikoi; Wond (1864–87)	Lydia Kekaulike; Cummins	Elizabeth Kamakeʻe; Cummins	Maria Maiopili; Cummins	David Kawānanakoa (1868–1908)	Edward Abnel; Keliʻiahonui (1869–87)	Jonah Kūhiō; Kalanianaʻole (1871–1922)
House of Kawānanakoa

== Bibliography ==
- Cooke, Amos Starr; Cooke, Juliette Montague (1937). Richards, Mary Atherton (ed.). The Chiefs' Children School: A Record Compiled from the Diary and Letters of Amos Starr Cooke and Juliette Montague Cooke, by Their Granddaughter Mary Atherton Richards. Honolulu: Honolulu Star-Bulletin. OCLC 1972890.
- Forbes, David W., ed. (2001). Hawaiian National Bibliography, 1780-1900. Vol. 3. Honolulu: University of Hawaii Press. ISBN 0-8248-2503-9.
- Kameʻeleihiwa, Lilikalā (1992). Native Land and Foreign Desires. Honolulu: Bishop Museum Press. ISBN 0-930897-59-5.
- McKinzie, Edith Kawelohea (1983). Stagner, Ishmael W. (ed.). Hawaiian Genealogies: Extracted from Hawaiian Language Newspapers. Vol. 1. Honolulu: University of Hawaii Press. ISBN 0-939154-28-5.
- Pukui, Mary Kawena; Elbert, Samuel H.; Mookini, Esther T. (1974). Place Names of Hawaii. Honolulu: University of Hawaii Press. ISBN 978-0-8248-0524-1.
