= Bennett Nāmākēhā =

Hawaiian high chief (c. 1799–1860)

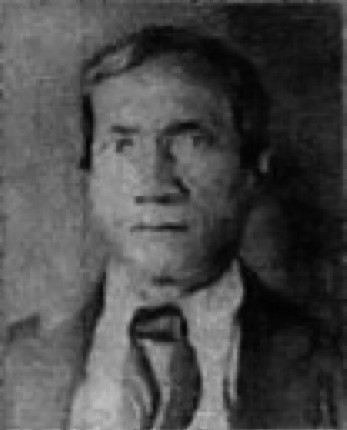
- Born: c. 1799
- Died: December 27, 1860 (aged 61); Pauoa Valley, Honolulu, Oahu
- Burial: December 31, 1860; Pohukaina Tomb; October 30, 1865; Mauna ʻAla Royal Mausoleum
- Spouse: Halauwai; Lydia Piʻia; Kapiʻolani
- Issue: Hinau; Kahaekalaunu
- Bennett Nāmākēhāokalani
- Father: Kamaunu
- Mother: Kukaeleiki

Bennett Nāmākēhā-o-kalani (c. 1799–1860) was a Hawaiian high chief, uncle of Queen Emma of Hawaii, and first husband of Queen Kapiolani. His first name is often given as Benjamin, Beneli, or Beniki.

== Life ==
He and his brother George Naea were sons of High Chief Kamaunu and High Chiefess Kukaeleiki, the daughter of Kalauawa from the royal line of Kauaian chiefs. Kukaeleiki was also cousin of Queen Keōpūolani. His name was the same as the high chief who rebelled against Kamehameha I during the end of his military career in 1796. His brother Naʻea was the father of Queen Emma.

He was a member of the House of Nobles from about 1848 through 1855. By 1851 the House of Nobles consisted only of petty chiefs called Kaukaualiʻi. Nāmākēhā was inferior to the aliʻi nui (High Chiefs). Kaukaualiʻi were only descended from famous fathers while aliʻi nui claim parentage of mother of the highest rank.

Prior to 1852, he was married to Halauwai and later Lydia Piʻia, daughter of Kekaikuihala, the daughter of Nuhi and Kaohelelani. With Halauwai, he had a son Hinau who married Kamakaaiau, an attendant of Queen Emma. With Piʻia, he had another son named Kahaekalaunu, who died in infancy. On March 8, 1852 he married Kapiʻolani, daughter of Kūhiō Kalanianaʻole and Kinoiki Kekaulike. His second wife was only eighteen years old while he was more than thirty years her senior. Through that marriage she became Queen Emma's aunt and nurse to her son Prince Albert Edward Kauikeaouli. Nāmākēhā and Kapiʻolani had no children. For his health the couple voyaged for months on The Morning Star, a missionary vessel, among the Gilbert Islands, but in vain, for Nāmākēhā died on December 27, 1860, at Honolulu. His widow later remarried to Kalākaua and became the Queen consort of Hawaii in 1874.

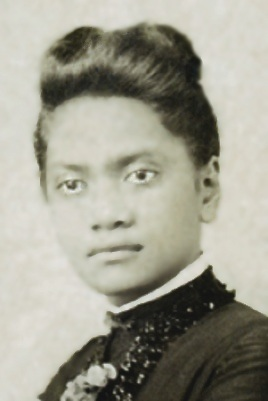
Nāmākēhā's granddaughter Stella Keomailani

Initially buried in the Pohukaina Tomb, located on grounds of ʻIolani Palace, his remains were later transported along with those of other royals in a midnight torchlight procession on October 30, 1865, to the newly constructed Royal Mausoleum at Mauna ʻAla in the Nuʻuanu Valley. In 1904, after the Mausoleum building became too crowded, the coffins belonging to Robert Crichton Wyllie and the relatives of Queen Emma including Nāmākēhā's were moved to the newly built Wylie Tomb. The name "Bennet Namakeha" was inscribed on the ʻewa (west) side of the monument above his final resting place.

His line died out with his granddaughter Stella Keomailani (1866–1927), daughter of Hinau and Kamakaaiau, who was married to James Dawson Cockett and later to Edwin K. Kea.

== Bibliography ==
- Alexander, William DeWitt (1894). "The "Hale o Keawe" at Honaunau, Hawaii". Journal of the Polynesian Society. 3. London: E. A. Petherick: 159–161.
- Bingham, Hiram (1855) [1848]. A Residence of Twenty-one Years in the Sandwich Islands (Third ed.). Canadaigua, NY: H. D. Goodwin.
- Hawaii (1918). Lydecker, Robert Colfax (ed.). Roster Legislatures of Hawaii, 1841-1918. Honolulu: Hawaiian Gazette Company.
- Judd, Walter F. (1975). Palaces and Forts of the Hawaiian Kingdom: From Thatch to American Florentine. Palo Alto, CA: Pacific Books. ISBN 0870152165.
- Kaeo, Peter; Queen Emma (1976). Korn, Alfons L. (ed.). News from Molokai, Letters Between Peter Kaeo & Queen Emma, 1873–1876. Honolulu: The University Press of Hawaii. ISBN 978-0-8248-0399-5.
- Kanahele, George S. (1999). Emma: Hawaii's Remarkable Queen. Honolulu: University of Hawaii Press. ISBN 0-8248-2240-4.
- McKinzie, Edith Kawelohea (1983). Stagner, Ishmael W. (ed.). Hawaiian Genealogies: Extracted from Hawaiian Language Newspapers. Vol. 1. Honolulu: University of Hawaii Press. ISBN 0-939154-28-5.
- McKinzie, Edith Kawelohea (1986). Stagner, Ishmael W. (ed.). Hawaiian Genealogies: Extracted from Hawaiian Language Newspapers. Vol. 2. Honolulu: University of Hawaii Press. ISBN 0-939154-37-4.
- Osorio, Jon Kamakawiwoʻole (2002). Dismembering Lāhui: A History of the Hawaiian Nation to 1887. Honolulu: University of Hawaii Press. ISBN 0-8248-2549-7.
- Parker, David Paul (2008). "Crypts of the Ali`i The Last Refuge of the Hawaiian Royalty". Tales of Our Hawaiʻi (PDF). Honolulu: Alu Like, Inc. Archived from the original (PDF) on 2013-11-11.
- Thrum, Thomas G., ed. (1904). Kamehameha Tomb. Honolulu: Honolulu Star-Bulletin. p. 180.
