= Hiram Kahanawai =

Hawaiian high chief

Personal details
- Born: September 1837 Luaʻehu, Lahaina, Maui, Kingdom of Hawaii
- Died: August 7, 1874 (aged 36) Honolulu, Oʻahu, Kingdom of Hawaiʻi
- Resting place: Oʻahu Cemetery
- Spouse: Poʻomaikelani

Military service
- Allegiance: Kingdom of Hawaiʻi
- Branch/service: Hawaiian Army
- Rank: Captain
- Unit: Household Troops

Hiram Kahanawai, also known as Hairama Kahanawai, (September 1837 – August 7, 1874) was a member of the Hawaiian nobility who served as a retainer and household steward of King Kamehameha IV and his widow Queen Emma of Hawaiʻi. He married the future Princess Poʻomaikelani, and they joined the court of King Kalākaua after he won the royal election of 1874 against Queen Emma.

== Life and career ==
Hiram Kahanawai was born in September 1837, at Luaʻehu, Lahaina, on the island of Maui, to Kaʻaha and Kamaile. His paternal grandmother Kahikaheana was a trusted kahu (caretaker) who served the family of Kalaʻimamahū, a brother of King Kamehameha I, and his daughter Kekāuluohi. He was also a relative of Queen Emma of Hawaiʻi, by a junior line of descent, and distant relative of the family of Kalākaua and Liliuokalani. During the Great Māhele of 1848, his father received the land allotments on the islands of Oʻahu, Maui and Kauaʻi, including half of the ʻili of Kawananakoa in Honolulu, the ahupuaʻa of Kaulalo near Lahaina, and the ʻili of Kuiloa near Hanapepe. Kaʻaha died before 1852 and left all his landholding to his son. On May 29, 1852, Kahanawai was placed under the guardianship of his brother-in-law William Luther Moehonua, the husband of his sister Lucy Muolo.

During his youth, he continued his family kuleana (responsibility) in serving the Hawaiian royal family. On October 15, 1853, Kahanawai was appointed as First Lieutenant of the Infantry in the Royal Hawaiian army by Prince Alexander Liholiho (the future Kamehameha IV) during reign of King Kamehameha III. Kahanawai also served as the chief steward and butler in the royal household under King Kamehameha IV and his wife Queen Emma from 1855 to 1863. After Kamehameha IV's death, he continued to serve the household of the Queen Dowager Emma during her widowhood.

On March 20, 1855, he married Virginia Kapoʻoloku Poʻomaikelani (1839–1895), a trusted lady-in-waiting and household attendant of Queen Emma. The couple did not have any children of their own but adopted and raised Edward Abnel Keliʻiahonui (1869–1887), the nephew of Poʻomaikelani.

Some time prior to 1873, Kahanawai and Poʻomaikelani left the service of Emma to join the factions loyal to Kalākaua. In the election of 1874 Kalākaua defeated Queen Dowager Emma to succeed Lunalilo as the monarch of Hawaii. Besides his own distant family ties to the new dynasty, Poʻomaikelani's elder sister was Queen Kapiolani, the wife and consort of the new king. After Kalākaua restored the Hawaiian army which had been disbanded by his predecessor, he appointed Kahanawai to the rank of Captain and in the capacity of Commander of the Household Troops.

== Death ==
Kahanawai, who had been in poor health for some time, died suddenly of a heart attack, on August 7, 1874, while in an audience with the King. His obituary reported his sudden death:

On Friday last (Aug. 7) Captain Hiram Kahanawai died very suddenly as it is supposed from aneurysm. He had just entered the King's presence, and bowed to His Majesty, when he dropped on the floor, and was carried out dead. He was a true and faithful servant, of a quiet and reserved disposition, and made a favorable impression upon all who knew him. His funeral was attended on Saturday afternoon from St. Andrew's Chapel, and his remains escorted to Nuuanu cemetery by the infantry troops and numerous personal friends, including members of the royal family. Among Hawaiians there are few who have left a more pleasant memory.

— "Sudden Death". The Hawaiian Gazette. Vol. X, no. 32. Honolulu. August 12, 1874. p. 3.

On September 17, 1873, Queen Emma had noted in a letter to her cousin Peter Kaʻeo that Kahanawai was suffering from "Anurism" and, although still resenting his betrayal, prayed for the recovery of her former servant for the sake of her dead husband and son. According to a later letter from Kaʻeo to Emma, he told her that both he and Jonatana Napela suspected that Kahanawai had been poisoned and the death had been covered up by the government. According to historian Alfons L. Korn, "No criminal charges were ever brought against anyone for being implicated in the death of Hiram Kahanawai."

He was buried at the Oʻahu Cemetery in Honolulu. His widow continued to be known as Mrs. Kapoʻoloku Kahanawai until she was created a Princess of the Kingdom by Letter Patent in 1883.

== Bibliography ==
- Cracroft, Sophia; Franklin, Jane; Queen Emma (1958). Korn, Alfons L. (ed.). The Victorian Visitors: An Account of the Hawaiian Kingdom, 1861–1866, Including the Journal Letters of Sophia Cracroft: Extracts from the Journals of Lady Franklin, and Diaries and Letters of Queen Emma of Hawaii. Honolulu: University of Hawaii Press. hdl:10125/39981. ISBN 978-0-87022-421-8. OCLC 8989368.
- Kaeo, Peter; Queen Emma (1976). Korn, Alfons L. (ed.). News from Molokai, Letters Between Peter Kaeo & Queen Emma, 1873–1876. Honolulu: The University Press of Hawaii. hdl:10125/39980. ISBN 978-0-8248-0399-5. OCLC 2225064.
- Kamae, Lori (1980). The Empty Throne. Honolulu: Topgallant Publishing Co. ISBN 978-0-914916-44-4. OCLC 7080687.
- Kamakau, Samuel (1992) [1961]. Ruling Chiefs of Hawaii (Revised ed.). Honolulu: Kamehameha Schools Press. ISBN 0-87336-014-1. OCLC 25008795.
- Kanahele, George S. (1999). Emma: Hawaii's Remarkable Queen. Honolulu: University of Hawaii Press. ISBN 978-0-8248-2240-8. OCLC 40890919.
