= David Kahalepouli Piʻikoi =

Father of Hawaiian royal princes

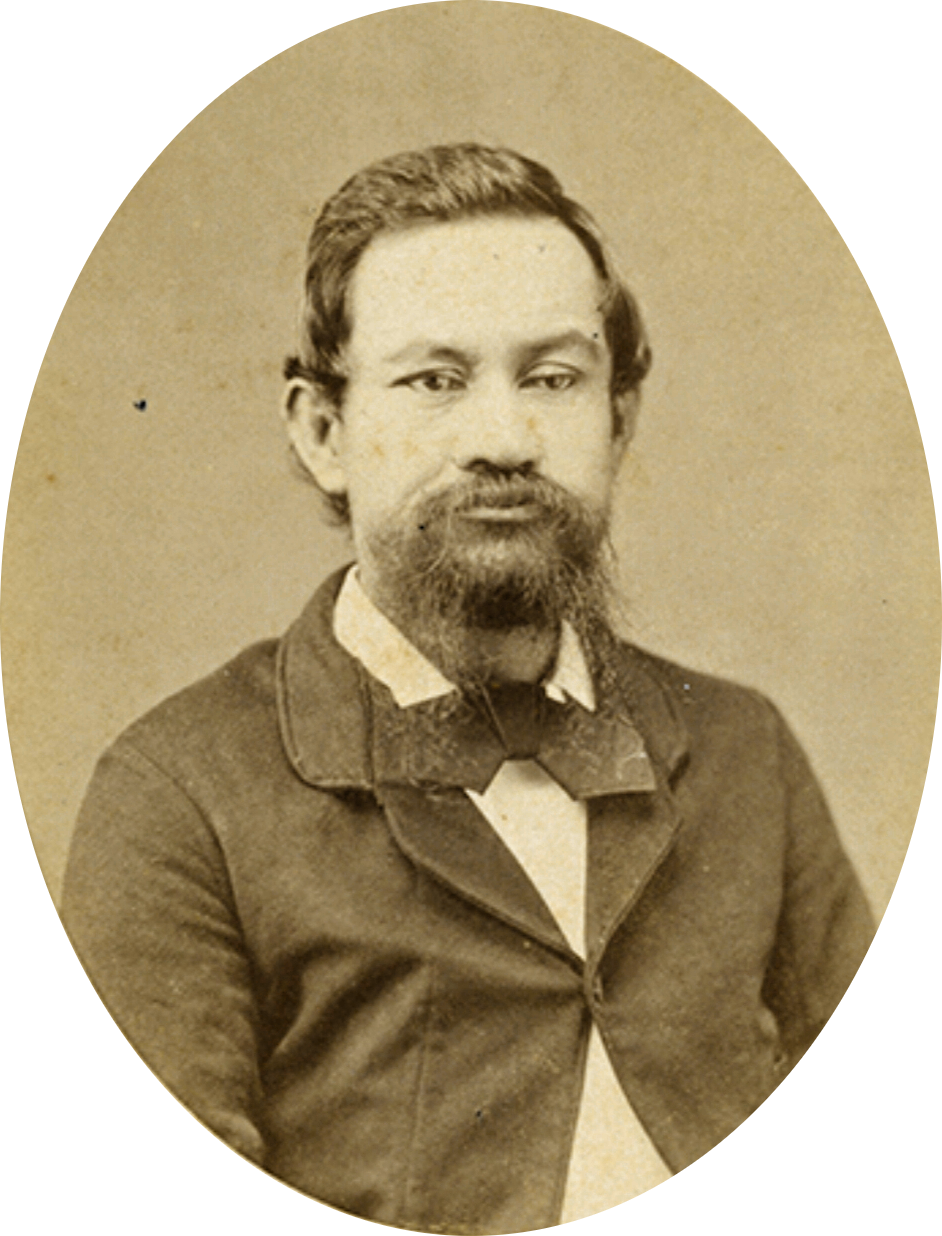
- Born: c. 1845
- Died: October 18, 1878 (aged 32–33); Kapaʻa, Kauaʻi
- Spouse: Victoria Kinoiki Kekaulike
- Children: David Kawānanakoa; Edward Abnel Keliʻiahonui; Jonah Kūhiō Kalanianaʻole
- Parent(s): Jonah Piʻikoi and Kekahili

David Kahalepouli Piʻikoi (c. 1845 – October 18, 1878) was father of three royal princes of the Kingdom of Hawaiʻi.

== Life ==
He was born in 1845. His father was High Chief Jonah Piʻikoi, descended from the ancient Kings of Kauaʻi. His mother was Kekahili, the daughter of High Chiefess Kamokuiki and High Chief Alapaʻimaloiki. Through his mother, he was the nephew of Kapaʻakea and first cousin of Kalākaua, Liliʻuokalani, Likelike and Leleiohoku II.

On February 25, 1861, he married Victoria Kinoiki Kekaulike, the sister of Queen Kapiʻolani the wife of his cousin Kalākaua. They had three sons: David Kawānanakoa, named after himself, Edward Abnel Keliʻiahonui, named after Prince Keliʻiahonui of Kauaʻi, and Jonah Kūhiō Kalanianaʻole, named after Piʻikoi's father and Kekaulike's father. His sons did not use the family surname of Piʻikoi, but each son used their own personal names as their surname. David's descendants would use the name Kawānanakoa, Edward's descendants would use Keliʻiahonui, and Jonah's would use Kalanianaʻole.

On October 24, 1865, Piʻikoi was convicted and sentenced for the crime of larceny in the second degree. However, he was later pardoned and had his civil rights restored by King Kalākaua in August 1874. Piʻikoi died on October 18, 1878, at Kapaʻa, Kauaʻi. His wife was granted the title of Princess and style of Her Royal Highness, in 1883 during King Kalākaua's coronation. His three sons were also granted title of Prince and style of His Highness. Piʻikoi Street in Honolulu is named after him or his father; the name translate as "lofty aspirations."

== Family tree ==
- Kawānanakoa family tree
