= Kūhiō Kalanianaʻole =

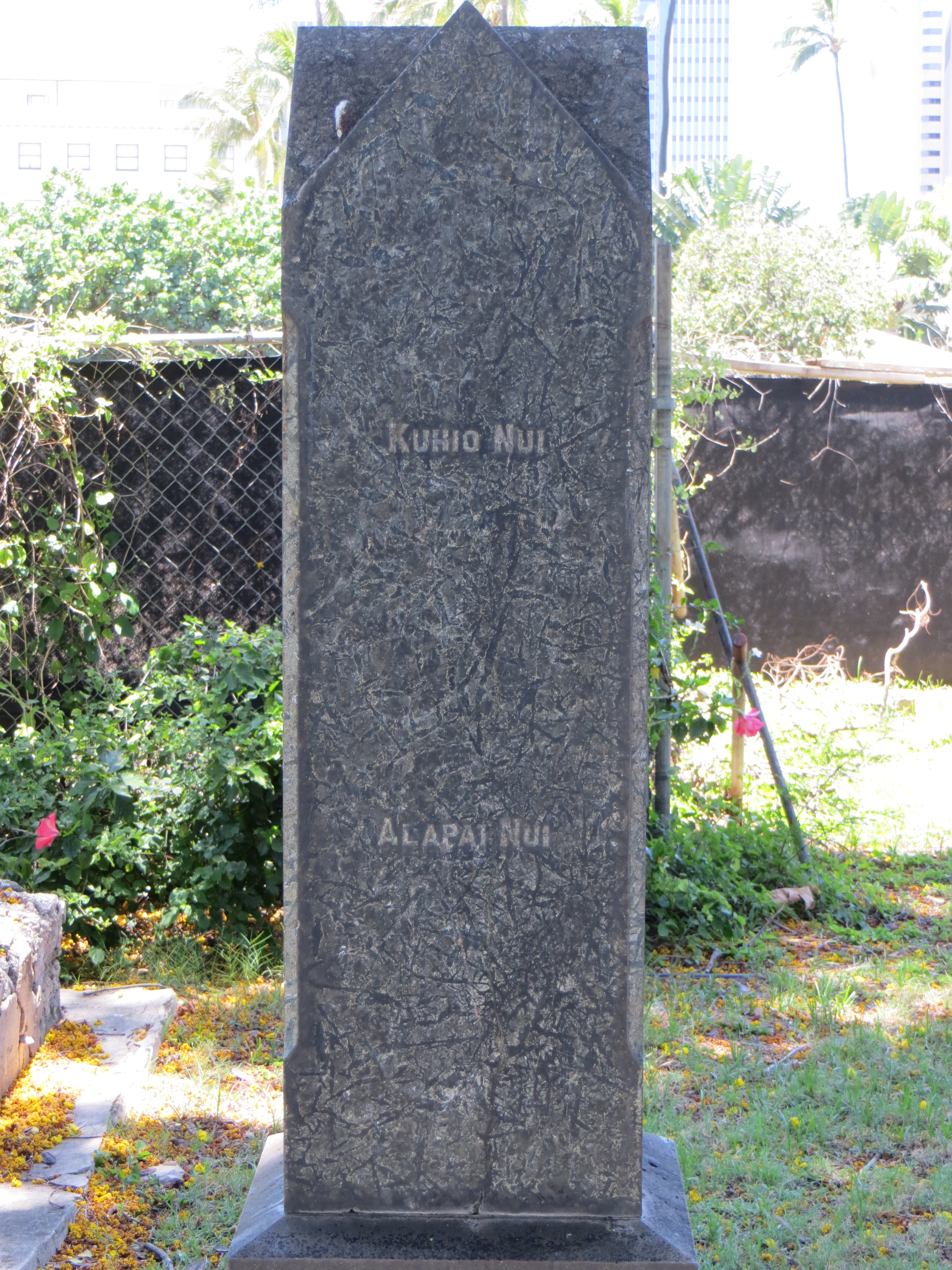
- Grave marker at the Kawaiahaʻo Cemetery
- Burial: Kawaiahaʻo Church
- Spouse: Kinoiki Kekaulike
- Issue: Kapiʻolani; Poʻomaikelani; Victoria Kinoiki Kekaulike
- Father: Elelule Laʻakeaelelulu
- Mother: Poʻomaikelani

Kūhiō Kalanianaʻole was a Hawaiian high chief of Hilo and father of Queen Kapiʻolani.

He was born to Aliʻi Elelule Laʻakeaelelulu and his wife Poʻomaikelani, daughter of Aliʻi Kanekoa, of Waimea, by his first wife, Kalani-kau-lelei-awi, daughter of Kepoʻomahoe. His father was the son of Keawemauhili, the brother of King Kalaniʻōpuʻu of Hawaii Island, and joint ruler of the District of Hilo with his wife Ululani. His father's mother Ululani was the most renowned poet of her day, and his father's sister was Kapiʻolani who defied the volcano goddess Pele. He is the great-great grandson of Kalaninuiamamao. He served as steward for his aunt Kapiʻolani and her husband Naihe and Kūhiō converted to Christianity alongside them. He married the Princess Kinoiki Kekaulike of Kauai, daughter of King Kaumualiʻi of Kauaʻi and Niʻihau. He and his wife had three daughters who were all members of the Royal Court of King Kalākaua in 1883. His daughters were Kapiʻolani, named after her aunt, Poʻomaikelani, named after Kūhiō's own mother, and Victoria Kinoiki Kekaulike, named after her mother. All of his daughters died issueless, except Victoria who gave birth to three sons: David Kawānanakoa, Edward Abnel Keliʻiahonui and Jonah Kūhiō Kalaniana'ole, his namesake.
