= James Washington Lonoikauoalii McGuire =

Royal courtier of the Hawaiian Kingdom

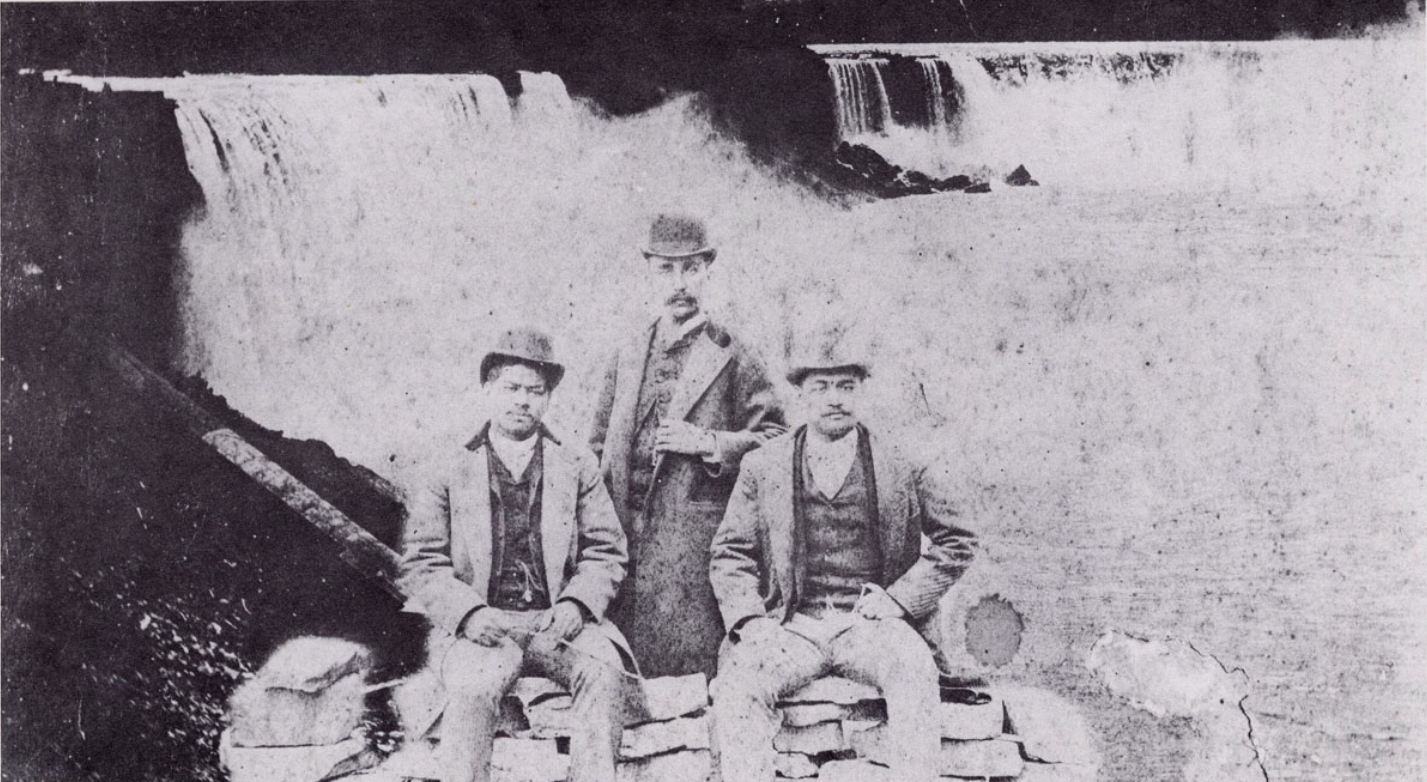
- McGuire at Niagara Falls with Prince Jonah Kūhiō Kalanianaʻole (left) and Prince David Kawānanakoa (right)
- Born: January 21, 1862; Kainaliu, Hawaii, Hawaiian Kingdom
- Died: May 16, 1941 (aged 79); Kaimuki, Honolulu, Territory of Hawaii
- Resting place: Oahu Cemetery
- Spouse: Fredericke Julia Nolte
- Children: 2

James Washington Lonoikauoalii McGuire (January 21, 1862 – May 16, 1941) was a royal courtier of the Hawaiian Kingdom. He served as a personal attendant and dressmaker to Queen Kapiʻolani, wife of King Kalākaua. McGuire fashioned the peacock feathered dress worn by Queen Kapiolani on the occasion of the Golden Jubilee of Queen Victoria in 1887. He kept a diary of his trip to the jubilee celebrations with the queen and published his account in 1938.

== Birth and family ==
McGuire was born, on January 21, 1862, at Kainaliu, Kona District, on the island Hawaii. McGuire was of Irish and Native Hawaiian descent. His mother was Mary Kilioe Vanbergen McGuire (1836–1917). His father James Washington McGuire (1831–1911), originally from Baltimore, Maryland, settled in Hawaii after joining the excitement of the California Gold Rush and later became fire marshal and charter member of the Honolulu Volunteer Fire Department.

== Royal service ==
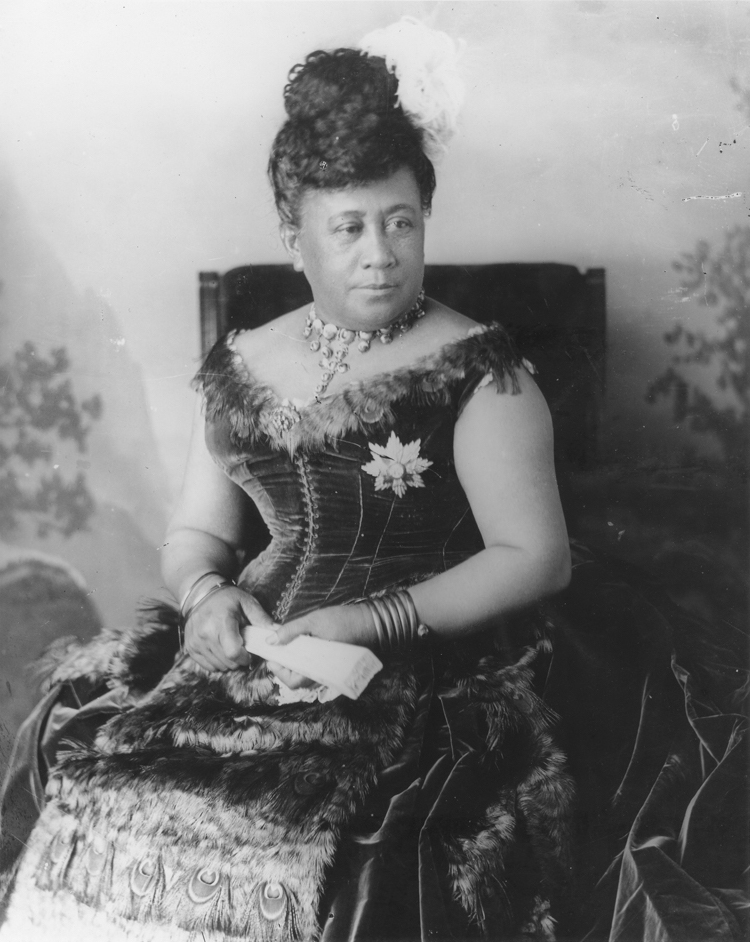
Queen Kapiʻolani wearing her peacock feathered gown at the Golden Jubilee of Queen Victoria, 1887

In April 1887, King Kalākaua sent a delegation to attend the Golden Jubilee of Queen Victoria in London. It included Queen Kapiʻolani, Princess Liliʻuokalani and Liliʻuokalani's husband John Owen Dominis, as well as Court Chamberlain Colonel Curtis P. Iʻaukea acting as official envoy of the king and Colonel James Harbottle Boyd acting as aide-de-camp to the Queen.

McGuire was one of the servants to accompany the royal party as a personal attendant and dressmaker for Queen Kapiʻolani, and held the honorary rank of Special Equerry to the Queen. He fashioned the peacock feathered dress worn by Queen Kapiʻolani on the occasion of the Jubilee, personally collecting the feathers used in the design.

The group landed in San Francisco and traveled across the United States before boarding a ship for the United Kingdom. In London, Kapiʻolani and Liliʻuokalani were granted an audience with Queen Victoria, attending the special Jubilee service at Westminster Abbey seated with other foreign royal guests and with members of the Royal Household.

In 1938, fifty-one years later, McGuire wrote his moʻolelo (story) of the Hawaiian delegation's journey to the Golden Jubilee from the diary he kept during his travel with the royal party. Written in the Hawaiian language, it was entitled He Moolelo Pokole o ka Huakai hele a ka Moiwahine Kapiolani i Enelani i ka Makahiki 1887 i ka lubile o ka Moiwahine Vitoria o Beretania Nui which translate as A Short Description of Queen Kapiolani's Voyage to England to Attend the Jubilee Celebration of Queen Victoria of England in the Year 1887.

In 1889, McGuire also accompanied Kapiʻolani's two nephews Prince Jonah Kūhiō Kalanianaʻole and Prince David Kawānanakoa on their journey abroad to the United States and Europe.

== Death ==
McGuire married Hilo-born Fredericke Julia Nolte (1871–1938), and they had two surviving daughters Lani Barringer and Louise Kaanapu.

McGuire worked in various position including as custodian of ʻIolani Palace, a restaurant owner and high bishop of the Church of Jesus Christ of Latter-day Saints in Hawaii. On May 16, 1941, he died at the age of 79 at his home in the Kaimuki neighborhood of Honolulu. In his estate, he left $3,375.54 in cash and a car worth $70. A lifelong collector of Hawaiiana artifacts, he amassed a large collection from his royal patrons. The acquisitions in his estate were valued at $7,532.80 (equivalent to $161,035 in 2024) and included seventy calabash bowls, traditional fishing implements, kapa cloth, drums, and kāhili. His funeral was held from the Church of Jesus Christ of Latter-day Saints in Kalihi. He was buried at Oahu Cemetery.

== Bibliography ==
- Gonschor, Lorenz (2019). A Power in the World: The Hawaiian Kingdom in Oceania. Honolulu: University of Hawaii Press. ISBN 978-0-8248-8001-9. OCLC 1056198239.
- Iaukea, Sydney Lehua (2012). The Queen and I: A Story of Dispossessions and Reconnections in Hawaiʻi. Berkeley: University of California Press. ISBN 978-0-520-95030-6. OCLC 763161035.
- Jenkins, Irving; Kauai Museum; Bernice Pauahi Bishop Museum. Department of Anthropology; Honolulu Academy of Arts (1989). The Hawaiian calabash. Honolulu: Editions Ltd. ISBN 978-0-915013-09-8. OCLC 18982908.
- Kuykendall, Ralph Simpson (1967). The Hawaiian Kingdom 1874–1893, The Kalakaua Dynasty. Vol. 3. Honolulu: University of Hawaii Press. ISBN 978-0-87022-433-1. OCLC 500374815.
- Liliuokalani (1898). Hawaii's Story by Hawaii's Queen, Liliuokalani. Boston: Lee and Shepard. ISBN 978-0-548-22265-2. OCLC 2387226.
- Schweizer, Niklaus Rudolf (2004). His Hawaiian Excellency: The Overthrow of the Hawaiian Monarchy and the Annexation of Hawai'i (3rd ed.). New York: Peter Lang. ISBN 978-0-8204-6871-6. OCLC 55682174.
- Schweizer, Niklaus Rudolf (1999). Turning Tide: The Ebb and Flow of Hawaiian Nationality. Berne, NY: Peter Lang. ISBN 978-3-906762-00-5. OCLC 41445703.
- Siler, Julia Flynn (2012). Lost Kingdom: Hawaii's Last Queen, the Sugar Kings and America's First Imperial Adventure. New York: Atlantic Monthly Press. ISBN 978-0-8021-9488-6. OCLC 881683650.
- Warinner, Emily V.; McFarland, Margaret Bukeley (1975). A Royal Journey to London (PDF). Honolulu: Topgallant Publishing Company. ISBN 978-0-914916-11-6. OCLC 4573808.

=== Newspapers and online sources ===
- Billam-Walker, Donald (September 17, 1938). "Hawaiians Abroad! The 1887 Royal Tour". Honolulu Star-Bulletin. Honolulu. p. 47.
- Blackman, L. G (December 23, 1939). "Shadows of Old Hawaii". Honolulu Star-Bulletin. Honolulu. pp. 31–32.
- Higgins, Colette (April 19, 2016). "Then & Now". In the Footsteps of Kapiʻolani – Retracing Queen Kapiʻolani's Journey to London in 1887.
- "Mrs. F. N. McGuire Dies After Illness". Honolulu Star-Bulletin. Honolulu. May 17, 1941. p. 2.
- "Mrs. McGuire, 67, Dies in Kaimuki". The Honolulu Advertiser. Honolulu. January 7, 1938. p. 5.
- "Interesting Career Is Ended By Death". The Honolulu Advertiser. Honolulu. June 25, 1911. p. 10.
- "Mrs. Mary M'Guire Dies In Son's Home". The Pacific Commercial Advertiser. Honolulu. July 2, 1911. p. 7.
- "James McGuire, Friend of Kings, Dies Here at 79". Honolulu Star-Bulletin. Honolulu. May 16, 1941. p. 3.
- "Isle Kings' Friend Dies". The Honolulu Advertiser. Honolulu. May 17, 1941. p. 3.
- "McGuire Services To Be Held Sunday". Honolulu Star-Bulletin. Honolulu. May 17, 1941. p. 1.
- "DIED – McGuire". The Honolulu Advertiser. Honolulu. May 17, 1941. p. 12.
- "DIED – McGuire". Honolulu Star-Bulletin. Honolulu. May 17, 1941. p. 18.
- "Hawaiian Articles In McGuire Estate Valued at $7,532". Honolulu Star-Bulletin. Honolulu. October 2, 1941. p. 12.
- Taylor, Emma Ahuena (March 16, 1935). "Iolani Palace Entertainments Of Old Days Were Glittering Affairs, Long Remembered". Honolulu Star-Bulletin. Honolulu. p. 9.
