= Poʻomaikelani =

Princess of Hawaiʻi (1839–1895)

- Princess of Hawaii
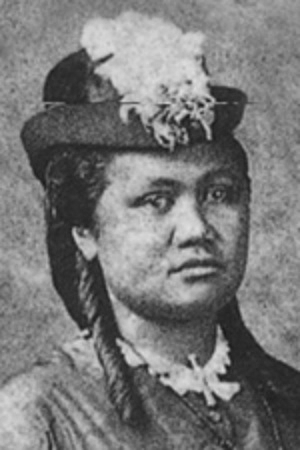
- Born: April 7, 1839; Hilo, Hawaiʻi
- Died: October 2, 1895 (aged 56); Kalihi Valley, Oʻahu
- Burial: October 3, 1895; Mauna Ala Royal Mausoleum
- Spouse: Hiram Kahanawai
Names
- Virginia Kapoʻoloku Poʻomaikelani
- House: House of Kalakaua
- Father: Kūhiō Kalanianaʻole
- Mother: Kinoiki Kekaulike

Virginia Kapoʻoloku Poʻomaikelani (1839–1895) was a member of the royal family of the Kingdom of Hawaii.

== Life ==
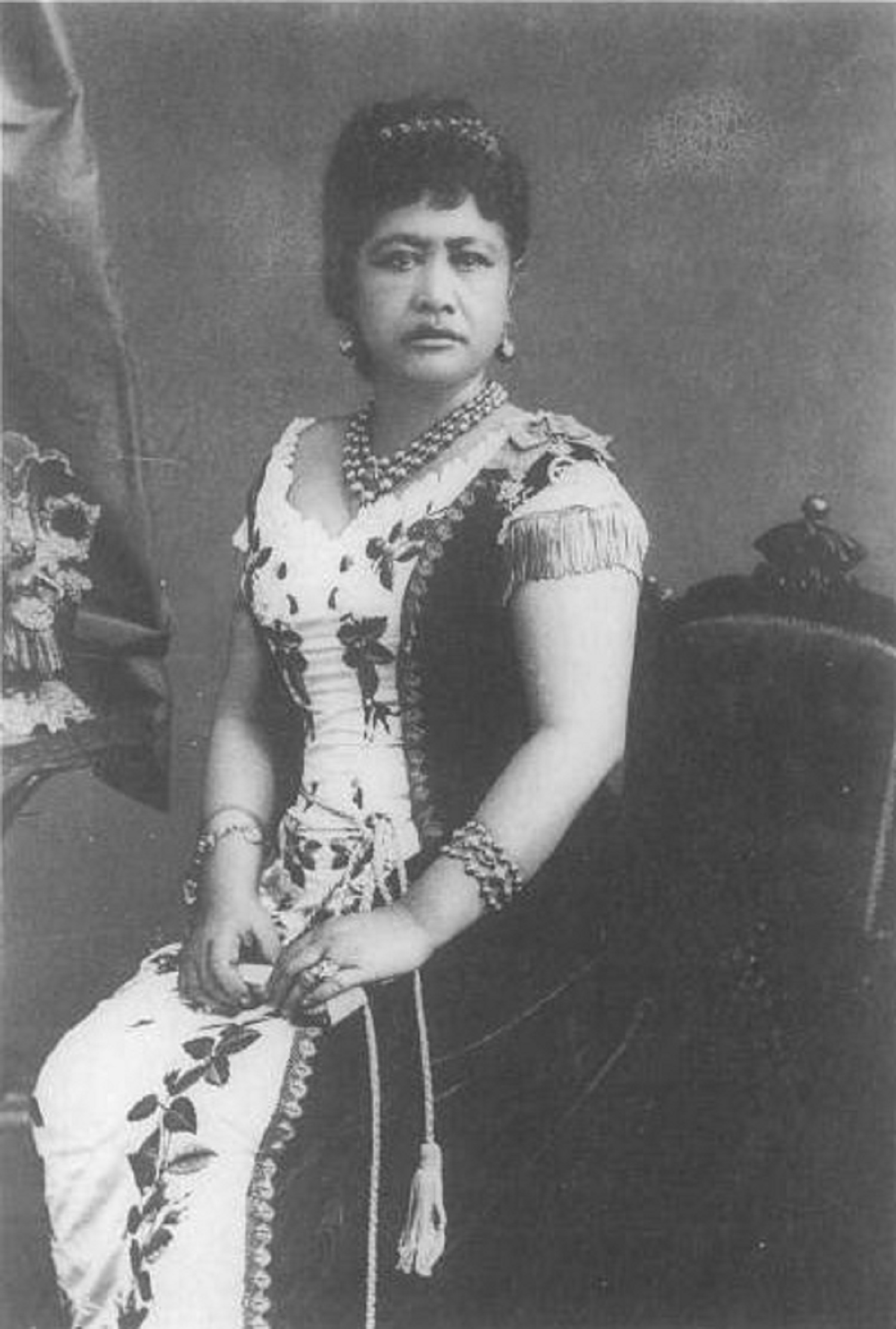
Princess Poʻomaikelani.

She was born at Piʻihonua, Hilo, Hawaiʻi Island on April 7, 1839, the second daughter of Princess Kinoiki Kekaulike of Kauaʻi and High Chief Kūhiō Kalanianaʻole of Hilo. She was the granddaughter of Kaumualiʻi, the last king of the island of Kauaʻi before being ceded to the unified Hawaiian Islands governed by Kamehameha I. She was also the stepdaughter of Queen Regent Kaʻahumanu.

She was elder sister of Victoria Kinoiki Kekaulike and younger sister of Queen Kapiʻolani, who married to King Kalākaua. Some sources give her different first names; for example Esther, Abigail or even Victoria. The situation was that the three sisters rarely used their Christian names.

On March 20, 1855, she married Hiram Kahanawai, a steward of Queen Emma. Poʻomaikelani and her husband served as in the household as retainers of Queen Emma. She was one of the trusted ladies-in-waiting for many years, but left Emma's employment to join her brother-in-law's court. The couple did not have any children of their own but adopted and raised her nephew Prince Edward Abnel Keliʻiahonui, the second son of her sister Kekaulike.

Her sister's husband became the king of Hawaiʻi in 1874 and she was granted the title of Princess and style of Her Royal Highness, in 1883 during Kalākaua's coronation. She was made Governor of Hawaiʻi island in 1884 by her brother-in-law and was paid an annual salary of 3500 dollars per year. She also served as President of the Board of Health in 1887.

She was Guardian of the Royal Tombs at the Royal Mausoleum of Hawaii from October 15, 1888 until 1893. Kalākaua appointed her as president of the Board of Genealogy of Hawaiian Chiefs. Poʻomaikelani was kahili bearer during Kalākaua's official coronation.

== Death ==
Suffering from paralysis in her right leg, Poʻomaikelani had been largely incapacitated for the last ten years of her life having to be carried about, especially to service at St. Andrew's Cathedral where she regularly attended. Her condition worsened over the years until she was unable to leave her house. She died at Kalihi Valley, Oahu, October 2, 1895, aged 56, two years after Queen Liliʻuokalani was overthrown. The cause of death was heart failure. After a funeral service at St. Andrew's, she was interred in the Royal Mausoleum of Hawaii. In 1910, after the completion of the separate Kalākaua Crypt, her casket was moved there from the main mausoleum building along with other members of the Kalākaua Dynasty.

== Ancestry ==
Ancestors of Poʻomaikelani

16. Kalaninuiamamao
8. Keawemauhili
17. Kekaulike-i-Kawekiuonalani (=23)
4. Elelule Laʻakeaelelulu
18. Mokulani
9. ʻUlulani
19. Papaikaniau
2. Kūhiō Kalanianaʻole
20. Keʻeaumoku Nui
10. Kanekoa
21. Kailakanoa
5. Poʻomaikelani
22. Kepoʻomahoe
11. Kalanikauleleiawi-a-Kepoomahoe
23. Kekaulike-i-Kawekiuonalani (=17)
1. Poʻomaikelani
24. Kekaulike
12. Kāʻeokūlani
25. Haʻaloʻu
6. Kaumualiʻi
26. Kaumeheiwa
13. Kamakahelei
27. Kaʻapuwai
3. Kinoiki Kekaulike
14. Palikua?
7. Kaʻapuwai Kapuaʻamohu
30. Kaneoneo
15. Kawalu?
31. Kamakahelei

== See also ==
- Hale Nauā Society

Government offices
Preceded by Princess Victoria Kekaulike	Governor of Hawaiʻi Island; 1884–1886	Succeeded by Ululani Baker
