= Kinoiki Kekaulike =

- Born: after 1800?
- Spouse: Kūhiō Kalanianaʻole
- Issue: Kapiʻolani; Poʻomaikelani; Victoria Kinoiki Kekaulike
- Father: Kaumualiʻi
- Mother: Kaʻapuwai Kapuaʻamohu

Kinoiki Kekaulike I was a Princess of the island of Kauaʻi during the transition from ancient Hawaii to the Kingdom of Hawaii.

== Biography ==
She was born in the early 19th century. Her father was King Kaumualiʻi (1778–1824), descended from the royal family of Kauaʻi through his mother, Queen Kamakahelei and the royal family of Maui through his father Kaeokulani. Her mother was Kaʻapuwai Kapuaʻamohu, her father's stepdaughter and niece, daughter of Queen Kawalu, another wife of Kaumualiʻi being his half-sister, by her first husband, Chief Palikua of Koloa. Her mother was also granddaughter of Kamakahelei and Kaneoneo, the exiled king of Oʻahu who had been overthrown by the chiefs of Oʻahu and replaced by ʻEwa chief Kahahana. Her brother was Prince Kealiiahonui, a member of the 15 seat counsel of King Kamehameha III's House of Nobles and last prince of Kauaʻi.

She married the Ali'i Nui of Hilo, Kūhiō Kalanianaʻole, son of Chief Elelule, by his wife, Chiefess Poʻomaikelani, daughter of Chief Kanekoa of Waimea. She was related to three of the four main island royal families: Maui, Kauai, and Oahu. Kūhiō Kalanianaʻole was the great-great grandson of King Keaweʻīkekahialiʻiokamoku of the island of Hawaiʻi.

With Kūhiō she had three daughters who were all members of the Royal Court of King Kalākaua in 1883. Their daughters were: Kapiʻolani (1834–1899), the eldest, named after Kūhiō's aunt Kapiʻolani; Poʻomaikelani, named after Kūhiō's mother; Victoria Kinoiki Kekaulike, named after Princess Kinoiki Kekaulike. Only Victoria had children; she gave birth to three sons: David Kawānanakoa, Edward Abnel Keliʻiahonui and Jonah Kūhiō Kalanianaʻole; her grandson, David Kawānanakoa has surviving descendants.
