= Deborah Kapule =

Last queen of Kauaʻi prior to its modern establishment

Deborah Kapule Kekaihaʻakūlou
- Born: c. 1798; Waimea, Kauai
- Died: August 26, 1853 (aged 55); Waimea, Kauai
- Spouse: Kaumualiʻi; Kamaholelani; Kamehameha II; Kealiʻiahonui; Simeon Kaʻiu
- Issue: Josiah Kaumualiʻi
- Father: Hāʻupu or Kaiʻawa
- Mother: Hāwea

Deborah Kapule Kekaihaʻakūlou (c. 1798–1853) was the last Queen of Kauaʻi (as wife to Kaumualiʻi) before the establishment of the Kingdom of Hawaiʻi by King Kamehameha I.

== Life ==
She was born around 1798; the location of her birth is not known for certain but, since she lived around Waimea and since she received property there from her father in later life, it is assumed that this was her birthplace. Her genealogy is not well documented. According to one source, her father was a High Chief Hāʻupu of Waimea, who was one of the chiefs whom King Kaumualiʻi sent to Oahu in 1810.

But according to Hawaiian historian Samuel Kamakau, her (or at least Kekaihaʻakūlou's) parents were Kaiʻawa and Hāwea. Kaiʻawa was a counselor to Kaumualiʻi's father Kāʻeokūlani and was connected to Kāneikaheilani, a chiefess from Kaua'i who was the grandmother of Haʻalou, the maternal grandmother of Queen Kaʻahumanu, and also to Kaweloamaihunāliʻi, an early King of Kauaʻi. Hāwea was a relative of Queen Kaʻahumanu from a Maui line of descent.

During her early life, she was called Haʻakūlou, which was short for Kekaihaʻakūlou, or Kapule; she was also called Tepoora or Tapoola, early Western renditions of her name. Deborah Kapule is often identified with Kepola, a name that was given to the last Queen of Kauaʻi.

One source claims that Kekaihaʻakūlou and Kapule were distinct individuals who were both wives of Kaumuali'i. This would mean that the woman that accompanied him to the island of Oahu in 1810 to surrender to King Kamehameha I and was later given to King Liholiho Kamehameha II as his sixth wife was not Kapule.

Her first husband was a chief on Kauaʻi. Her second husband was King Kaumualiʻi (married around 1817) and, after which, she was proclaimed Queen of Kauaʻi. Her home was near Pā‘ula‘ula, literally “red enclosure,” formerly called the Russian Fort Elizabeth. Kaʻahumanu married Kaumualiʻi to dissolve any claims to power. Deborah Kapule then married Abner Keliʻiahonui, who was Kaumualiʻi’s son by Kaʻapuwai Kapuaʻamohu. But Kaʻahumanu married Keliʻiahonui. In spite of the fact that the monarchy had taken her two husbands (metaphorically speaking, Kaʻahumanu was the Head of State at the time), Deborah remained faithful to the Kingdom of Hawaiʻi. When Humehume’s (another of Kaumualiʻi’s sons) men arrived at the Russian Fort to try and reinstate the Kingdom of Kauaʻi, Deborah fought against them.

Deborah then married Simeon Kaʻiu. Her husband was a devout Christian, and she converted in 1825. They produced her only child, a son they name Josiah Kaumualiʻi, names they both respected. She later was excommunicated from the church for having an affair with a married man, Oliver Chapin. She was later reinstated in the 1840s. In 1835, Deborah and Simeon moved to Wailua with 16 others and founded a new church, though Simeon died shortly after on September 11, 1835.

Around 1836, Governor Kaikioʻewa of Kauaʻi became jealous of her popularity, and she was arrested and taken to Oʻahu. It was not until 1838, when Kamehameha III granted an appeal, that Deborah was returned to Kauaʻi by Reverend William Richards.

In the latter part of her life, Deborah Kapule lived in Waimea, where she assisted in the construction of the Waimea Stone Church and helped convert the Malae heiau into a cattle corral.

Deborah Kapule died in Waimea on August 26, 1853; the location of her burial place is unknown.

== Bibliography ==
- Ii, John Papa; Pukui, Mary Kawena; Barrère, Dorothy B. (1983). Fragments of Hawaiian History (2 ed.). Honolulu: Bishop Museum Press. ISBN 978-0-910240-31-4.
- Joesting, Edward (1988). Kauai: The Separate Kingdom. University of Hawaii Press. ISBN 0-8248-1162-3.
- Kamakau, Samuel (1992) [1961]. Ruling Chiefs of Hawaii (Revised ed.). Honolulu: Kamehameha Schools Press. ISBN 0-87336-014-1.
- Mills, Peter R. (2002). Hawaiʻi's Russian Adventure: A New Look at Old History. University of Hawaii Press. ISBN 0-8248-2404-0.
