= Kewalo Basin =

Harbor in Hawaii, United States

Coordinates: 21°17.564′N 157°51.462′W

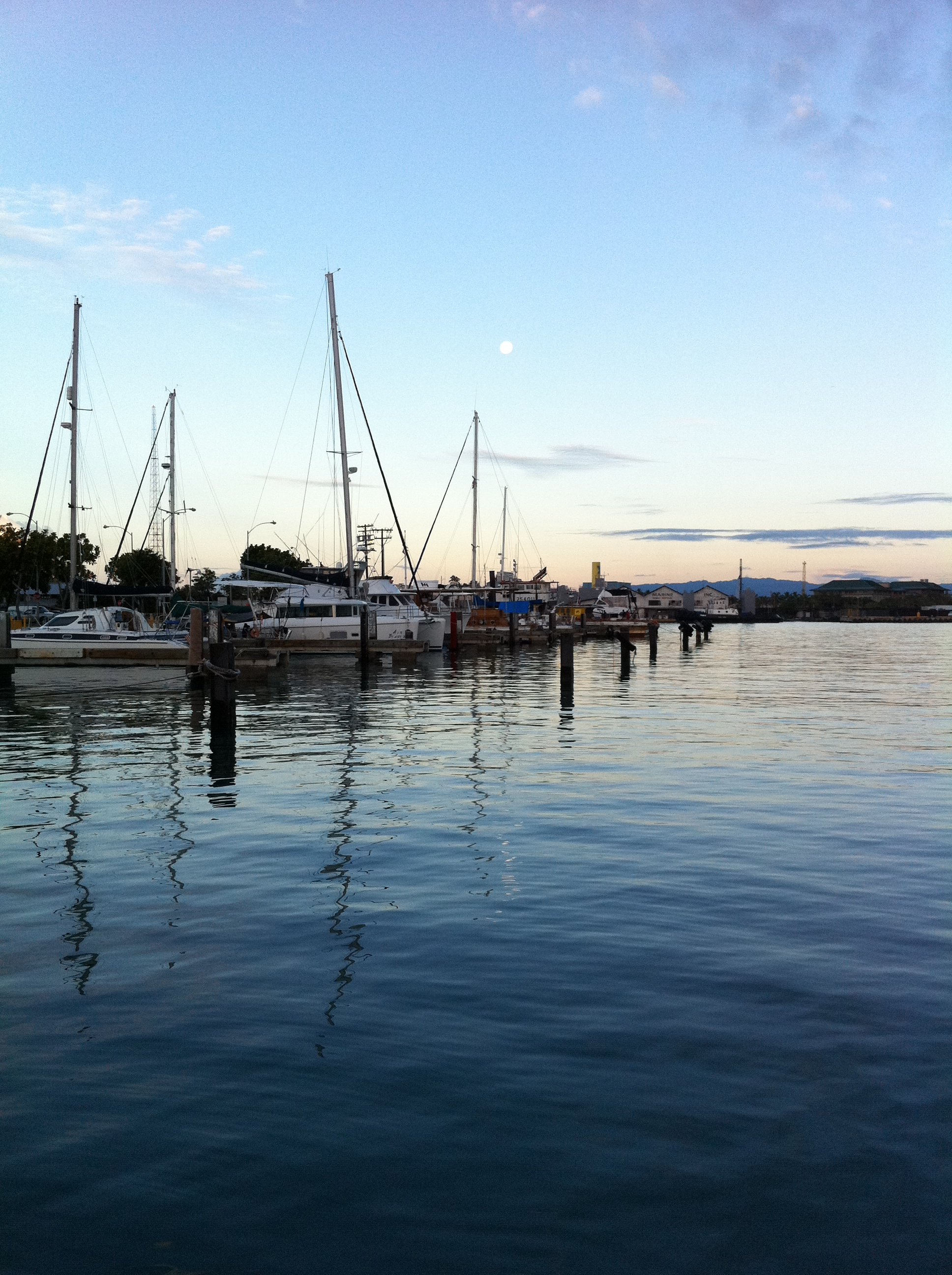
Kewalo Basin

Kewalo Basin is a commercial boat harbor that serves as home to some of Honolulu's commercial fishing fleet, and charter and excursion vessels that serve the Hawaii tourist market. Pre-European contact, the area was historically used for human sacrifice. The land was given to Ihu by Kamehameha I and inherited by his daughter Kamakeʻe and her husband Jonah Piikoi. On the ocean side of the harbor is a small beach park on the Honolulu waterfront, located adjacent to the larger Ala Moana Beach Park. This park is good for swimming, picnicking and sightseeing. It can be accessed from the corners of Ala Moana Boulevard and Ward Avenue.

== See also ==
- Official Website
- List of Hawaiian state parks
- yacht charters from Kewalo Basin
- Hawaii State History of Harbors
- Port Hawaii - A Guide to Port Hawaii
- Choy Designs - CSK History - Rudy Choy was instrumental in starting the Dinner Cruise business for tourist at Kewalo Basin in Honolulu, Hawaii. He designed, built and operated many of the excursion catamarans that operate from Kewalo Basin.
- See an historic catamaran designed by Rudy Choy, the founder of CSK Catamarans. Woodbridge "Woody" Brown, Alfred Kumalae and Rudy Choy are considered the godfathers of modern oceangoing catamaran design.
