= Saint Matthew's Episcopal Day School =

Private school in California, United States

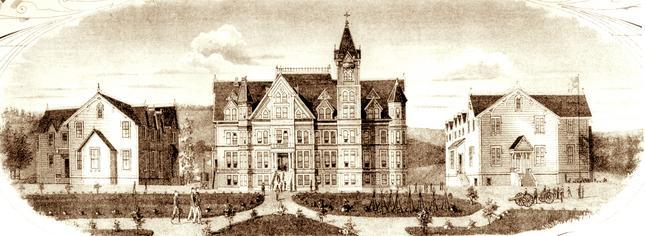
19th century campus on Barroilhet Avenue

Episcopal Day School of St. Matthew is a private co-educational day school located in San Mateo, California. Until 2021, the school was known as St. Matthew's Episcopal Day school, but the name was changed to Episcopal Day School.It was founded in 1865, by Andrew Lee Brewer, and was previously a military school known as Saint Matthew's Hall or Saint Matthew's School.

== Background ==
The school offers classes from Pre-Kindergarten to 8th grade. The school's pre-school program was terminated in 2019 after more than 50 years of continuous operation. The school is on a small campus, a building completed in 1957, that was expanded in a major construction project that began in 2013 and was completed in 2015 and is shared with St. Matthew's Episcopal Church. The Pre-K and Kindergarten classes are in a separate building a block away. Lay teachers have been used since 1970. The tuition is around $30,000 per year. The main campus is located at 16 Baldwin Avenue, San Mateo, California.

== Enrollment ==
The school had K-8 enrollment of 269 students in the 2019 school year compared to 271 in the prior year. Maximum enrollment capacity is approximately 324 students. The day school has facilities for two classes per grade.

== School history ==
=== Founding as a Military School ===
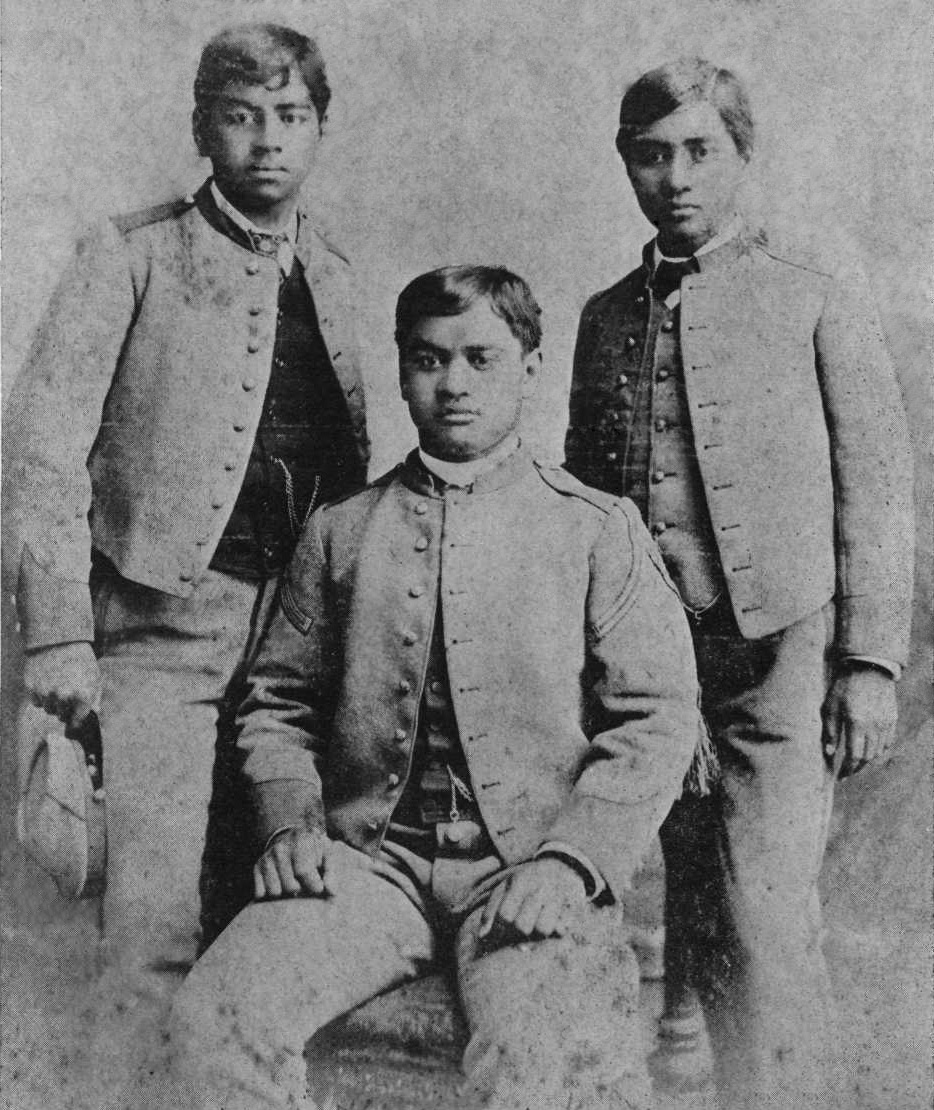
Hawaiian princes David Kawānanakoa, Edward Abnel Keliʻiahonui and Jonah Kūhiō Kalaniana'ole in their cadet uniforms.

The day school was founded in 1865 and was previously a military boarding school for boys known as Saint Matthew's Hall or Saint Matthew's School, established as an "English and Classical School for Boys". Military discipline was rigorously maintained - students were required to wear military style uniforms, marched between locations at the school and were awakened by bugle. Starting in 1872, military instructors of military academies were required to be commissioned Majors in the National Guard, ensuring that military schools maintained adequate discipline. In the early years of the military school, students, called cadets, were equipped with rifles and a cannon (a Parrott field gun) and conducted military field training. Approximately 3,000 young men graduated from Saint Matthew's Hall before its closure. The military school was prestigious, and graduation guaranteed acceptance to the University of California at Berkeley and Stanford. It was so successful that several similar military-style schools opened in the surrounding area. In the early 1890s, Brewer decided that the military school required more room and moved to Hillsborough, where it remained until it closure in 1915.

David Kawānanakoa, a nephew of Hawaiian King David Kalākaua, attended the academy from 1884 to 1887. While studying there Kawānanakoa, and his younger brothers, Edward Abnel Keliʻiahonui and Jonah Kūhiō Kalanianaʻole, are credited with introducing surfing to the United States.

=== St. Margaret's School for Girls ===
After the military school moved to Hillsborough, the Reverend George Wallace reopened the buildings at the day school's current location on Baldwin Avenue as St. Margaret's School for girls, which continued operation until 1892.

=== Establishment of Current Day School ===
The current form of day school was founded in 1953 by the Sisters of the Community of the Transfiguration, an order of Episcopal nuns from Ohio under rector Lesley Wilder Jr. The day school initially included nursery and pre-nursery classes before adding additional classes to become a nursery through 8th grade school in 1963. The day school completed a $21 million building project in 2015 that increased its building space by 27,000 square feet, adding classroom space and allowing it to double its classes from one class per grade level to two. Although the school exists within the Episcopal Church, students are not required to ascribe to any religion, and only about 15% are Episcopalian. Sexual abuse crisis

=== Notable alumni ===
- Jonah Kuhio Kalaniana'ole - fifth in the line of in succession to the Hawaiian throne
- David Kawananakoa - third in the line of in succession to the Hawaiian throne
- Edward Keliiahonui - fourth in the line of in succession to the Hawaiian throne
- John F. Madden, U.S. Army brigadier general
- Lincoln Steffens - later a celebrated writer, who was frequently disciplined by Brewer

== Sexual Abuse Case ==
=== Background ===
In 2017, the day school experienced a child sexual abuse crisis when one of its pre-school teachers, Anthony Rocco Satriano, created hundreds of pornographic images and videos of day school students. The teacher targeted as many as 20 five to eight year old students. The illegal pictures and videos were taken during school hours in the pre-school and in the school's after-care program. The teacher acknowledged using the pictures for sexual gratification as part of a bondage fetish. The teacher pled guilty (no contest) to 5 felony charges and was sentenced to 6 years in prison. The case resulted in a number of claims and lawsuits filed against the day school, Head of School Julie Galles and St. Matthew's Episcopal Church and resulted in a great deal of negative publicity for the school.

The California Department of Social Services also found that the day school committed licensing violations as a result of the incidents.

=== Efforts to remove judge ===
In addition to the very large number of children targeted, the case was notable because of the San Mateo District Attorney's efforts to remove the judge, Judge Donald Ayoob, from the case (as well as two other cases being heard by Judge Ayoob), because of perceptions that the judge was too lenient on sex abuse perpetrators and would not take the case seriously. Judge Ayoob had sentenced prior perpetrators to a year in county jail rather than state prison as requested by prosecutors including a perpetrator who possessed thousands of pornographic images and videos. Prosecutors did not file paperwork requesting the removal in time, and another judge refused to remove Ayoob. After the case of Brock Turner, who received a 6 month sentence for raping a Stanford University Student, generating such public outcry over the leniency of the sentence that the judge in the case was recalled and removed as a judge, the prosecutors' effort to remove the judge reflected prosecutors' determination to ensure that sexual abuse cases are taken seriously, but raised questions of whether prosecutors were trying to politicize cases or influence the outcome by generating a "mob mentality". Although the judge was not removed, the sentence of six years was significantly more severe than Judge Ayoob had given to other perpetrators, and the general perception was that the effort to have these cases taken seriously was, at least in this case, effective.

== St. Matthew's Episcopal Church ==
The Episcopal Church of St. Matthew operates the day school. The church is part of the Diocese of California, located in San Francisco.

On April 24, 1864, Giles Alexander Easton established an Episcopal church named for Saint Matthew on the historic mission trail known as El Camino Real. Services were held in a school until ground could be broken for a building. Two acres of land were donated by Agnes Poett Howard, widow of William Davis Merry Howard, and their son, William Henry Howard. In 1865 a stone church with capacity of about 200 people was built and a two-story school building known as Saint Mathew's Hall for the school. The nave was 48 feet (15 m) by 36 feet (11 m), and the chancel was 12 feet (3.7 m) by 24 feet (7.3 m). The street between the church and school was known as Saint Matthews Avenue. Alfred Lee Brewer (1831–1899) operated the school in English "public school" tradition with strict military discipline. The school campus became part of the city of Burlingame, California.

Three Princes of the Kingdom of Hawaii, brothers Jonah Kūhiō Kalanianaʻole (1871–1922), David Kawānanakoa (1868–1908) and Edward Abnel Keliʻiahonui (1869–1887) attended the school in the 1880s. It advertised itself as "the leading private educational institution for boys on the Pacific Coast" in 1889. It was later taken over by his son William Augustus Brewer (1863–1931). William Brewer became mayor of the new town of Hillsborough, California. By 1902 the school was called "the best known private educational institution upon the west coast."

Neptune Blood William Gallway became rector of the church in 1904. The buildings were damaged in the 1906 San Francisco earthquake. The old church was replaced by a new one designed by Willis Polk, with many furnishings salvaged from the original building. The new building was consecrated on May 15, 1910. The school was shut down in 1915 when a road was constructed through the campus. A new organ was donated in memory of William H. Crocker in 1938.

== See also ==
- William Verbeck
