= Kapiʻolani =

Queen consort of Hawaiʻi (1834–1899)

- Official portrait by Menzies Dickson, 1879

Queen consort of the Hawaiian Islands
- Tenure: February 12, 1874 – January 20, 1891
- Coronation: February 12, 1883, ʻIolani Palace
- Born: December 31, 1834; Hilo, Hawaiian Kingdom
- Died: June 24, 1899 (aged 64); Waikīkī, Territory of Hawaii
- Burial: July 2, 1899; Mauna ʻAla Royal Mausoleum
- Spouse: Bennett Nāmākēhā; Kalākaua
Names
- Kapiʻolani Napelakapuokakaʻe
- House: House of Kalākaua
- Father: Kūhiō Kalanianaʻole
- Mother: Kinoiki Kekaulike
- Religion: Church of Hawaii

Kapiʻolani (Note: Hawaiian pronunciation: [kəˌpiʔoˈlɐni].) (December 31, 1834 – June 24, 1899) was the queen of the Kingdom of Hawaiʻi as the consort of Mōʻī (king) Kalākaua, who reigned from 1874 until his death in 1891, when she became known as the Dowager Queen Kapiʻolani. Deeply interested in the health and welfare of Native Hawaiians, Kapiʻolani established the Kapiʻolani Home for Girls, for the education of the daughters of residents of the Kalaupapa Leprosy Settlement, and the Kapiʻolani Maternity Home, where Hawaiian mothers and newborns could receive care.

== Early life and family ==
Kapiʻolani was born December 31, 1834, in Hilo on Hawaiʻi Island to High Chief Kūhiō Kalanianaʻole of Hilo and High Chiefess Kinoiki Kekaulike of Kauaʻi, the daughter of King Kaumualiʻi, the last king of an independent Kauaʻi before its cession to Kamehameha the Great. Her two younger sisters were Kapoʻoloku Poʻomaikelani (1839–1895), who married Hiram Kahanawai, and Kinoiki Kekaulike (1843–1884), who married David Kahalepouli Piʻikoi.

Her full name was Kapiʻolani Napelakapuokakaʻe. (Note: Some later sources call her Julia Kapiʻolani (Bailey 1975, p. 267; Kamae 1980, p. 39; Allen 1995, p. 33; Kanahele 1999, p. 130)) Her namesake was her great-aunt High Chiefess Kapiʻolani, who plucked the ʻōhelo berries and openly defied the goddess Pele as a dramatic demonstration of her new faith in Christianity. Kapiʻolani is composed of three words (ka piʻo lani) and literally means "the arch [of] heaven (rainbows signified the presence of royalty)". Her secondary name, Napelakapuokakaʻe, translates to "the sacred flesh of Kakae".

She was raised in Hilo until the age of eight when she was sent to be raised in the district of Kona, on the western side of the island of Hawaiʻi. She went to Honolulu on Oʻahu when she was sixteen and came under the guardianship of King Kamehameha III.

Kapiʻolani was brought up to read and write in the Hawaiian language. Although she learned to understand a few English words and phrases, like many Native Hawaiians she never learned to speak it fluently and required a Hawaiian translator when communicating with English speakers. Kapiʻolani became a member of the Anglican Church of Hawaiʻi after it was established in 1862.

== Marriage to Nāmākēhā ==
On March 7, 1852, Kapiʻolani married High Chief Bennett Nāmākēhā, a member of the House of Nobles, in Honolulu. She was almost eighteen years old, while her husband was thirty years her senior. He was an uncle of Queen Emma, the wife of Kamehameha IV, on the side of her father George Naʻea. This made her aunt by marriage to Queen Emma, whom she served as her highest ranking lady-in-waiting. Nāmākēhā and Kapiʻolani had no children, although a pregnancy resulted in a miscarriage. For his health the couple voyaged on The Morning Star, a missionary vessel, for months among the Gilbert Islands (present-day Kiribati) but in vain. Nāmākēhā died on December 27, 1860, at Honolulu.

Nāmākēhā and Kapiʻolani were appointed the caretakers of Prince Albert Kamehameha, the only child of Emma and Kamehameha IV. Kapiʻolani was the royal child's chief nurse. The prince died at the age of four, on August 27, 1862, possibly from appendicitis. Historian Helena G. Allen later claimed that Queen Emma blamed Kapiʻolani for the child's death. The prince was under Kapiʻolani's care when he was doused with cold water by the king to calm him during a tantrum. This was traditionally thought to have induced the brain fever which killed the prince. Historian George Kanahele concludes there is little to no evidence of this animosity. Queen Emma wrote Kapiʻolani a very kind reply in her March 1863 letter, "Dear Kapiʻolani, my companion in the caring of my son. You were my son's favorite, your chest must be filled with hurt. You were our third companion... ."

Visiting British dignitaries Jane, Lady Franklin and her niece Sophia Cracroft met "Madame Nāmākēhā" in June 1861. Cracroft wrote:

At last she [Queen Emma] yielded, but sent for his [Prince Albert's] nurse, whom we had not before seen—only heard of. She is the widow of a petty Chief and fulfills her duties exceedingly well. She is rather young and very nice-looking—dressed like us, and in mourning. She went with us, but the dear little child wanted no keeping in order—he was perfectly good.

== Queen of Hawaiʻi ==
Kapiʻolani was remarried on December 19, 1863, to David Kalākaua in a quiet ceremony conducted by an Anglican minister. Their wedding was heavily criticized since it fell during the time of mourning for King Kamehameha IV. The couple settled down at Honuakaha, the Honolulu residence of Kalākaua, that lay makai (seaside) to the Kawaiahaʻo Church.

Her second husband was an aspiring high chief and politician who served in the House of Nobles, the Privy Council of State and held many other court and government posts during the reigns of Kamehameha IV, Kamehameha V and Lunalilo. Although unsuccessful in his attempt for the throne in 1873, Kalākaua defeated Queen Dowager Emma to succeed Lunalilo as the monarch of Hawaiʻi on February 12, 1874. Kapiʻolani became queen consort of Hawaii upon the accession of her husband to the Hawaiian throne. One of the couple's first acts was to conduct a royal progress of the Hawaiian Islands. From March to May 1874, they toured the main Hawaiian Islands of Kauaʻi, Maui, Hawaiʻi Island, Molokaʻi and Oʻahu. The royal pair were enthusiastically received by the people.

Their marriage remained childless. A clinical analysis into the cause of Kalākaua's death led to speculation that the king may have been infertile since Kapiʻolani had a miscarried pregnancy with her previous marriage. Thus, she and her sister Poʻomaikelani adopted, in the tradition of hānai, their sister Kekaulike's three sons. Kapiʻolani took David Kawānanakoa and Jonah Kūhiō Kalanianaʻole and Poʻomaikelani adopted Edward Abnel Keliʻiahonui. In 1883, Kalākaua made Kapiʻolani's nephews princes of Hawaiʻi with the style of Highness in honor of his coronation. After the death of Kekaulike in 1884, Kalākaua and Kapiʻolani assumed legal guardianship over all three boys.

== Coronation ==
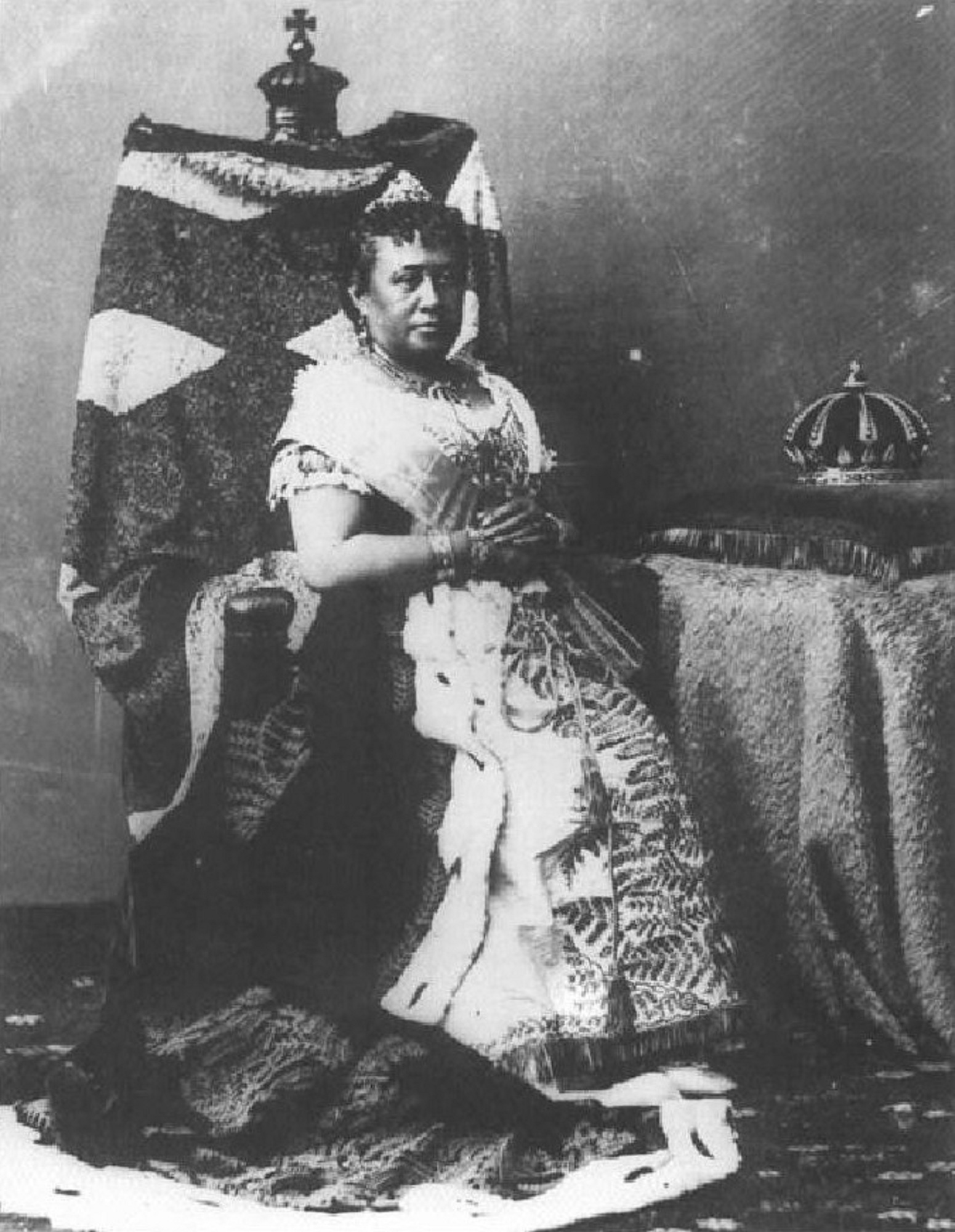
Queen Kapiʻolani and her crown, c. 1883

Kalākaua and Kapiʻolani were crowned in a coronation ceremony on February 12, 1883. They were denied this in 1874 because of the civil unrest following the election. Under Minister of Finance Walter M. Gibson, the 1880 legislature appropriated $10,000 for a coronation. The coronation ceremony and related celebratory events were spread out over a two-week period. A special octagon-shaped pavilion and grandstand were built for the February 12, 1883, ceremony. Preparations were made for an anticipated crowd exceeding 5,000, with lawn chairs to accommodate any overflow. Two crowns of gold and precious stones were commissioned in the United Kingdom, while the wardrobes of Kapiʻolani, the other royal ladies and their attendants were also ordered from abroad.

Kalākaua and Kapiʻolani, accompanied by their royal retinue, came out of the palace onto the event grounds. The coronation was preceded by a choir singing and the formal recitation of the King's official titles. The news coverage noted, "The King looked ill at ease". Chief Justice of Hawaii's Supreme Court Albert Francis Judd officiated and delivered the oath of office to the king. The crown was then handed to Kalākaua, and he placed it upon his head. Kalākaua then placed the smaller crown on Kapiʻolani and stated, "I place this crown upon your head to share the honours of my throne." According to a later apocryphal tale, the king had trouble fitting the crown on the queen's elaborate hair. Her ladies-in-waiting tried in vain to rearrange her hairpins and combs, but the crown still could not fit into place. Thus, the king impatiently jammed the crown onto her head causing her to wince in pain.

The ceremony ended with the choir singing, and a prayer. A planned post-coronation reception by Kalākaua and Kapiʻolani was cancelled without advance notice. Today, Kalākaua's coronation pavilion serves as the bandstand for the Royal Hawaiian Band.

That evening, the royal couple hosted a state dinner, and there was a luau at a later day. The hula was performed nightly on the palace grounds. Regattas, horse races and a number of events filled the celebration period. Due to weather conditions, the planned illumination of the palace and grounds on the day of the coronation happened a week later, and the public was invited to attend. Fireworks displays lit up the sky at the palace and at Punchbowl Crater. A grand ball was held the evening of February 20.

== Medical philanthropy ==
Kapiʻolani shared in her husband Kalākaua's vision of Hoʻoulu Lāhui (increasing the nation) and developed an interest in the health problems plaguing the Hawaiian population at the time. She established the Kapiʻolani Maternity Home, where Hawaiian mothers, as well as their newborn babies, could receive care.

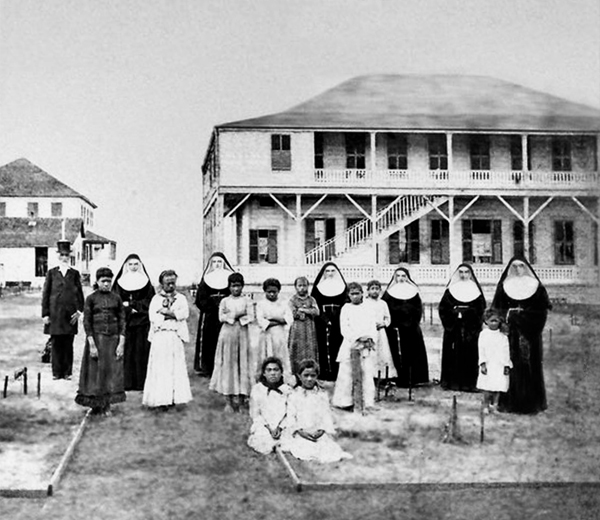
The Sisters of St. Francis and Walter Murray Gibson at the Kapiʻolani Home for Girls, 1886

Kapiʻolani frequently visited Kakaʻako Branch Hospital on Oʻahu, which served as a receiving station for leprosy patients from all over the islands, and befriended Mother Marianne Cope and the other Sisters of Saint Francis. Sister Leopoldina Burns later described how the queen would sit with the sisters drinking coffee and attempting to learn each other's languages.

On July 21, 1884, Kapiʻolani visited the Kalaupapa Leper Settlement on Molokaʻi. Accompanying her was her sister-in-law Princess Liliʻuokalani, the latter's husband John Owen Dominis, and Dr. Eduard Arning. The queen met Father Damien, the Belgian priest who had been caring for the patients for the last decade, and was given a tour of the peninsula including the every homes of the afflicted by luna (resident superintendent) and patient Ambrose K. Hutchison. One of the concerns Hutchison brought to the queen's attention included the welfare of non-leprous children living on the island born to couples with leprosy. Kapiʻolani promised to build a home for these children. After the royal visit, the patients' living conditions improved significantly.

On November 9, 1885, the Kapiʻolani Home for Girls at Kakaʻako was founded for the education of daughters of parents with leprosy with funds raised by the queen's charitable organization. Kalākaua and Kapiʻolani officiated at the dedication ceremony along with Walter Murray Gibson, who was also the president of the Board of Health. During the ceremony, the queen unlocked the doors of the home and presented the key to Mother Marianne Cope. On the same occasion, Cope was decorated with the Royal Order of Kapiʻolani (Note: The Royal Order of Kapiʻolani was named in honor of the High Chiefess Kapiʻolani not Queen Kapiʻolani (Hanley & Bushnell 1991, p. 225–226).) by the king for her service to Hawaiians afflicted with leprosy.

== Golden Jubilee of Queen Victoria ==
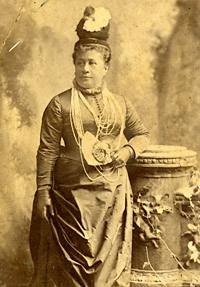
Queen Kapiʻolani wearing Niʻihau necklace at Queen Victoria's Golden Jubilee celebration

In April 1887, Kalākaua sent a delegation to attend the Golden Jubilee of Queen Victoria in London. It included Kapiʻolani, Princess Liliʻuokalani and Liliʻuokalani's husband John Owen Dominis, as well as Court Chamberlain Colonel Curtis P. Iʻaukea acting as the king's official envoy of the King and Colonel James Harbottle Boyd acting as aide-de-camp to the Queen.

The party landed in San Francisco and traveled across the United States visiting Washington, D.C., Boston and New York City, where they boarded a ship for the United Kingdom. While in the American capital, they were received by President Grover Cleveland and his wife Frances.

In London, Kapiʻolani and Liliʻuokalani were granted an audience with Queen Victoria at Buckingham Palace. She greeted both Hawaiian royals with affection and recalled Kalākaua's visit in 1881. They attended the special Jubilee service at Westminster Abbey and were seated with other foreign royal guests, and with members of the Royal Household. Kapiʻolani wore a peacock feathered dress design by her Special Equerry James Washington Lonoikauoalii McGuire.

Shortly after the Jubilee celebrations, they learned of political unrest in Hawaii. Under the threat of death, Kalākaua was forced to sign the Bayonet Constitution which limited the power of the monarch and increased the influence of Euro-American interests in the government. The royal party canceled their tour of Europe and returned to Hawaii.

== Widowhood, death and funeral ==
In declining health, Kalākaua traveled to California aboard the USS Charleston on November 25, 1890. While traveling, the king suffered a stroke in Santa Barbara and was rushed back to San Francisco. He died two days later on January 20. The news of Kalākaua's death did not reach Hawaiʻi until January 29 when the Charleston returned to Honolulu with the king's remains. In Kalākaua's will drafted in 1888, he left all his private property to Kapiʻolani. A proposed line of succession in the will also placed Kapiʻolani third-in-line to the throne after Liliʻuokalani and their niece Princess Kaʻiulani with a provision that Kapiʻolani would serve as a regent in the case that Kaʻiulani ascended before reaching the age of majority.

After the death of her husband and the accession of her sister-in-law Liliʻuokalani to the throne, Queen Dowager Kapiʻolani retired from public life and seldom attended formal social events. Liliʻuokalani ruled for two years before she was overthrown, on January 17, 1893. After a brief transition under the Provisional Government, the oligarchical Republic of Hawaiʻi was established on July 4, 1894, with Sanford B. Dole as president. During this period, the de facto government, which was composed largely of residents of American and European ancestry, sought to annex the islands to the United States against the wishes of the Native Hawaiians who wanted to remain an independent nation ruled by the monarchy.

Kapiʻolani lived out the remainder of her life at her private residence Pualeilani in Waikīkī where the Hyatt Regency Waikiki now stands. Prior to her final illness, she signed over her vast landholdings worth over $250,000 to her nephews Prince Kawānanakoa and Prince Kūhiō. Her health began to fail two years before her death, and she suffered three strokes over this period. During her last days, she was in a comatose state and died on June 24, 1899, at age sixty-four.

Hawaii was annexed to the United States under the Newlands Resolution, a joint resolution of Congress, on August 12, 1898, but the territorial government was not formally established until April 30, 1900. Thus, the Republic of Hawaii's Minister of Foreign Affairs Ernest Augustus Mott-Smith announced the royal funeral to the foreign consular agents in Honolulu. Her body lay in state at Kawaiahaʻo Church for public viewing and her funerary services were performed by the Anglican Bishop Alfred Willis at 2:00 pm on July 2. After the service, a state funeral procession brought her remains for burial at the Royal Mausoleum of Hawaii at Mauna ʻAla. Included among the members of Hawaiian society at her funeral procession were the former royal family: her nephews Prince Kawānanakoa and Prince Kūhiō, her brother-in-law Archibald Scott Cleghorn and her sister-in-law Liliʻuokalani. Officials of the Republic of Hawaii including Sanford B. Dole (still referred to as president) and members of the United States Army and Navy also attended the procession. She was interred in the mausoleum joining her husband and the rest of the House of Kalākaua. In a ceremony officiated by Liliʻuokalani on June 24, 1910, her remains, and those of her husband's family, were transferred for a final time to the underground Kalākaua Crypt after the main mausoleum building had been converted into a chapel.

== Legacy ==
Her medical legacy Kapiʻolani Maternity Home survives today as the Kapiʻolani Medical Center for Women and Children. Kapiʻolani Park in Waikīkī was named after the Queen by her husband Kalākaua. She is also the namesake of Kapiʻolani Boulevard, Kapiʻolani Community College and numerous businesses in Honolulu. One of her noted contributions to Hawaiian music was a love song she composed for her husband, "Ka Ipo Lei Manu". Kalākaua died in San Francisco before he could hear the song from his queen.

A portrait of Queen Kapiʻolani painted in August 1884 by Charles Furneaux, hangs at ʻIolani Palace.

== Bibliography ==
=== Books and journals ===
- Allen, Gwenfread E. (1984). "Queen Kapiolani". In Peterson, Barbara Bennett (ed.). Notable Women of Hawaii. Honolulu: University of Hawaii Press. pp. 204–206. ISBN 978-0-8248-0820-4. OCLC 11030010. Archived from the original on August 10, 2023.
- Allen, Helena G. (1995). Kalakaua: Renaissance King. Honolulu: Mutual Publishing. ISBN 978-1-56647-059-9. OCLC 35083815. Archived from the original on September 20, 2023.
- Bailey, Paul (1975). Those Kings and Queens of Old Hawaii: A Mele to Their Memory. Los Angeles: Westernlore Books. ISBN 978-0-87026-035-3. OCLC 1733260.
- Bott, Robin L. (1997). Homans, Margaret; Munich, Adrienne (eds.). "'I Know What is Due to Me': Self-Fashioning and Legitimization in Queen Liliuokalani's Hawaii's Story by Hawaii's Queen". Remaking Queen Victoria. Cambridge: Cambridge University Press: 140–156. ISBN 978-0-521-57485-3. OCLC 185338494. Archived from the original on July 31, 2023.
- Cracroft, Sophia; Franklin, Jane; Queen Emma (1958). Korn, Alfons L. (ed.). The Victorian Visitors: An Account of the Hawaiian Kingdom, 1861–1866, Including the Journal Letters of Sophia Cracroft: Extracts from the Journals of Lady Franklin, and Diaries and Letters of Queen Emma of Hawaii. Honolulu: University of Hawaii Press. hdl:10125/39981. ISBN 978-0-87022-421-8. OCLC 8989368.
- Court, Official, Professional, And Business Directory. Honolulu: P. C. Advertiser Steam Printing Office. 1884. pp. 18–38. OCLC 12787107.
- Gibson, Walter Murray; Adler, Jacob; Barrett, Gwynn W. (1973). The Diaries of Walter Murray Gibson: 1886, 1887. Honolulu: University Press of Hawaii. ISBN 978-0-8248-0211-0. OCLC 243903716. Archived from the original on September 20, 2023.
- Hanley, Mary Laurence; Bushnell, Oswald A. (1991). Pilgrimage and Exile: Mother Marianne of Molokai. Honolulu: University of Hawaii Press. ISBN 978-0-8248-1387-1. OCLC 27978465.
- Iaukea, Sydney Lehua (2012). The Queen and I: A Story of Dispossessions and Reconnections in Hawaiʻi. Berkeley: University of California Press. ISBN 978-0-520-95030-6. OCLC 763161035.
- Inglis, Kerri A. (2013). Ma'i Lepera: A History of Leprosy in Nineteenth-Century Hawai'i. Honolulu, HI: University of Hawaii Press. ISBN 978-0-8248-6579-5. Archived from the original on October 13, 2022 – via Project MUSE.
- Kaeo, Peter; Queen Emma (1976). Korn, Alfons L. (ed.). News from Molokai, Letters Between Peter Kaeo & Queen Emma, 1873–1876. Honolulu: The University Press of Hawaii. hdl:10125/39980. ISBN 978-0-8248-0399-5. OCLC 2225064.
- Kam, Ralph Thomas (2017). Death Rites and Hawaiian Royalty: Funerary Practices in the Kamehameha and Kalakaua Dynasties, 1819–1953. S. I.: McFarland, Incorporated, Publishers. ISBN 978-1-4766-6846-8. OCLC 966566652. Archived from the original on September 20, 2023.
- Kam, Ralph Thomas (2022). Lost Palaces of Hawaiʻi Royal Residences of the Kingdom Period. S. I.: McFarland, Incorporated, Publishers. ISBN 978-1-4766-8811-4. OCLC 1264273188.
- Kamae, Lori (1980). The Empty Throne. Honolulu: Topgallant Publishing Co. ISBN 978-0-914916-44-4. OCLC 7080687. Archived from the original on September 20, 2023.
- Kanahele, George S. (1999). Emma: Hawaii's Remarkable Queen. Honolulu: University of Hawaii Press. ISBN 978-0-8248-2240-8. OCLC 40890919. Archived from the original on September 20, 2023.
- Kuykendall, Ralph Simpson (1967). The Hawaiian Kingdom 1874–1893, The Kalakaua Dynasty. Vol. 3. Honolulu: University of Hawaii Press. ISBN 978-0-87022-433-1. OCLC 500374815. Archived from the original on January 20, 2015.
- Law, Anwei Skinsnes (2012). Kalaupapa: A Collective Memory (Ka Hokuwelowelo). Honolulu: University of Hawaii Press. ISBN 978-0-8248-6580-1. OCLC 830023588. Archived from the original on October 13, 2022 – via Project MUSE.
- Lewis, Frances R. Hegglund (1969). History of Nursing in Hawaii. Germann-Kilmer Company. ISBN 9780343082659. Archived from the original on September 20, 2023.
- Liliuokalani (1898). Hawaii's Story by Hawaii's Queen, Liliuokalani. Boston: Lee and Shepard. ISBN 978-0-548-22265-2. OCLC 2387226.
- Liliuokalani (1886). Report of Her Majesty Queen Kapiolani's visit to Molokai, by H.R.H. Princess Liliuokalani, July 1884. Honolulu: Printed by the Hawaiian Gazette Company. pp. iii–xvii. OCLC 39817109. Archived from the original on September 20, 2023.
- Lindley, Susan Hill; Stebner, Eleanor J. (2008). The Westminster Handbook to Women in American Religious History. Westminster John Knox Press. ISBN 978-0-664-22454-7. Archived from the original on September 20, 2023.
- Loomis, Albertine (1963). "The Longest Legislature" (PDF). Seventy-First Annual Report of the Hawaiian Historical Society for the Year 1962. 71. Honolulu: Hawaiian Historical Society: 7–27. hdl:10524/35. Archived (PDF) from the original on March 23, 2022.
- Mcdermott, John F.; Choy, Zita Cup; Guerrero, Anthony P. S. (2015). "The Last Illness and Death of Hawaiʻi's King Kalākaua: A New Historical/Clinical Perspective Cover". The Hawaiian Journal of History. 49. Honolulu: Hawaiian Historical Society: 59–72. doi:10.1353/hjh.2015.0002. hdl:10524/56606. OCLC 60626541. Archived from the original on November 3, 2022 – via Project MUSE.
- McKinzie, Edith Kawelohea (1983). Stagner, Ishmael W. (ed.). Hawaiian Genealogies: Extracted from Hawaiian Language Newspapers. Vol. 1. Honolulu: University of Hawaii Press. ISBN 0-939154-28-5. OCLC 12555087. Archived from the original on September 20, 2023.
- Parker, David "Kawika" (2008). "Crypts of the Ali`i The Last Refuge of the Hawaiian Royalty". Tales of Our Hawaiʻi (PDF). Honolulu: Alu Like, Inc. OCLC 309392477. Archived from the original (PDF) on November 11, 2013.
- Pukui, Mary Kawena; Elbert, Samuel H.; Mookini, Esther T. (1974). Place Names of Hawaii. Honolulu: University of Hawaii Press. ISBN 978-0-8248-0524-1. OCLC 1042464. Archived from the original on January 30, 2023.
- Reed, Frances (1974) [1962]. Prince Jonah Kuhio Kalanianaole, 1871–1922. Hilo: Hawaii County Library. OCLC 318062868.
- Reese, Albert Moore (1919). Wanderings in the Orient. Chicago, London: Open Court Publishing Company. OCLC 556316189.
- Richardson, Janine M. (2008). "'None of Them Came for Me:' The Kapiʻolani Home for Girls, 1885–1938". The Hawaiian Journal of History. 42: 1–26. hdl:10524/113. OCLC 60626541.
- Rose, Roger G.; Conant, Sheila; Kjellgren, Eric P. (September 1993). "Hawaiian Standing Kāhili in the Bishop Museum: An Ethnological and Biological Analysis". Journal of the Polynesian Society. 102 (3). Wellington, NZ: Polynesian Society: 273–304. JSTOR 20706518.
- Schweizer, Niklaus Rudolf (2004). His Hawaiian Excellency: The Overthrow of the Hawaiian Monarchy and the Annexation of Hawai'i (3rd ed.). New York: Peter Lang. ISBN 978-0-8204-6871-6. OCLC 55682174.
- Schweizer, Niklaus Rudolf (1999). Turning Tide: The Ebb and Flow of Hawaiian Nationality. Berne, NY: Peter Lang. ISBN 978-3-906762-00-5. OCLC 41445703. Archived from the original on September 20, 2023.
- Silva, Noenoe K. (2004). Aloha Betrayed: Native Hawaiian Resistance to American Colonialism. Durham: Duke University Press. ISBN 0-8223-8622-4. OCLC 191222123. Archived from the original on September 20, 2023.
- Taylor, Albert Pierce (1927). The Rulers of Hawaii, The Chiefs and Chiefesses, Their Palaces, Monuments, Portraits and Tombs. Honolulu: Advertiser Publishing Company. OCLC 9380797.
- Taylor, Albert Pierce (1922). Under Hawaiian Skies: A Narrative of the Romance, Adventure and History of the Hawaiian Islands. Honolulu: Advertiser Publishing Company, Ltd. OCLC 479709.
- Tsai, Tiffany Lani Ing (2014). ""He Ka Waiho Hoʻohemahema": Kana Maoli Responses to King Kalakaua's Tour of the Kingdom from 1874 Newspapers in Hawaiʻi". Hawaiian Journal of History. 48. Honolulu: Hawaiian Historical Society: 115–143. hdl:10524/47258. OCLC 60626541.
- Webb, Nancy; Webb, Jean Francis (1998) [1962]. Kaiulani: Crown Princess of Hawaii. Honolulu: Mutual Publishing. ISBN 978-1-56647-206-7. OCLC 265217757.
- Zambucka, Kristin (2002). Kalakaua: Hawaiʻi's Last King. Honolulu: Māna Publishing Company. ISBN 978-0-931897-04-7. OCLC 123305738. Archived from the original on September 20, 2023.
- Zambucka, Kristin (1998). Princess Ka'iulani of Hawaiʻi: The Monarchy's Last Hope. Honolulu: Mutual Publishing. ISBN 978-1-56647-710-9. OCLC 149442849. Archived from the original on September 20, 2023.

=== Newspapers and online sources ===
- "All Hawaii Mourns the Death of Kapiolani". The San Francisco Call. San Francisco. July 5, 1899. p. 12. Archived from the original on August 7, 2022.
- "Crowned! Kalakaua's Coronation Accomplished: A Large But Unenthusiastic Assemblage". The Hawaiian Gazette. Honolulu. February 14, 1883. p. 2. Archived from the original on December 29, 2017.
- "An Act". The Hawaiian Gazette. Honolulu. August 4, 1880. p. 5. Archived from the original on March 24, 2022.
- "Namakeha-Kapiolani marriage record". Marriages – Oahu (1832–1910). Hawaii State Archives. 2006. p. 405. Archived from the original on August 7, 2022 – via Ulukau, the Hawaiian Electronic Library.
- "Kalakaua's Will – Relates Mainly to the Succession – The Entire Private Estate Goes to the Queen Dowager". Evening Bulletin. Honolulu. March 5, 1891. p. 3. Archived from the original on December 22, 2022.
- "Postponed Pleasures". The Hawaiian Gazette. Honolulu. February 21, 1883. p. 2. Archived from the original on March 24, 2022.
- "Queen Dowager Kapiolani Passes Away – Death Came at 8:45 This Morning – Peaceful Ending of a Well Rounded Life". Evening Bulletin. Honolulu. June 24, 1899. pp. 1, 4. Archived from the original on August 7, 2022.
- "A Queen Called – Death of the Widow of the Late Kalakaua R. – Had Long Been Ill – Passes Away At Her Waikiki Home Closing Scenes – Funeral Arrangements". The Pacific Commercial Advertiser. Honolulu. June 26, 1899. pp. 1, 4, 9. Archived from the original on August 16, 2022.
- Taylor, Clarice B. (April 7, 1958). "Kapiolani, Queen Consort of Kalakaua". Honolulu Star-Bulletin. Honolulu. p. 24. Archived from the original on August 7, 2022.
- Taylor, Clarice B. (April 10, 1958). "H.R.H. Poʻomaikelani Kapoʻoloku". Honolulu Star-Bulletin. Honolulu. p. 28. Archived from the original on August 7, 2022.
- Taylor, Clarice B. (April 11, 1958). "H.R.H. Kinoike Kekaulike". Honolulu Star-Bulletin. Honolulu. p. 34. Archived from the original on August 7, 2022.
- Thrum, Thomas G., ed. (1909). "New Kalakaua Dynasty Tomb". All About Hawaii: The Recognized Book of Authentic Information on Hawaii. Vol. 36. Honolulu: Honolulu Star-Bulletin. pp. 105–110. Archived from the original on September 20, 2023.
- Tsutsumi, Cheryl Chee; Choy, Zita Cup (December 24, 2017). "An evening to honor Queen Kapiʻolani". Honolulu Star-Advertiser. Honolulu. p. E3. Archived from the original on August 7, 2022.

Royal titles
Vacant Title last held by Queen Emma	Queen consort of Hawaii; 1874–1891	Succeeded by John Owen Dominis as prince consort
