= Victoria Kinoiki Kekaulike =

Victoria Kinoiki Kekaulike II
- Princess of Hawaiʻi
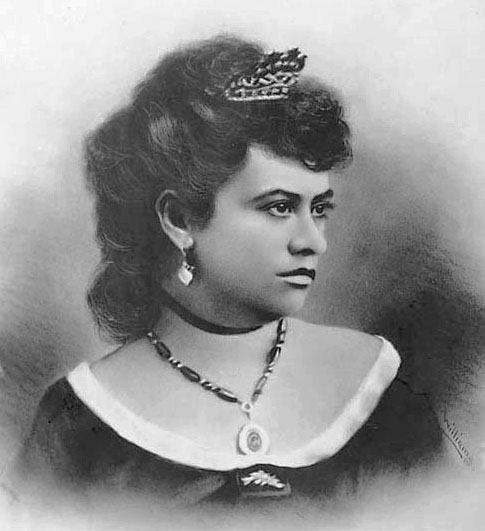
- Born: May 12, 1843; Hilo, Hawaiʻi
- Died: January 8, 1884 (aged 40); Honolulu, Oʻahu
- Burial: January 11, 1884; Mauna Ala Royal Mausoleum
- Spouse: David Kahalepouli Piʻikoi
- Issue: David Kawānanakoa; Edward Abnel Keliʻiahonui; Jonah Kūhiō Kalanianaʻole
Names
- Victoria Kūhiō Kinoiki Kekaulike II
- House: Kalākaua
- Father: Kūhiō Kalanianaʻole
- Mother: Kinoiki Kekaulike

Victoria Kūhiō Kinoiki Kekaulike II (1843–1884) was a Princess of the Kingdom of Hawaiʻi. Her name also sometimes spelled as Kinoike Kekaulike has been written as Mary Kinoiki Kekaulike in many sources. Her name Kekaulike translates as "the equality" in Hawaiian.

== Life ==
She was born on May 12, 1843, the youngest daughter of High Chief Kūhiō Kalanianaʻole of Hilo, and Princess Kinoiki Kekaulike from Kauaʻi island. From her father she was cousin of the Kamehameha Dynasty being in the line of Keawe and she was a cousin of Kalākaua through their common ancestor the High Chiefess Ululani of Hilo. Her mother was the stepdaughter of the Queen Regent Kaʻahumanu and the daughter of Kaumualiʻi, the last king of Kauaʻi before he agreed to be a vassal to Kamehameha I in 1810. She was the youngest sister of Kapiʻolani (later Queen Consort of Kalākaua) and Princess Poʻomaikelani. She took the name Kekaulike from her mother and great-great grandfather, King Kekaulike of Maui.

On February 25, 1861, she married High Chief David Kahalepouli Piʻikoi and they had three sons. David Kahalepouli Kawānanakoa was born February 19, 1868; Edward Abnel Keliʻiahonui, born May 13, 1869; Jonah Kūhiō Kalanianaʻole, the youngest born on March 26, 1871. Her sons were adopted by her sisters Queen Kapiʻolani and Princess Poʻomaikelani after her death. Her sons were granted the title of Princes and style His Highness.

Her sister's husband became the king of Hawaii in 1874, so she was granted the title of Princess and style of Her Royal Highness, at 1883 at Kalākaua's coronation. In the coronation ceremony, she had the honor of carrying Kalākaua's royal feather cape, passed down from the days of Kamehameha I. She handed the royal mantle to Chief Justice Albert Francis Judd who placed it on the king's shoulders "as of the Ensign of Knowledge and Wisdom". She served from 1880 to 1884 as Governor of Hawaii Island, succeeding Princess Miriam Likelike, the sister-in-law of Queen Kapiʻolani.

== Death ==
Princess Kekaulike started to suffer from what was termed a "heart disease", a year after Kalākaua's coronation, and during her illness received a visit from Mother Marianne Cope. She was unable to recover and died at her Ululani residence, in Honolulu, on January 8, 1884.

Her funeral expenses added up to $1,931.36. She was interred in the Kalākaua Crypt at the Royal Mausoleum of Hawaii. In her will, she gave her Beretania street residence Ululani, as the site of a proposed maternity home to help Hawaiian mothers, which later became the Kapiolani Medical Center for Women and Children.

== Ancestry ==
Ancestors of Victoria Kinoiki Kekaulike

16. Kalaninuiamamao
8. Keawemauhili
17. Kekaulike-i-Kawekiuonalani (=23)
4. Elelule Laʻakeaelelulu
18. Mokulani
9. ʻUlulani
19. Papaikaniau
2. Kūhiō Kalanianaʻole
20. Keʻeaumoku Nui
10. Kanekoa
21. Kailakanoa
5. Poʻomaikelani
22. Kepoʻomahoe
11. Kalanikauleleiawi-a-Kepoomahoe
23. Kekaulike-i-Kawekiuonalani (=17)
1. Victoria Kinoiki Kekaulike
24. Kekaulike
12. Kāʻeokūlani
25. Haʻaloʻu
6. Kaumualiʻi
26. Kaumeheiwa
13. Kamakahelei
27. Kaʻapuwai
3. Kinoiki Kekaulike
14. Palikua?
7. Kaʻapuwai Kapuaʻamohu
30. Kaneoneo
15. Kawalu?
31. Kamakahelei

Preceded by Princess Miriam Likelike	Governor of Hawaii Island; 1880–1884	Succeeded by Princess Virginia Poʻomaikelani
