= Edward Abnel Keliʻiahonui =

Prince of Hawaiʻi (1869–1887)

- Prince of Hawaiʻi
- Keliʻiahonui at school in 1887
- Born: May 13, 1869; Kaʻalaʻa, Honolulu, Oʻahu
- Died: September 21, 1887 (aged 18) ʻIolani Palace, Honolulu, Oʻahu
- Burial: September 25, 1887; Mauna ʻAla Royal Mausoleum
Names
- Edward Abnel Keliʻiahonui
- House: House of Kalākaua
- Father: David Kahalepouli Piʻikoi
- Mother: Victoria Kekaulike Kinoiki; Poʻomaikelani (hānai)
- Religion: Church of Hawaii

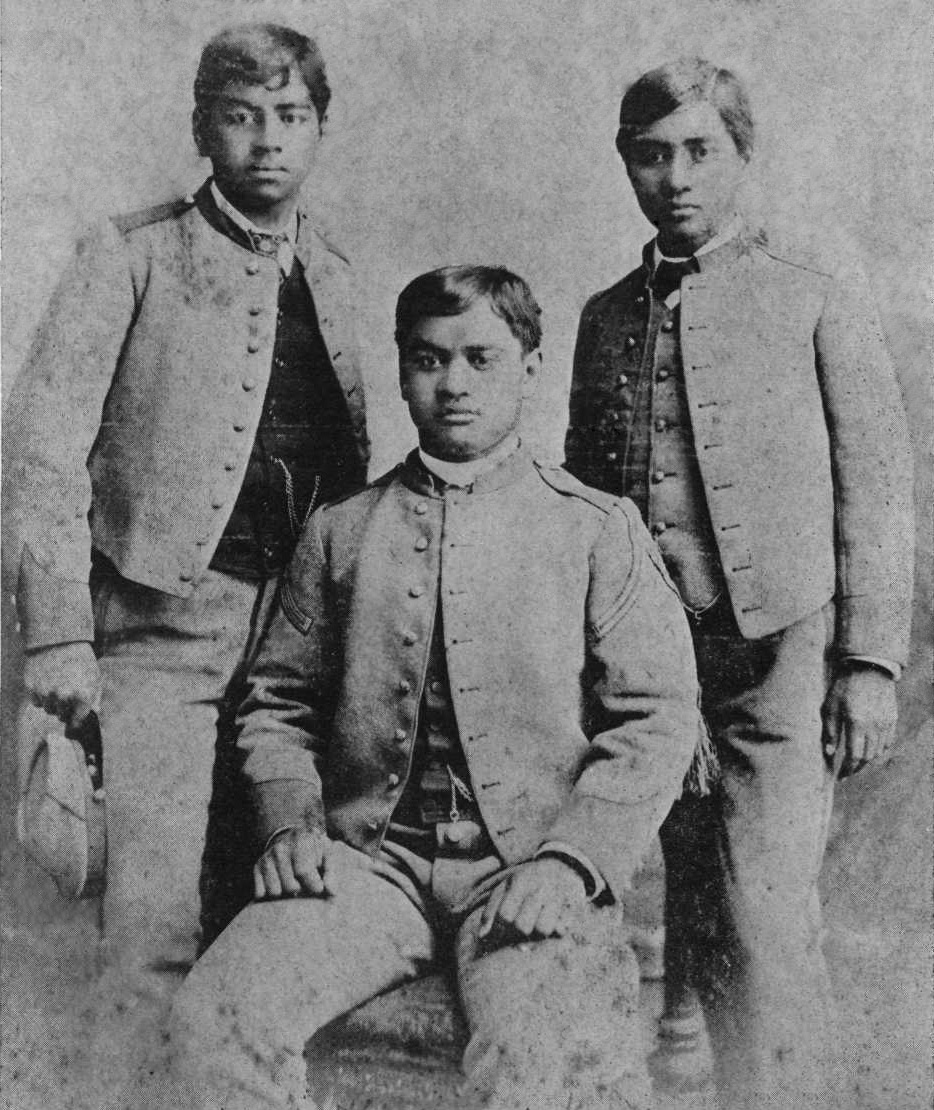
The Princes of Hawaii at San Mateo. Left to right: Kalanianaʻole, Kawānanakoa and Keliʻiahonui

Edward Abnel Keliʻiahonui (May 13, 1869 – September 21, 1887) was a prince of the Kingdom of Hawaiʻi. His name means "the chief whose strength is attained through patience".

== Early life ==
Keliʻiahonui was born May 13, 1869, at Kaʻalaʻa at the mouth of the Pauoa Valley, in Honolulu, on the old homestead of his aunt Queen Kapiʻolani. He was baptized by Bishop Thomas Nettleship Staley of the St. Andrew's Cathedral. His genealogy centered mainly on his ancestry as an heir of his great-grandfather Kaumualiʻi, the last ruling King of Kauaʻi. He shared his name with his great-uncle Kealiʻiahonui who was sometimes called the last prince of Kauaʻi. His mother Princess Victoria Kinoiki Kekaulike was sister of Queen Kapiʻolani. His father was High Chief David Kahalepouli Piʻikoi, first cousin of King Kalākaua. Keliʻiahonui was initially educated at St. Alban's College (now ʻIolani School) and Punahou School. In 1885, he and his brothers David Kawānanakoa and Jonah Kūhiō Kalanianaʻole were sent abroad along with to attend Saint Matthew's School, a private Episcopal military school in San Mateo, California.

== Prince of Hawaii ==
In 1874 the Kalākaua Dynasty ascended to the throne of the Kingdom of Hawaiʻi, ending the Kamehameha Dynasty. On February 10, 1883, Keliʻiahonui was granted by letters patent the title of Prince and style of His Royal Highness by King Kalākaua along with his mother, brothers and aunt. Keliʻiahonui was not mentioned in the first-person accounts of the coronation ceremony for Kalākaua and Kapiʻolani coronation ceremony on February 14 of the same year despite his mother, aunts and brothers playing important parts in the ceremony.

The three brothers were known as the Piʻikoi Brothers or the "Three Princes". Being the middle son, he was in a difficult position. A year younger than his brother David, he was physically smaller than either of his brothers. He also fought illness more frequently. His brothers were adopted sons of the king and queen. He was adopted in the Hawaiian tradition of hānai to his aunt Princess Poʻomaikelani, while his brothers were adopted by King Kalākaua and Queen Kapiʻolani.

While attending school in San Mateo, Edward and his brothers would travel south to the Pacific seashore at Santa Cruz. The brothers demonstrated the Hawaiian sport of board surfing to the locals, becoming the first California surfers in the summer of 1885. The historic first was reported on July 20, 1885, in the Santa Cruz Daily, "The young Hawaiian Princes were in the water enjoying it hugely and giving interesting exhibitions of surf board swimming as practiced in their native land."

Keliʻiahonui's health had always been weaker than his brothers. In 1887, Keliʻiahonui was sent home ill with typhoid fever from school in California. He died of typhoid fever at ʻIolani Palace shortly after arriving home on September 21, 1887, aged eighteen. He was buried in the Kalakaua Crypt, Royal Mausoleum called Mauna ʻAla in Nuʻuanu Valley, Oʻahu. Prince Edward Street in Waikiki is named after him.

== Bibliography ==
- Kamae, Lori (1980). The Empty Throne. Honolulu: Topgallant Publishing Co. ISBN 978-0-914916-44-4.
- Linnea, Sharon (1999). Princess Kaʻiulani: Hope of a Nation, Heart of a People. Grand Rapids, MI: Eerdmans Young Readers. ISBN 978-0-8028-5088-1. OCLC 36727806.
- Liliʻuokalani (1898). Hawaii's Story by Hawaii's Queen, Liliʻuokalani. Boston: Lee & Shepard. ISBN 978-0-548-22265-2. OCLC 2387226.
- Parker, David "Kawika" (2008). "Crypts of the Ali`i The Last Refuge of the Hawaiian Royalty". Tales of Our Hawaiʻi (PDF). Honolulu: Alu Like, Inc. OCLC 309392477. Archived from the original (PDF) on November 11, 2013.
- Pukui, Mary Kawena; Elbert, Samuel H.; Mookini, Esther T. (1974). Place Names of Hawaii. Honolulu: University of Hawaii Press. ISBN 978-0-8248-0524-1.
- Reed, Frances (1962). Prince Jonah Kuhio Kalanianaole, 1871–1922. Hilo: Hawaii County Library.
- Thrum, Thomas G., ed. (1920). "The Passing of Kuhio Prince-Delegate". All About Hawaii: The Recognized Book of Authentic Information on Hawaii. Honolulu: Honolulu Star-Bulletin. pp. 43–47.
