= Kealiʻiahonui =

Nobility of the Hawaiian Kingdom

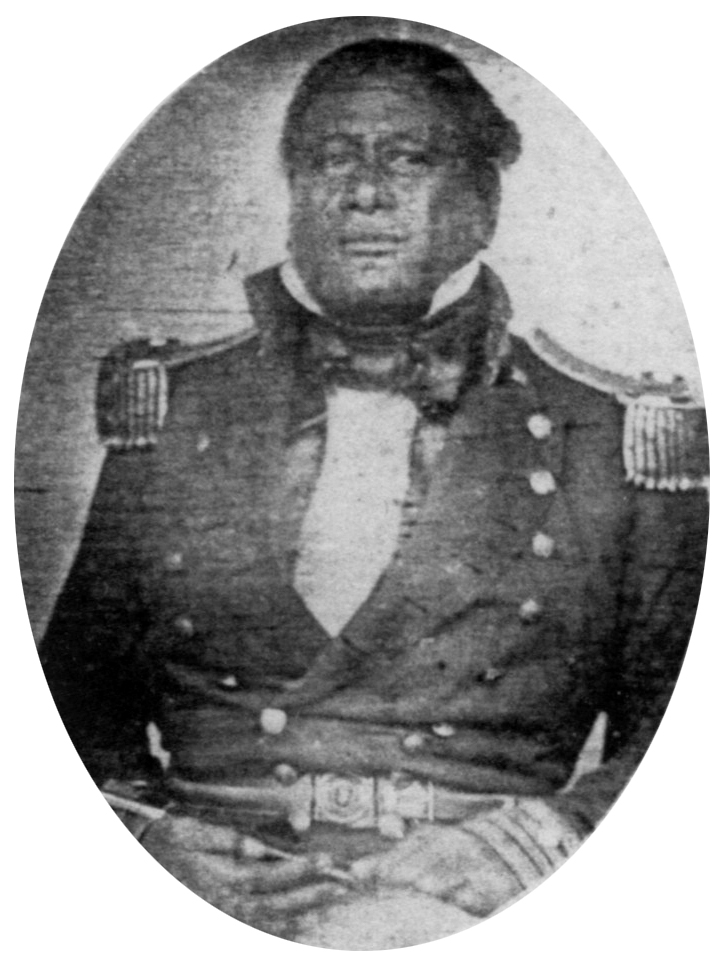
- Born: August 17, 1800; Kauaʻi
- Died: June 23, 1849 (aged 48); Honolulu, Oʻahu
- Burial: at sea
- Spouse: Kapule; Kaʻahumanu; Kekauʻōnohi
Names
- Aaron (Aarona) Kealiʻiahonui
- House: Kingdom of Kauaʻi
- Father: King Kaumualiʻi of Kauaʻi
- Mother: Kaʻapuwai Kapuaʻamohu

Aaron Kealiʻiahonui (1800–1849) was member of the nobility of the Kingdom of Kauaʻi and the Kingdom of Hawaii. He is often called Keliʻiahonui, a contraction of Kealiʻiahonui. His name was given to him by his father Kaumualiʻi in honor of King Kamehameha I's peaceful takeover of Kauai and means the "king whose strength is attained through patience".

== Family life ==
Kealiʻiahonui was born on August 17, 1800. His father was Kaumualiʻi, the last ruling King of Kauaʻi and his mother was Kaʻapuwai Kapuaʻamohu. In 1810, his father agreed to become a vassal to Kamehameha I, ensuring that he would never become a ruling monarch. In 1821, his father was forced into exile, and to emphasize their submission, he married Queen Regent Kaʻahumanu.

After his father died in 1824, and following a failed rebellion led by his half-brother Humehume, Queen Kaʻahumanu forced Kealiʻiahonui into a similar relationship. Kealiʻiahonui gave up his first wife, Deborah Kapule, who symbolically married Kaʻahumanu. Following this, there were no more rebellions from Kauaʻi. However, the missionaries disliked these forced marriages, and hoped education would convert them.

Kealiʻiahonui was described as "...handsome, and naturally and usually more interesting at that period than most of the nobility". Physically, he was 6 feet 6 inches (1.98 m) tall "...considered to be the handsomest chief in the Islands, and was proficient in all athletic exercises".

On December 5, 1825, he was part of a royal baptism ceremony where he took the Christian name "Aaron".

After Kaʻahumanu died in 1832, he married for a third time, to Kekauōnohi, a granddaughter of Kamehameha I and former Queen Consort. He had no children who lived to adulthood.

== Politics ==
In 1840 he was finally allowed to participate in leadership positions. It was his wife Kekauʻōnohi, however, who was officially made Royal Governor of Kauaʻi at this time. He was named in the 1840 Constitution of the Kingdom of Hawaii as one of the founding members of the legislature's upper house, the House of Nobles. He served in the 1842 through 1848 sessions of the legislature. In 1845 he served as royal chamberlain, and from 1845 to 1847, he was included in the Privy Council of King Kamehameha III.

Kealiʻiahonui died on June 23, 1849, in Honolulu. His niece, named Kapule after his first wife, looked after him before his death. He had a public funeral on June 30. It was a combination of Christian and ancient Hawaiian practices. His coffin was taken to a cave in an area known as Puʻuloa (near modern-day Pearl Harbor). Although Kekauʻōnohi had wanted a burial at sea, Kapule and her husband hid the coffin until they were convinced to offer it to the spirits that were thought to inhabit this area. His grandnephew was named Edward Abnel Keliʻiahonui (1869–1887) after him.
