= Kaumualiʻi =

- Aliʻi nui of Kauaʻi and Niʻihau
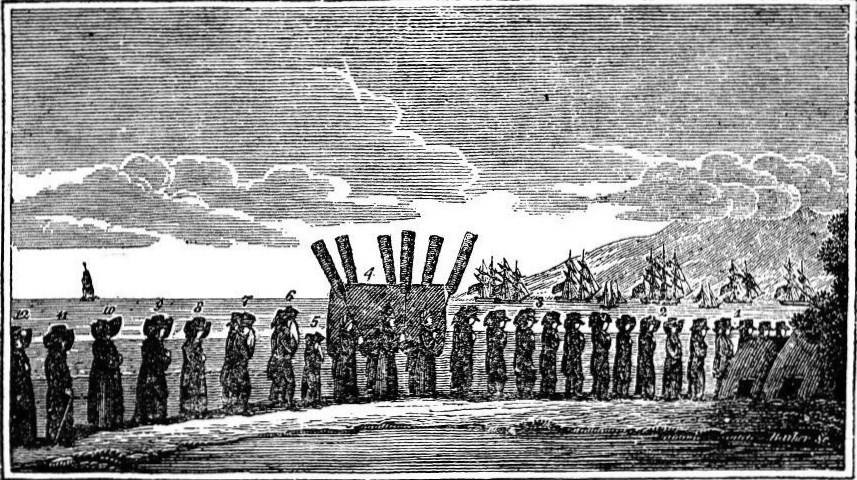
- Kaumualiʻi and Kaʻahumanu, number 8, in the funeral procession of Queen Keōpūolani, 1823.
- Born: c. 1778; Holoholokū Heiau, Wailua, kingdom of Kauaʻi
- Died: May 26, 1824 (aged 46); Honolulu, Hawaiian Kingdom
- Burial: May 30, 1824; Halekamani (until c. 1837); Mokuʻula (until c. 1884); Waiola Church, Maui
- Spouse: Kawalu; Kaʻapuwai Kapuaʻamohu; Naluahi; Kekaihaʻakūlou; Kaʻahumanu
- Issue: Humehume; Kealiʻiahonui; Kinoiki Kekaulike
- Father: Kāʻeokūlani
- Mother: Kamakahelei

Kaumualiʻi (c. 1778–May 26, 1824) was the last independent aliʻi nui of Kauaʻi and Niʻihau before becoming the vassal of Kamehameha I within the unified Hawaiian Kingdom in 1810. He was the 23rd high chief of Kauaʻi and reigned from 1794 to 1810.

Although he was sometimes known as George Kaumualiʻi, he should not be confused with his son, who is more commonly known by that name.

In Hanamāʻulu, Hawaii, King Kaumuali'i Elementary School is named after him.

== Family ==
Kaumualiʻi was the only son of the queen regnant (aliʻi nui or aliʻi aimoku) of Kauaʻi and Niʻihau, Kamakahelei, and her husband, Aliʻi Kāʻeokūlani (c. 1754–1794), regent of Maui and Molokaʻi. Kāʻeokūlani was the younger son of Kekaulike, the 23rd aliʻi aimoku and mōʻī of Maui. He became the co-king and effective ruler of Kauaʻi by his marriage.

When Kamakahelei died in 1794, she passed their titles and positions to the 16-year-old Kaumualiʻi, who reigned under the regency of Chief Inamoʻo until he came of age. His first wife and consort was his half-sister Kawalu of Oʻahu. His second wife was his half-sister Kaʻapuwai Kapuaʻamohu of Kōloa; his third and final wife was the queen regent Kaʻahumanu (1768–1832), Kamehameha's widow.

== Unification ==
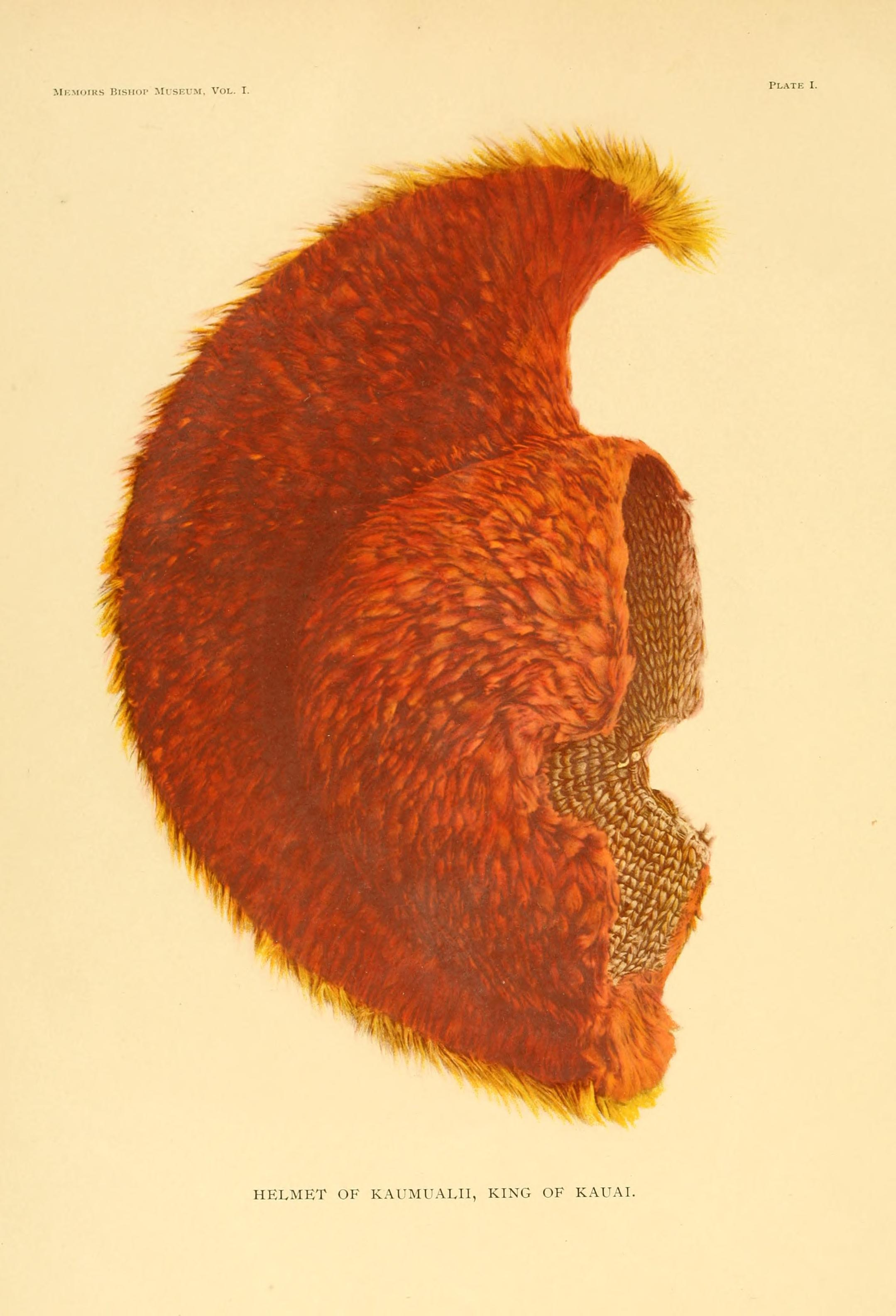
Mahiole of Kaumualiʻi, currently at the Bishop Museum.

Kauaʻi and Niʻihau had eluded Kamehameha's control since he first tried to add them to his kingdom in 1796, a year after Kaumualiʻi became king. At that time, the governor of the Island of Hawai'i led a rebellion against Kamehameha, forcing him to return home. Kamehameha tried again in 1803, but disease ravaged his armies, and he called a retreat to heal his men and work on his strategy. Over the next years, Kamehameha amassed the largest armada Hawaiʻi had ever seen: foreign-built schooners and massive war canoes armed with cannons to carry his vast army. Kaumualiʻi decided to negotiate a peaceful resolution rather than resort to bloodshed. The move was supported by Kamehameha as well as the people of Kauaʻi and the foreign sandalwood merchants on the island, whose trade was hurt by the constant feuding. In 1810, Kaumualiʻi met face to face with Kamehameha in Honolulu and negotiated a peaceful surrender, acknowledging Kamehameha as supreme ruler, Kauaʻi as a tributary domain under Kingdom of Hawaiʻi and was able to remain in power to govern the island. He agreed that Kamehameha's heir would rule Kauaʻi after his own death.

In 1815, a ship from the Russian-American Company, the Bering, was wrecked on Kaua'i. RAC Governor Alexander Andreyevich Baranov dispatched another ship, the Isabella, to retrieve the cargo from the Bering. In 1816, Kaumualiʻi signed an agreement to let Georg Anton Schäffer and his Russian crew build the forts Alexander and Barclay-de-Tolly. The Hawaiian fort, Paʻulaʻula o Hipo, was renamed Fort Elizabeth in later decades and attributed to the Russians. Construction began in 1817 but, by fall of that year, the Russians were expelled.

In 1817, Kaumuali'i married Kekaihaʻakūlou, who became known as Deborah Kapule.

Kamehameha I died in 1819, and the Hawaiians grew fearful that Kaumualiʻi would sever Kauaʻi's relationship with the united Hawaiʻi. Kamehameha's widow, Kaʻahumanu, was the effective political force in the kingdom. On September 16, 1821, the new young King Kamehameha II arrived and invited Kaumualiʻi aboard his ship. That night, they sailed to Honolulu, where Kaumualiʻi was effectively under house arrest. To make the domination clear, Kaʻahumanu forced him to marry her to ensure the island chain's stable union. They remained officially married until his death on May 26, 1824, but had no children. By his wishes, his body was taken to Maui, and buried next to Queen Keōpūolani at the tomb of Halekamani in Lahaina. Their remains were transferred to a tomb on the island of Mokuʻula sometime in 1837 and to the cemetery of Waiola Church in 1884.

Kaumualiʻi was popular among both his people and foreigners who visited and worked on his islands. Captain George Vancouver, who gave the young king a flock of sheep as a gift in 1792, was thanked with a lavish banquet and described his host glowingly. Kaumualiʻi was described as handsome, likeable, and courteous, as well as a capable leader. Upon his death, the people of Kauaʻi sincerely mourned him.

== Successors ==
After Kaumualiʻi's death in 1824, his son by sacred wife Kawalu, daughter of Kamakahelei and ali'i Kiha of Ni'ihau, George "Prince" Kaumualiʻi Humehume (1797–1826), also known as George Tamoree, attempted to reestablish the independence of Kauaʻi but was also eventually captured and taken to Honolulu, where he died of influenza. He had three offspring, a son who died young, a daughter born in 1821 who was given away to another chiefess on Kaua'i, and Harriet Kawahinekipi Kaumualiʻi. Humehume's half-brother Kealiʻiahonui was also forced to marry Kaʻahumanu. Kaʻahumanu later abandoned Kealiʻiahonui and embraced Christianity. Kealiʻiahonui later married Princess Kekauōnohi, the governess of Maui and Kauaʻi and a widow of Kamehameha II.

King Kaumualiʻi's granddaughter Kapiʻolani of Hilo (eldest daughter of Kaumualiʻi's daughter Kekaulike Kinoiki) married King Kalākaua. In 1874, the Hawaiian legislature elected the couple king and queen of the Hawaiian Islands as King Kalākaua and Queen Kapiʻolani. Kapi'olani's youngest sister, Princess Victoria Kuhio Kinoike Kekaulike of Hilo, was later appointed governor of Kauaʻi, princess and royal highness. Princess Victoria's other sister, Princess Virginia Kapoʻoloku Poʻomaikelani, succeeded her sister as governor of Kauaʻi and was made Guardian of the Royal Tombs.

Hawaii Route 50 on Kauaʻi is named "Kaumualiʻi Highway" in honor of Kaua'i's last high chief.

== See also ==
- Hawaii–Tahiti relations

Preceded by Queen Kamakahelei	Aliʻi ʻAimoku of Kauaʻi and Niʻihau; 1795–1810	Succeeded by Kingdom of Hawaii
Preceded by first	Royal Governor of Kauaʻi; 1810–1824	Succeeded by Kahalaiʻa Luanuʻu
