= Francis Morgan =

Francis Morgan may refer to:

- Francis S. Morgan (1919–1999), Hawaiian businessman
- Francis Xavier Morgan (1857–1935), Catholic priest

== See also ==
- Frank Morgan (disambiguation)
