= Kaʻiulani =

Princess of the Hawaiian Islands (1875–1899)

- Princess of the Hawaiian Islands
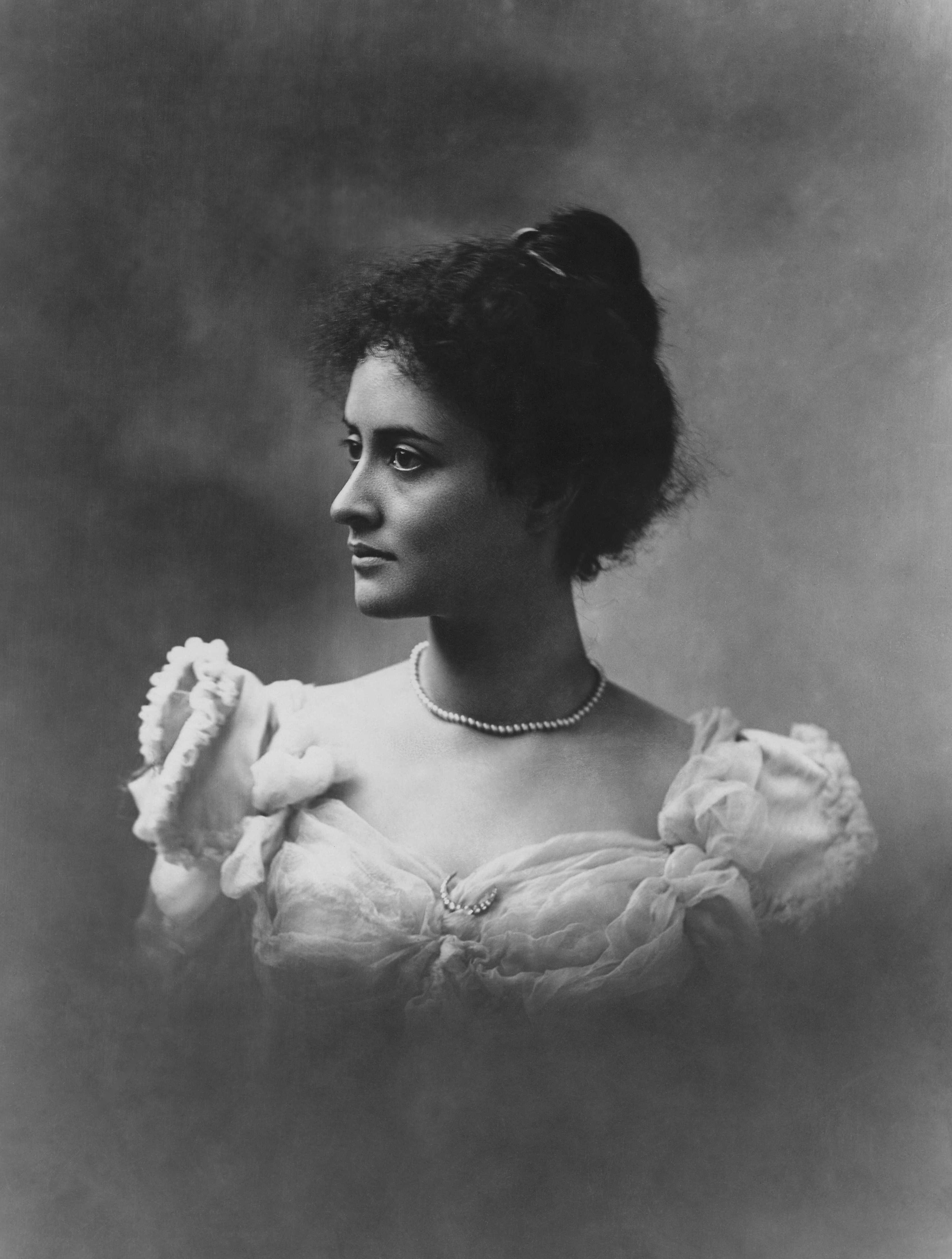
- Kaʻiulani in 1897
- Born: October 16, 1875; Honolulu, Oʻahu, Hawaiian Kingdom
- Died: March 6, 1899 (aged 23) ʻĀinahau, Honolulu, Oʻahu, Territory of Hawaii
- Burial: March 12, 1899; Royal Mausoleum of Hawaii, Honolulu, Hawaii, U.S.
Names
- Victoria Kawēkiu Kaʻiulani Lunalilo Kalaninuiahilapalapa Cleghorn
- House: Kalākaua
- Father: Archibald Scott Cleghorn
- Mother: Princess Miriam Likelike
- Religion: Church of Hawaii (Anglicanism)

Princess Kaʻiulani (Hawaiian pronunciation: [kəʔiuˈlɐni]; Victoria Kawēkiu Kaʻiulani Lunalilo Kalaninuiahilapalapa Cleghorn; October 16, 1875 – March 6, 1899) was a Hawaiian royal, the only child of Princess Miriam Likelike, and the last heir apparent to the throne of the Hawaiian Kingdom. She was the niece of King Kalākaua and Queen Liliʻuokalani. After the death of her mother, Kaʻiulani was sent to Europe at age 13 to complete her education under the guardianship of British businessman and Hawaiian sugar investor Theo H. Davies. She had not yet reached her eighteenth birthday when the 1893 overthrow of the Hawaiian Kingdom altered her life. The Committee of Safety rejected proposals from both her father Archibald Scott Cleghorn, and provisional president Sanford B. Dole, to seat Kaʻiulani on the throne, conditional upon the abdication of Liliʻuokalani. The Queen thought the Kingdom's best chance at justice was to relinquish her power temporarily to the United States.

Davies and Kaʻiulani visited the United States to urge the Kingdom's restoration; she made speeches and public appearances denouncing the overthrow of her government and the injustice toward her people. While in Washington, D.C. she paid an informal visit to President Grover Cleveland and First Lady Frances Cleveland, but her efforts were in vain. The situation put both Kaʻiulani and her father in dire financial straits. Her annual government stipend ceased, and her father's income as a government employee came to an end. Father and daughter spent the years 1893–1897 drifting among the European aristocracy, relatives and family friends in England, Wales, Scotland and Paris, before finally returning to Hawaii.

After arriving back in Hawaii in 1897, Kaʻiulani settled into life as a private citizen and busied herself with social engagements. She and Liliʻuokalani boycotted the 1898 annexation ceremony and mourned the loss of Hawaiian independence. However, she later hosted the American congressional delegation in charge of formalizing the Hawaiian Organic Act. She suffered from chronic health problems throughout the 1890s and died at her home at ʻĀinahau in 1899.

== Name ==
Kaʻiulani was born at Honolulu, on the island of Oʻahu, in the Hawaiian Kingdom. At her christening, she was named Victoria Kawēkiu Kaʻiulani Lunalilo Kalaninuiahilapalapa Cleghorn. In 1898, her aunt Liliʻuokalani wrote it as Victoria Kaʻiulani, Kalaninuiahilapalapa, Kawēkiu i Lunalilo or Victoria Kawēkiu Lunalilo Kalaninuiahilapalapa Kaʻiulani Cleghorn in her memoir Hawaii's Story by Hawaii's Queen. Kaʻiulani was named after her maternal aunt Anna Kaʻiulani who died young, and Queen Victoria of the United Kingdom, whose help restored the sovereignty and independence of the Hawaiian Kingdom during the reign of Kamehameha III. Her primary Hawaiian name comes from ka ʻiu lani which means or "the royal sacred one" in the Hawaiian language. Kawēkiu means "the highest rank or station". At the request of Charles Kanaʻina, she was also given the name Lunalilo, translated as Luna ('high') lilo ('lost') or "so high up as to be lost to sight", after Kanaʻina's son and her uncle King Kalākaua's predecessor King Lunalilo (r. 1873–74) to strengthen her eligibility for the throne. The name Kalaninuiahilapalapa signified her association with the royal house of Keawe (traditional rulers of the island of Hawaii) and the flames of the torch that burns at midday, a symbol of kapu, used by the House of Kalākaua from their ancestor Iwikauikaua.

== Early life and family: 1875–1887 ==
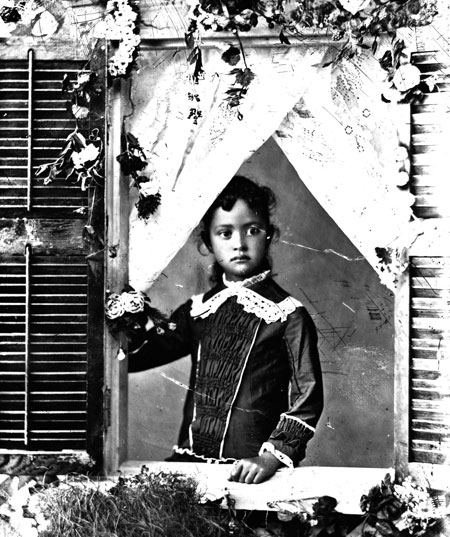
Kaʻiulani as a little girl, c. 1881

Kaʻiulani was the only child of Princess Miriam Likelike and Scottish businessman Archibald Scott Cleghorn. She was born in a downstairs bedroom of her parents' Emma Street mansion in Honolulu, on October 16, 1875, during the reign of her uncle King Kalākaua. Her birth was announced by gun salutes and the ringing of all of the bells in the city's churches. At the time of her birth, she became fourth in line of succession to the throne, moving to third in the line of succession upon the death of her uncle Leleiohoku II in 1877. She had three older half-sisters: Rose Kaipuala, Helen Maniʻiailehua, and Annie Pauahi, from her father's previous union with a Hawaiian woman.

Through her mother, she descended from Keaweaheulu and Kameʻeiamoku, the royal counselors of Kamehameha I during his conquest of the Hawaiian Islands from 1780 to 1795. Kameʻeiamoku was one of the royal twins along with Kamanawa depicted flanking the Hawaiian coat of arms, and his son Kepoʻokalani was the first cousin of the conqueror on the side of Kamehameha's mother Kekuʻiapoiwa II. Their family were collateral relations of the House of Kamehameha and ascended to the throne in 1874 upon the election of her uncle Kalākaua as King of the Hawaiian Islands. Her mother was a younger sister to Kalākaua and Liliʻuokalani. Kaʻiulani's father was a Scottish financier from Edinburgh; he served as Collector General of Customs from 1887 to 1893 and as the final Governor of Oahu from 1891 until the office was abolished by the Provisional Government of Hawaii after the 1893 overthrow of the monarchy.

She was christened by Bishop Alfred Willis, at 1:00 p.m. on December 25, 1875, at the Pro-Cathedral of St. Andrew's Anglican Cathedral in Honolulu. This was the first christening of a Hawaiian princess since the birth of Victoria Kamāmalu in 1838. The baby Kaʻiulani, clad in a "cashmere robe, embroidered with silk", was reported to have "behaved with the utmost respect" and did "not utter a sound during the service". Kalākaua, his wife Queen Kapiʻolani, and Princess Ruth Keʻelikōlani, stood as her godparents. A later reference in a 1916 issue of the Honolulu Star-Bulletin stated Hawaiian judge Emma Nakuina was also her godmother. Diplomatic representatives from the United States, Britain and France and members of the consular corps in Honolulu were among the spectators. The royal family held a reception and afternoon dinner at ʻIolani Palace for the guests of the ceremony during which Kaʻiulani was present and attended by her nurse. The Royal Hawaiian Band played at the reception. Captain Henri Berger, the leader of the band, composed the "Kaʻiulani March" in her honor.

Princess Ruth gifted Kaʻiulani with land at Waikiki, 4 miles (6.4 km) from Honolulu, which combined with adjacent lands previously purchased in 1872 by Cleghorn to form ʻĀinahau. (Note: The specific land make up of ʻĀinahau was 6 acres (2.4 ha) purchased by Archibald Cleghorn in 1872, 3.9 acres (1.6 ha) from Princess Ruth in 1875, an additional 1.3 acres (0.53 ha) from Princess Ruth at a later date.) Her mother Likelike named it ʻĀinahau (cool place) (Note: Other sources including Hawaiian linguist Mary Kawena Pukui claimed that the name means "hau tree land" or "land of the hau tree", after the hau trees (Hibiscus tiliaceus) which gave shade to the estate. The confusion is because hau means both cool and the hibiscus tree in Hawaiian.) after the cool winds blowing down from the Manoa Valley. Her father relocated the family to the country estate in 1878 when Kaʻiulani was three years old. Cleghorn planted a large botanical garden on the grounds of the estate, including a banyan tree, known as Kaʻiulani's banyan. Kaʻiulani's mother Princess Likelike died at age 36 on February 2, 1887, officially of unknown causes. Her doctors had believed in vain that she could have been cured with proper nourishment. Upon the death of her mother, when Kaʻiulani was eleven years old, she inherited the estate.

== Education and unrest in Hawaii 1879–1893 ==
From a young age, governesses and private tutors educated Kaʻiulani starting with a British woman, Marion Barnes, from 1879 until her early death of pneumonia in 1884, and then an American woman, Gertrude Gardinier, who became her favorite governess. After Gardinier's marriage in 1887, her governesses included a French woman, Catalina de Alcala or D'Acala, and a German woman, Miss Reiseberg, with whom Kaʻiulani did not develop as strong a bond. Her governesses taught her reading, writing letters (often to relatives), music practices and social training. She also read biographies about her namesake, Queen Victoria. She would become fluent in the Hawaiian, English, French and German languages.

Kalākaua championed future Hawaiian leaders attaining a broader education with his 1880 Hawaiian Youths Abroad program. His niece Kaʻiulani was not the first Hawaiian royal to study abroad. The Hawaiian government sent her cousins (Note: These three brothers were the biological sons of David Kahalepouli Piʻikoi and Victoria Kinoiki Kekaulike, a younger sister of Queen Kapiʻolani. Edward Keliʻiahonui was hānai (informally adopted) by Princess Poʻomaikelani while Kawānanakoa and Kūhiō were hānai by Kalākaua and Kapiʻolani.) David Kawānanakoa (known as Koa), Edward Abnel Keliʻiahonui and Jonah Kūhiō Kalanianaʻole to attend Saint Matthew's Episcopal Day School in the United States in 1885. Keliʻiahonui died young in 1887 while Kawānanakoa and Kūhiō traveled to England in 1890 to finish their education a few months after Kaʻiulani's own departure for an education abroad.

Months after the death of Kaʻiulani's mother, Likelike, political unrest gripped Hawaii. Local businessmen accused Kalākaua's cabinet under Prime Minister Walter Murray Gibson of influence peddling in elections and manipulation of legislative governance. Although the Gibson cabinet was replaced by the Reform Cabinet, the business community remained dissatisfied. The Committee of Thirteen businessmen under the leadership of Lorrin A. Thurston, drafted what became known as the Bayonet Constitution, codifying the legislature as the supreme authority over the monarchy's actions. Thurston is believed to have been the principal author of the new constitution. Presented to Kalākaua for his signature on July 6, 1887, it limited the power of the monarchy and increased the influence of Euro-American interests in the government.

=== Abroad in England, 1889–1893 ===
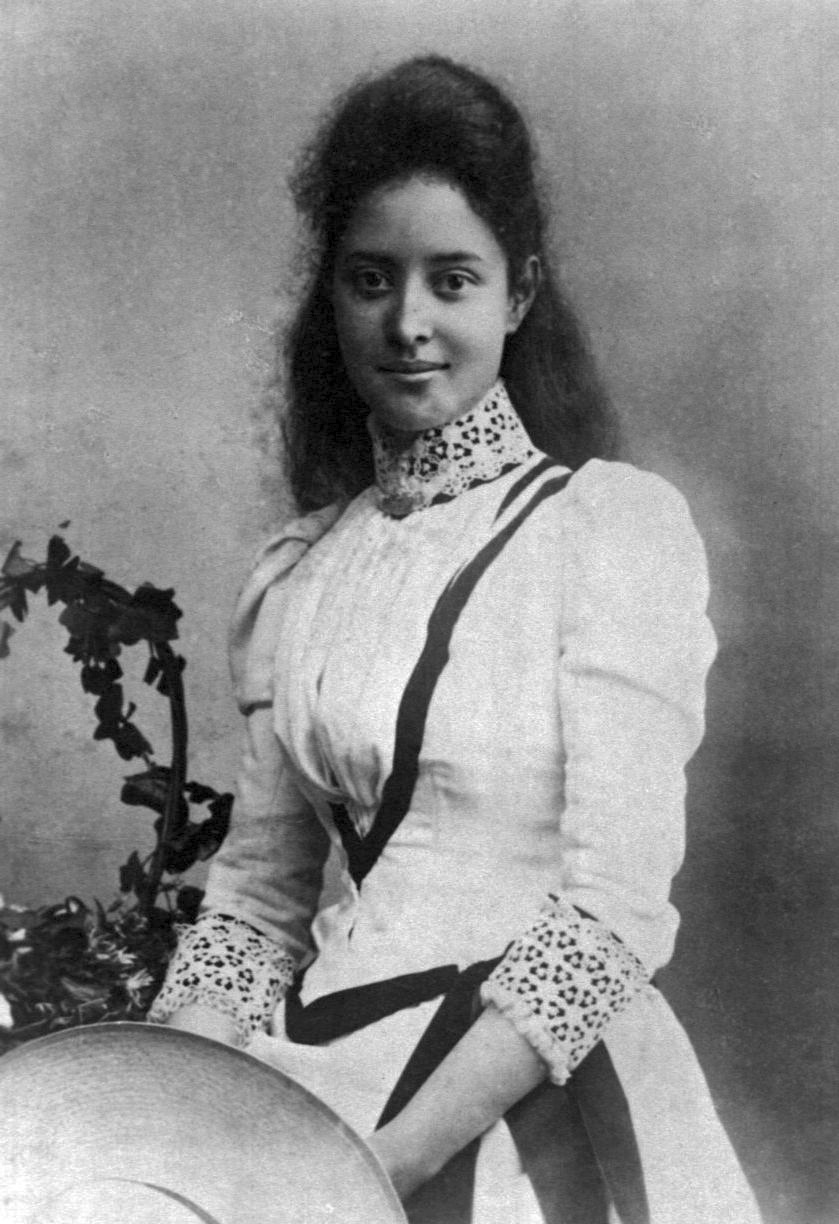
Kaʻiulani at Great Harrowden Hall, c. 1892

Upon the death of her mother, Likelike, Kaʻiulani became second in line to the throne, following her aunt Liliʻuokalani. She would become the heir apparent after the death of her uncle Kalākaua and the accession of Liliʻuokalani. In 1889, it was deemed appropriate to send Kaʻiulani to England for a proper education and remove her from the intrigues and unrest between Kalākaua and his political opponents. Cleghorn, Kalākaua and allegedly Lorrin A. Thurston, who served as Minister of the Interior, made the plans to send Kaʻiulani abroad. Thurston later denied involvement in the decision.

Leaving Honolulu on May 10, 1889, the travel party included her half-sister Annie, and Mary Matilda Walker, wife of the British vice-consul to Hawaii Thomas R. Walker, as their chaperone. Cleghorn accompanied his daughters to San Francisco before returning to Hawaii. They traveled across the United States by train, stopping briefly at Chicago and New York before sailing to England. They landed in Liverpool on June 17, after a month-long journey. After Mrs. Walker returned to Hawaii, Kaʻiulani and Annie were placed under the guardianship of Theo H. Davies and his wife Mary Ellen. Davies was a British citizen and owner of Theo H. Davies & Co., one of the Big Five leading sugar firms operating in Hawaii. During school holidays, Kaʻiulani stayed at Sundown, the Davies' residence in Hesketh Park, Southport.

By September, Kaʻiulani and Annie were sent to Northamptonshire and enrolled at Great Harrowden Hall, a boarding school for young girls, under the elderly schoolmistress Caroline Sharp. After the first academic year, Annie returned to Hawaii to marry leaving Kaʻiulani alone at the school. Sharp noted that Kaʻiulani continued "making good progress in her studies" despite the separation. Kaʻiulani proudly wrote home that she was third in her French class. The Bishop of Leicester confirmed her in the Anglican faith in May 1890. In the summer of 1891, her father visited her, and they toured the British Isles and visited the Cleghorns' ancestral land in Scotland.

Davies persuaded her family to remove Kaʻiulani from Great Harrowden Hall in early 1892 (Note: Historian Marilyn Stassen-McLaughlin claimed that the elderly schoolmistress Caroline Sharp had announced the closure of Great Harrowden Hall around this time.) to attend a finishing school to prepare her for society. By February, Kaʻiulani moved to Hove, Brighton, where she was placed in the care of Phebe Rooke who set up private tutors and a curriculum that included German, French, English, literature, history, music (Note: In relation to her music lessons, Kaʻiulani proudly wrote to her aunt on March 20, 1892. "I have such a nice lady for a singing mistress. She has taught me such a lot, and she says that I have a very sweet soprano voice. I think that I must have inherited it from you. I am getting on pretty well with my music, and I am so fond of it." Her mother Likelike, her aunt Liliʻuokalani and her uncles Kalākaua and Leleiohoku were honored as Na Lani ʻEhā (The Heavenly Four) for their impact, patronage and enrichment of Hawaii's musical culture and history.) and singing. This village by the sea pleased her, and she holidayed in late April and early May at Saint Helier in the Channel Island of Jersey with her host.

The prospect of returning to Hawaii renewed her enthusiasm for her studies. Plans were made for her return to Hawaii by the end of 1893, with the Hawaiian legislature appropriating $4,000 for her travel expenses. This trip would mark her entrance in society as the heir-apparent to the throne. There were arrangements for an audience with Queen Victoria, followed by a tour of Europe and a possible visit to the World's Columbian Exposition in Chicago. In anticipation, Kaʻiulani wrote to her aunt Liliʻuokalani, "I am looking forward to my return next year. I am beginning to feel very homesick." However, following the overthrow on January 17, 1893, these plans were cancelled.

== Overthrow: 1891–1893 ==
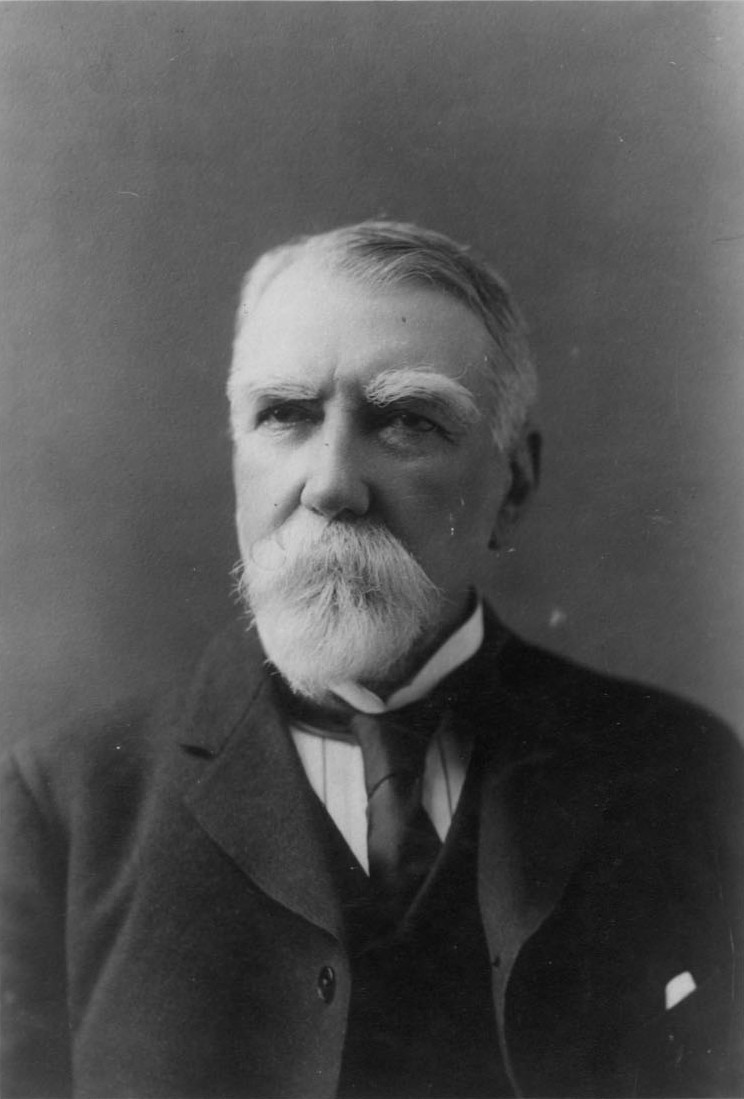
Archibald Scott Cleghorn tried in vain to secure Kaʻiulani's right to the throne during the overthrow.

During her absence, much turmoil occurred back in Hawaii. Kalākaua died in San Francisco on January 20, 1891. Kaʻiulani learned of her uncle's death by the next day through the Transatlantic telegraph cables while news did not reach Hawaii until January 29, when the Charleston returned to Honolulu with the king's remains. Liliʻuokalani ascended immediately to the throne. On March 9, with the approval of the House of Nobles, and as required by the Hawaiian constitution, Liliʻuokalani appointed her niece Kaʻiulani as her heir apparent and eventual successor to the throne. The Queen's staff then rode through the streets of Honolulu announcing the proclamation, while gun salutes were fired from both the artillery battery and the American vessels Mohican and Iroquois in Honolulu Harbor.

As heir apparent, Kaʻiulani had influence with the queen on political issues. In the fall of 1891, she wrote to Liliʻuokalani requesting the appointment of her father, instead of Prince David Kawānanakoa, (Note: Kalākaua granted the title of Prince to both Kawānanakoa and his brothers Edward Abnel Keliʻiahonui and Jonah Kūhiō Kalanianaʻole, on February 10, 1883.) to the recently vacated governorship of Oahu caused by the death of Liliʻuokalani's husband John Owen Dominis. The queen acceded to her request, and made the appointment of Cleghorn on November 11. The princess also received approval for her father to retain his post as collector general after she explained, "we cannot do without his salary for that, as the salary of Governor is only half the other." Kaʻiulani, looking forward to her return, promised, "When I come home I shall try to help you as much as I can, tho [sic] it will not be much as I don't understand State Affairs."

The Committee of Safety, under the leadership of Thurston, met for two days in the final planning of the overthrow, and unanimously selected Sanford B. Dole to lead the coup and organize a provisional government. Dole put forth what he believed was a more reasonable immediate plan of action, a possible outcome that had been discussed by others in the kingdom, "...that the Queen be deposed and Princess Kaʻiulani be installed as queen, and that a regency be established to govern the country during her minority..." (Note: Sanford B. Dole recounted his initial meeting with the Committee of Safety in the evening of January 16, 1893, in his memoir: I found the meeting unanimously in favor of setting aside the monarchy and establishing a republican form of government with the view of eventual annexation to the United States. I suggested, instead of such a scheme, that the Queen be deposed and Princess Kaiulani be installed as queen, and that a regency be established to govern the country during her minority, but I was informed very positively that the supporters of the movement were unanimous in the feeling that no more trial should be accorded to the Kalakaua family or any of its members, and that such a scheme would receive no support and was wholly impracticable. After some further discussion, I told them that I would consider their proposition overnight, and give my decision in the morning to the executive committee, which had been created by the Committee of Safety.) In fact, Cleghorn had also directly approached Thurston the morning before the overthrow, with the exact same proposition. Thurston reiterated what he had already told Cleghorn, that the committee had no interest in dealing with a future monarchy in any form, and rejected the plan outright. (Note: Lorrin A. Thurston recounted his meeting with Archibald Scott Cleghorn in the morning of January 16, 1893, writing in his memoir: Shortly after Mr. Wilson's departure, another knock came at the door; opening it, I found Mr. Archibald Cleghorn. He was the brother-in-law of Queen Liliuokalani, the husband of the Queen's sister, Likelike, and father of Princess Kaiulani. The old gentleman said: "I would like to speak to you a few minutes, Mr. Thurston;" and drew me into the hall. There he went on: "I do not blame you for what you are proposing to do to Liliuokalani, Mr. Thurston, but I wish to submit, for the consideration of the committee of safety, whether it is necessary to overturn the Monarchy entirely, and to have you take into consideration the claim of Princess Kaiulani. If you remove Liliuokalani from the throne, why not appoint, who is now the heir apparent, to be queen? You can appoint a board of regents to act during her minority, and I assure you that the community will have a very different state of affairs to deal with from that which Kalakaua and Liliuokalani have presented." "You know my regard for Kaiulani, Mr. Cleghorn, " I replied. "I think very highly of her. If conditions were different, I should be very glad to help promote your suggestion; but matters have proceeded too far for your plan to be an adequate answer to this situation. We are going to abrogate the Monarchy entirely, and nothing can be done to stop us, so far as I can see! " Mr. Cleghorn looked as though he were about to weep. He bowed his head in silence, and retreated down the stairway. I returned to the office and informed the committee of my interviews with Messrs . Wilson and Cleghorn; and the committee approved both of my replies.) The monarchy was overthrown and the Provisional Government of Hawaii was proclaimed by President Sanford B. Dole on January 17, 1893.

Liliʻuokalani relinquished her power to the United States temporarily, rather than the Dole-led government, in hopes that the United States would recognize the monarchical government as the lawful power, and thereby restore Hawaii's sovereignty. Cleghorn lost his governorship position as of February 28. He blamed Liliʻuokalani's political inaction for the overthrow and believed that the monarchy would have been preserved had she abdicated in favor of Kaʻiulani. He met privately with Thurston and requested that he respect Ka'iulani's claim to the throne, which Thurston tersely refused to consider. Cleghorn later took an oath to the Provisional Government under protest in order to retain his position in the custom house, but resigned on April 15.

The Provisional Government's ultimate goal was annexation by the United States. Thurston headed a delegation to Washington, D.C., to negotiate with President Benjamin Harrison, while the queen sent her attorney Paul Neumann and Prince Kawānanakoa to represent her case to Harrison and President-elect Grover Cleveland. Cleghorn paid for the travel expenses of Edward C. Macfarlane, another of the queen's envoys, to protect the rights of Kaʻiulani. The annexation treaty would have offered Liliʻuokalani a lifetime pension of $20,000 annually, and compensated Kaʻiulani with a one-time settlement of $150,000, if they would subordinate themselves to the United States government, and to local governance of the Islands. The queen never saw that as a viable option.

=== Visit to the United States: 1893 ===
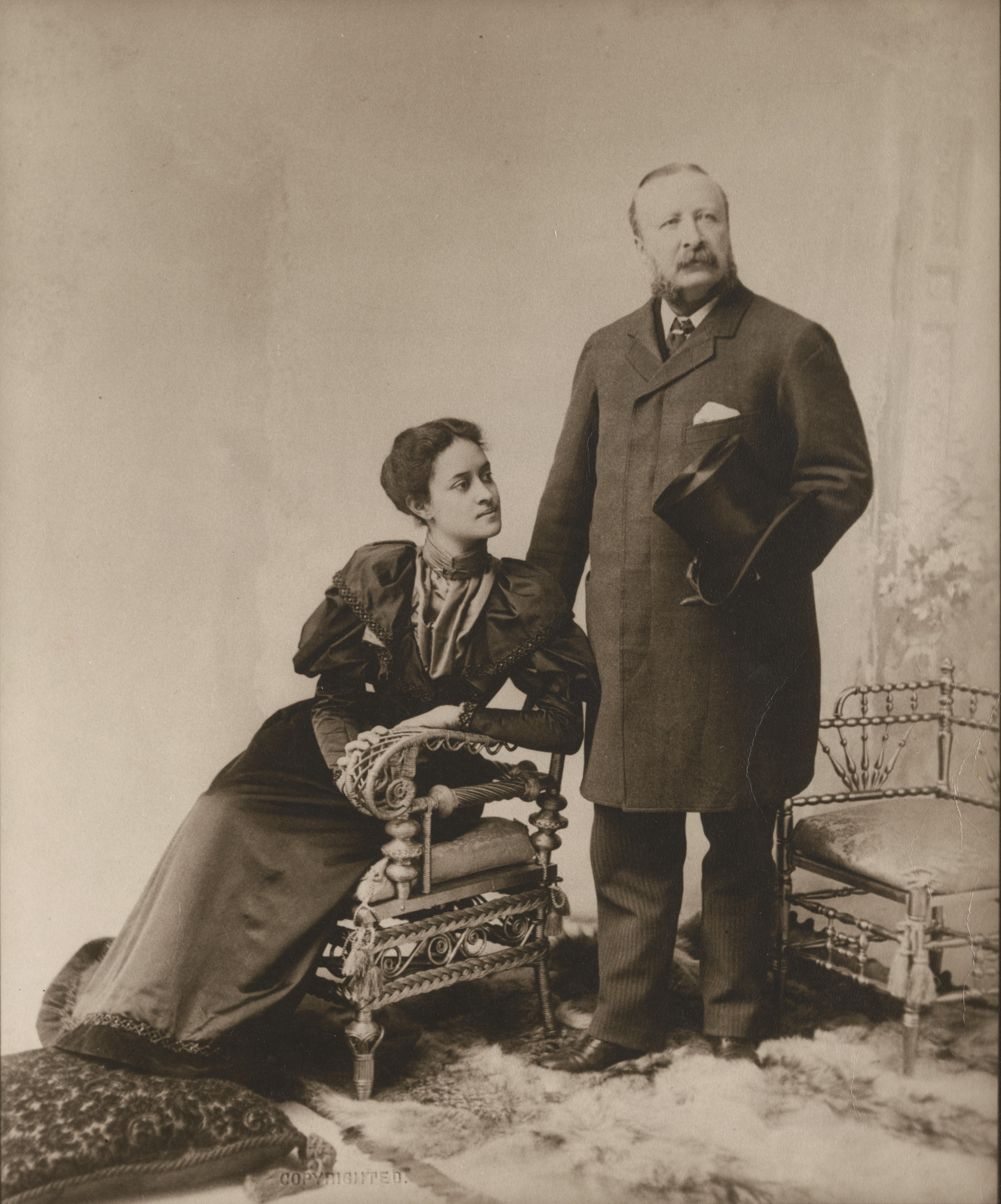
Kaʻiulani and Theo H. Davies in Boston, 1893

Many factions in Hawaii and abroad preferred restoring Kaʻiulani to the Hawaiian throne in place of Liliʻuokalani under a more restricted form of constitutional monarchy. James Hay Wodehouse, the British commissioner to Hawaii, reported to his superior in London that the natives would support and welcome Kaʻiulani as queen. Charles Reed Bishop, the widower of the High Chiefess Bernice Pauahi Bishop, wrote that, "the better class of the British prefer her, and they would help to control her and make as good a government as possible". Dole, the leader of the Provisional Government, had stated that it would have been "far more tactful" to "hold the power of the throne" through a "regency in the name of the young Princess Kaʻiulani until she reaches her majority".

Kaʻiulani learned of the overthrow via a short telegram received by Davies on January 30, "'Queen Deposed', 'Monarchy Abrogated', 'Break News to Princess'". In the weeks after the overthrow, Davies wrote to the Hawaiian Minister to the United States John Mott-Smith in Washington suggesting that the Hawaiian electorate vote on a revised constitution for the abdication of the queen and for the placing Kaʻiulani under a council of regency headed by Dole. Davies reiterated this stance in a later address. Davies advised Kaʻiulani to take her case directly to the American people.

Kaʻiulani, accompanied by Mr. and Mrs. Davies, their daughter Alice Davies, Annie Whartoff, as her lady-in-waiting and a chaperone, and a maid of Mrs. Davies, traveled from Southampton to New York, arriving on March 1. Macfarlane and Mott-Smith met the party on their ship. Upon landing on the pier, Kaʻiulani delivered to the assembled press and curious onlookers a speech written by Davies:

Seventy years ago, Christian America sent over Christian men and women to give religion and civilization to Hawaii. Today, three of the sons of those missionaries are at your capitol asking you to undo their father's work. Who sent them? Who gave them the authority to break the Constitution which they swore they would uphold? Today, I, a poor weak girl with not one of my people with me and all these 'Hawaiian' statesmen against me, have strength to stand up for the rights of my people. Even now I can hear their wail in my heart and it gives me strength and courage and I am strong – strong in the faith of God, strong in the knowledge that I am right, strong in the strength of seventy million people who in this free land will hear my cry and will refuse to let their flag cover dishonor to mine!"

During her first two days, Kaʻiulani and the Davieses toured New York and received callers, including her cousin Kawānanakoa, although he was only allowed to speak to her briefly. Dissent developed between Davies and Liliʻuokalani's representatives in the United States over his influence over Kaʻiulani. Kawānanakoa along with Neumann, Macfarlane and Mott-Smith voiced criticism at Davies' action in bringing Kaʻiulani to the United States without the consent of Cleghorn or the queen. They felt Davies' public statements supporting a regency in place of the queen undermined the cause against annexation and created the impression of a "three-cornered fight". Macfarlane, himself of British descent, stated to the press, "Her coming will do no good, especially when she is under the wing of an ultra-Britisher."

From March 3 to March 7, Kaʻiulani visited Boston while Cleveland waited to be sworn in as President. She attended various social events, many in her honor, and toured the Massachusetts Institute of Technology (where the Davies' son Clive attended) and Wellesley College. Arriving in Washington, D.C., on March 8, Kawānanakoa greeted her at the train station with a floral lei. She stayed at Arlington Hotel where she awaited the chance to meet with the President. In the meantime, Cleveland, who espoused anti-imperialist views, withdrew the treaty of annexation on March 9 and appointed James Henderson Blount on March 11 as special commissioner to investigate the overthrow. On March 13, President and First Lady Frances Cleveland received Kaʻiulani at the White House. Her traveling companion Alice recalled, "We were received by President and Mrs. Cleveland and we had a short interview where all references to our mission were carefully avoided."

Politics remained uncertain as Hawaii waited for the conclusion of the Blount Report. Macfarlane wanted Kaʻiulani to return to Honolulu while Davies wanted her to accompany him back to England. Macfarlane believed that going back narrowed her perspective in favor of the British, which might affect her policy making should she become queen. On April 8, Cleghorn wrote to Kaʻiulani, "I think for the present you are better not here, much as I would like to have you home. ... [T]hings must be settled soon and then we will know what to do."

== Establishing life in Europe: 1893–1897 ==
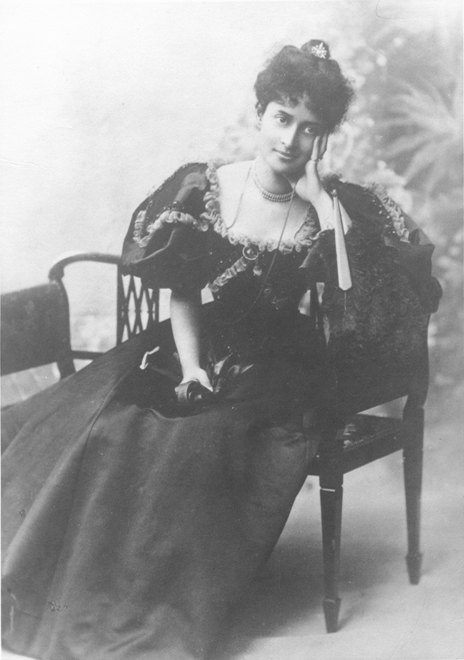
Kaʻiulani on the Isle of Jersey, c. 1896–1897

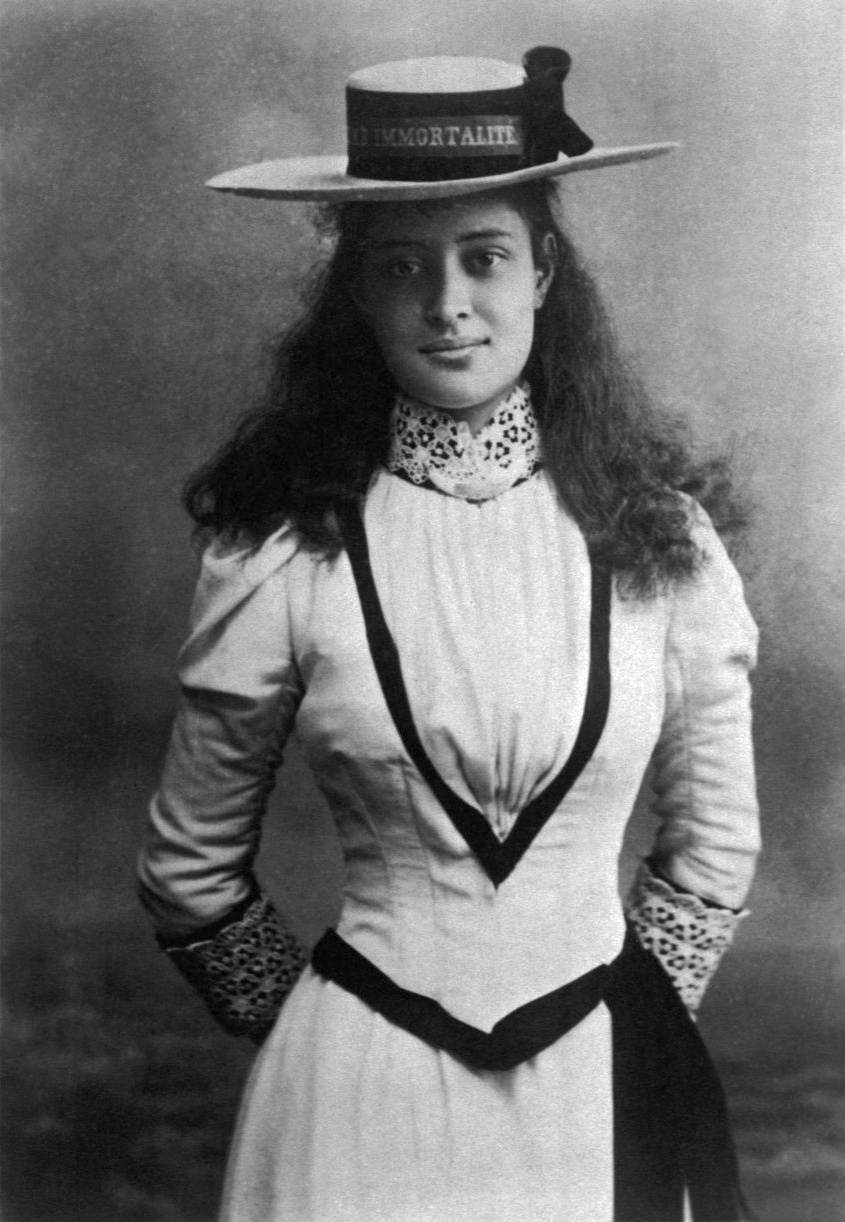
Kaʻiulani in London, c. 1893–1895

Prior to the 1893 overthrow, Kaʻiulani had been allocated an annual pension by the Hawaiian government. As a member of the royal family, she had received $5,000 annually from the civil list between 1882 and 1888, $4,800 between 1888 and 1892 and $10,000 as heir apparent to the throne in 1892. Archibald Cleghorn had also been supported from the Hawaiian civil list through his governmental positions. These sources of income ended after the overthrow.

The unsettled political situation in Hawaii prevented Kaʻiulani from returning home, and her father arranged for her to remain with the Davies family in England. The press releases under her name were in reality created by Davies who, in the beginning, did not ask for her input. It is unclear whether any of the public statements were at her request, but he did eventually give her the opportunity to approve the final product before it went to the news media of the day. The teenage Kaʻiulani spent her summer of 1893 with the Davies family in Killiney, Ireland, where she and her friends played cricket and enjoyed tea.

That winter, Mary Ellen Davies sent her daughter Alice to Wiesbaden, Germany, with Kaʻiulani, and three other women of the same age. Traveling with a chaperone, they were primarily there to learn the German language. Alice later said, " .. I forget just about everything about that journey except that she made many conquests among the susceptible German officers we met." Family friend Lillian Kennedy remembered a very fun-loving young lady who engaged in pillow fights and played hide-and-seek games. Politics in Hawaii began to seem far away and less important to her. She was beginning to enjoy life abroad, so much so that she resisted returning to the Davies' home to once again become a political asset.

Accustomed to the life of a Victorian society woman, Kaʻiulani preferred her new life. Writing to her father on June 10, 1894, she expressed her sadness at the change in Hawaii and asked him to consider a life abroad in Europe. After the 1895 royalist counter-revolution, he agreed. While they were abroad, the news of the March 6, 1897, death of her half-sister Annie impacted both Kaʻiulani and Cleghorn. From August 1895 to October 1897, she and her father assumed the lives of itinerant aristocrats traveling across Europe and the British Isles. They stayed in the French Riviera, Paris, and on the island of Jersey, as well as England, and Scotland. Kaʻiulani was treated as royalty in the French Riviera where they wintered each year and made friends, including Nevinson William (Toby) de Courcy, a British aristocrat who corresponded with her over the next three years and saved her letters until his death.

During these years, Kaʻiulani began to have recurring illnesses, writing her aunt Liliʻuokalani that she'd had "the grip" (influenza) seven times while living abroad. She also complained of headaches, weight loss, eye problems and fainting spells. A migraine episode in Paris on May 4, 1897, prevented her from attending the Bazar de la Charité, which caught fire and killed a number of French noble women including the Duchess of Alençon. Growing expenses also exacerbated Cleghorn's drained financial status, and he wrote to Liliʻuokalani, asking for assistance.

Kaʻiulani knew little about financial management and had no means to repay her benefactors. As her funding ran out, she wondered if the Provisional Government would give her an allowance. Her father had no means to support her, so both were dependent upon the generosity of others. Davies was a hard-nosed businessman who had risen from working-class parents, to make a fortune in Hawaii's sugar plantation business. While he agreed to assist with the finances, he took the princess to task for her careless spending in 1894, "I am disappointed in what you say about money matters because I have always been disagreeably plain about them ... You have the chance to be a heroine but unless you exercise resolution and self control ... we shall all fail". He cautioned that any funding from the Provisional Government obligated her to support their cause. He tried to get Kaʻiulani to re-focus on the goal ahead regarding Hawaii, but she wanted to be in charge of her own destiny. Stress from her financial situation had an adverse effect on her mental and physical health, and she fell into an emotional drift.

== Return to Hawaii: 1897 ==
Kaʻiulani felt duty-bound to her family in Hawaii, especially her ailing aunt, the Dowager Queen Kapiʻolani. However, the princess was wary of her uncertain future as a former royal and was reluctant to accept the prospect of an arranged marriage back home. She was also growing accustomed to life abroad. Despite her misgivings, the changing political situation in Hawaii called her home in 1897. On June 16, Cleveland's successor President William McKinley presented the United States Senate with a new version of the annexation treaty to incorporate the Republic of Hawaii into the United States. Liliʻuokalani filed an official protest with Secretary of State John Sherman. Hawaiians against annexation coalesced, including the political entity Hui Kālaiʻāina which ran petition drives to oppose annexation.

Between 1896 and 1897, she divulged her plans to return to Hawaii in two candid letters written to her friend Toby de Courcy. In the first letter, written in the fall of 1896 from Rozel, Jersey, she confided in him that a secret engagement was arranged and she was expected to return in April of the following year. In a subsequent letter dated July 4 from Tunbridge Wells, she explained to Toby that she would visit her aunt Liliʻuokalani in the United States. The decision to return to Hawaii was still undecided at this point. Kaʻiulani added that, "If I went over to see my Aunt I would only stay about Three [sic] weeks there and return again here (Europe)", although Davies "may think it advisable for me to return home the end of this winter". By August and September, Kaʻiulani and her father were making farewell calls to friends, hiring an Irish maid, Mary O'Donell, to assist her and preparing for their return to Hawaii.

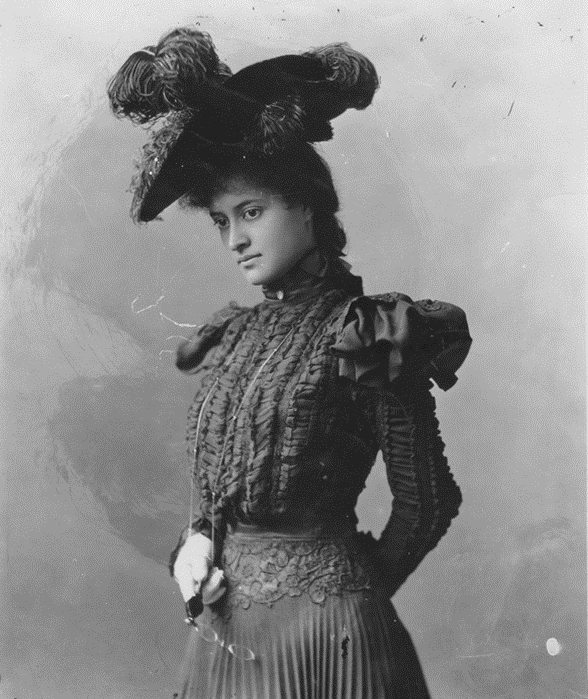
Kaʻiulani in San Francisco on her way home to Hawaii, 1897

Kaʻiulani and her father Cleghorn sailed from Southampton to New York on October 9, 1897. After a brief stay at the Albemarle Hotel in New York, the two traveled to Washington, D.C., to pay their respects to Queen Liliʻuokalani, who was staying at Ebbett House in the U.S. capital to lobby against annexation. Afterward, Kaʻiulani and Cleghorn took a train heading west and reached San Francisco on October 29 where they stayed at the Occidental Hotel. During her travels across the United States, many journalists interviewed her, although her father made sure to shield her from topics of politics. Many detractors of the monarchy had painted a negative image of Hawaiians, especially of Kaʻiulani and her aunt Liliʻuokalani. However, interviews with the Hawaiian princess dispelled these rumors. A journalist of San Francisco's The Examiner wrote, "A barbarian princess? Not a bit of it ..Rather the very flower — an exotic — of civilization. The Princess Kaʻiulani is a charming, fascinating individual." According to historian Andrea Feeser, the contemporary portrayals of Kaʻiulani were "shaped by race and gender stereotypes, and although they aimed to be favorable, they granted her no authority" with emphasis placed on her Caucasian features, Victorian manners, feminine fragility and exoticism.

Kaʻiulani and her father sailed from San Francisco on November 2 and arrived in Honolulu on the morning of November 9. Thousands of well-wishers, including her cousin Kawānanakoa, greeted her at the harbor in Honolulu and showered her with garlands of lei and flowers. They returned to ʻĀinahau where Kaʻiulani was to assume the life of a private citizen. Her father had built a two-storied new Victorian-style mansion designed by architect Clinton Briggs Ripley next to the bungalow which had been her childhood home in the intervening years when she was abroad. Despite her lack of political status, she continued to receive visitors and made public appearances at events hosted by both monarchists and supporters of the Republic.

The Hawaiian Red Cross Society was formed in June 1898, with Mrs. Harold M. Sewall as its president. Her husband was the United States Minister to the Republic. First Lady of the Republic Anna Prentice Cate Dole was selected as first vice-president, and Kaʻiulani was second vice-president. It is unclear if the princess had given her consent to be named as part of the committee, but she did not attend the subsequent meeting of the officers.

In the United States Senate, McKinley's annexation treaty failed to pass after months without a vote. However, following the outbreak of the Spanish–American War, Hawaii was annexed in any event via the Newlands Resolution, a joint resolution of Congress, on July 4, 1898. With the impending annexation of Hawaii only weeks away and Liliʻuokalani still in Washington, D.C., Hawaii wanted to show its support of U.S. troops heading to the Pacific theater of the war. If nothing else, the harbor traffic meant income for the local businesses. Cleghorn and Kaʻiulani issued an open invitation for visiting American troops to stay at ʻĀinahau, although it was more likely solely her father's idea. She wrote to Liliʻuokalani, "I am sure you would be disgusted if you could see the way the town is decorated for the American troops. Honolulu is making a fool of itself and I only hope we won't be ridiculed."

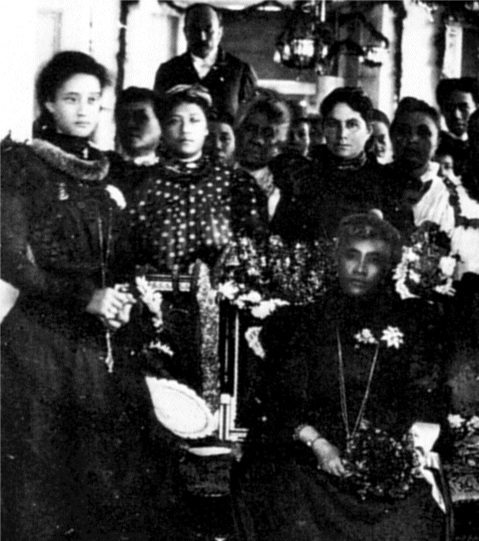
Kaʻiulani and Liliʻuokalani at Washington Place, boycotting the annexation ceremony, 1898

The annexation ceremony was held on August 12, 1898, at the former ʻIolani Palace, now being used as the executive building of the government. President Dole handed over "the sovereignty and public property of the Hawaiian Islands" to United States minister Harold M. Sewall. The flag of the Republic of Hawaii was lowered, and the flag of the United States was raised in its place. "When the news of Annexation came it was bitterer than death to me," Kaʻiulani told the San Francisco Chronicle. "It was bad enough to lose the throne, but infinitely worse to have the flag go down ...". Liliʻuokalani with Kaʻiulani, their family members and retainers boycotted the event and shuttered themselves away at Washington Place in mourning. Many Native Hawaiians and royalists followed suit and refused to attend the ceremony. The Republican government attempted to invite her to the Annexation Ball, and she responded by saying, "Why don't you ask me if I am going to pull down Hawaii's flag for them?"

On September 7, 1898, Kaʻiulani hosted the United States Congressional commission party and more than 120 guests with a grand luau at ʻĀinahau. The commissioners: the new Territorial Governor Dole, Senators Shelby M. Cullom of Illinois and John T. Morgan of Alabama, Representative Robert R. Hitt of Illinois, and Hawaii associate justice and the later Territorial Governor Walter F. Frear were tasked with forming a new territorial government. Kaʻiulani arranged the event to highlight the importance of Hawaiian culture and started the luau by dipping her finger in the poi. The luau at ʻĀinahau for the congressional party was portrayed in the 2009 film as a fight for Hawaiian suffrage, which was ensured in the 1900 Hawaiian Organic Act.

== Personal life ==
=== Surfing ===
Kaʻiulani had always been an athletic young woman, who enjoyed equestrianism, surfing, swimming, croquet, and canoeing. In an 1897 interview for The Sun newspaper in New York, she stated, "I love riding, driving, swimming, dancing and cycling. Really, I'm sure I was a seal in another world because I am so fond of the water… My mother taught me to swim almost before I knew how to walk." An avid surfer on the shores of Waikiki, her 7 feet 4 inches (2.24 m) alaia surfboard made of koa (acacia koa) is preserved at the Bernice Pauahi Bishop Museum. Acquired by the museum in 1922 from her deceased father’s estate, it is one of the few surviving examples of 19th-century Hawaiian surfboards.

According to popular belief, she may have been the first female surfer in the British Isles. However, the Museum of British Surfing states "the only tangible evidence – so far – is a letter in which she wrote that she enjoyed ‘being on the water again’ at Brighton." Her three cousins Kawananakoa, Kuhio and Keliʻiahonui pioneered surfing in California in 1885. Kawananakoa and Kūhiō became the first male surfers in the British Isles in 1890 when they went surf riding with their tutor John Wrightson at Bridlington in northern England. The swimming attire for Victorian-minded Hawaiian royals would have been full-body swimwear made of wool or cotton.

=== Robert Louis Stevenson ===
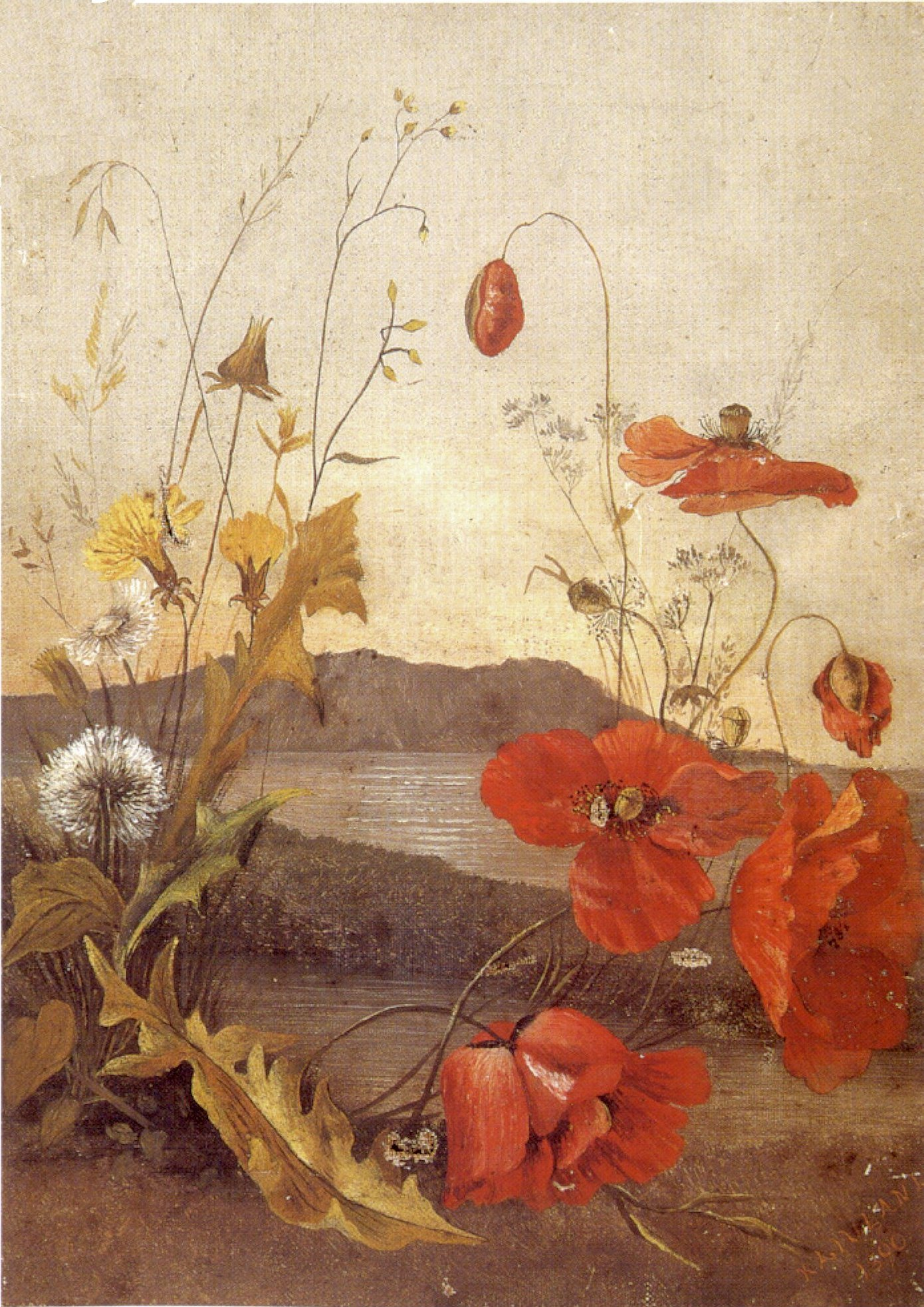
Poppies, oil on canvas painting by Kaʻiulani, 1890

Kaʻiulani was a painter who enjoyed the company of other artists. While under Davies' guardianship, she sent some of her paintings of England home to Hawaii. When Kalakaua was ill in his final year, she sent a painting to cheer him up. Her few surviving paintings are found in Hawaii. She was acquainted with Joseph Dwight Strong, a landscape painter in the court of Kalākaua, and Isobel Osbourne Strong, a lady-in-waiting to Likelike. Isobel's stepfather was Scottish writer Robert Louis Stevenson. In June 1888, Stevenson chartered the yacht Casco and set sail with his family from San Francisco. The poet spent nearly three years in the eastern and central Pacific, stopping for extended stays at the Hawaiian Islands, where he became a good friend of King Kalākaua and Ka'iulani. Stevenson and the princess often strolled at ʻĀinahau and sat beneath its banyan tree. Prior to her departure, Stevenson composed a poem for her. He later wrote to his friend Will Hicok Low, "If you want to cease to be Republican, see my little Kaiulani, as she goes through [the United States]." Historian A. Grove Day noted, "Of all his island friendships, the platonic affair with the half-Scottish princess has most persisted in the imagination of lovers of Hawaiiana."

Forth from her land to mine she goes,
The island maid, the island rose,
Light of heart and bright of face,
The daughter of a double race ...
But our Scots islands far away
Shall glitter with unwonted day,
And cast for once their tempest by
To smile in Kaiulani's eye.

— Robert Louis Stevenson, 1889, Ka'iulani, Webb & Webb 1998, p. 69

=== Matchmaking and engagement rumors ===
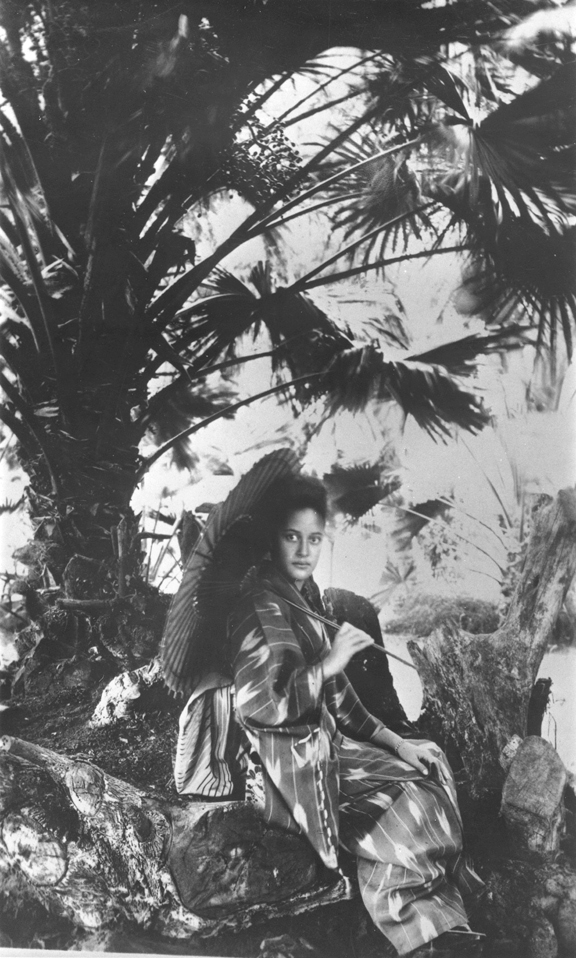
Kaʻiulani wearing a traditional Japanese kimono

During his 1881 world tour, Kalākaua held a secret meeting with Emperor Meiji and proposed to unite the two nations in an alliance with an arranged marriage between his 5-year-old niece Kaʻiulani and the 13-year-old Prince Yamashina Sadamaro. (Note: Also known as Prince Fushimi Sadamaro, Prince Komatsu or finally Prince Higashifushimi Yorihito due to his various adoption into different ōke cadet branches of the Japanese imperial house.) From extant letters to the king, both by Prince Sadamaro, upon the advice of his adoptive father, and by Japanese foreign minister Inoue Kaoru declined the proposal on behalf of the government of Japan. In February 1893, the Japanese Imperial Navy gunboat Naniwa was docked at Pearl Harbor with the Japanese prince on board. Rumors circulated in the American press that the Japanese considered intervening militarily.

From 1893 until her death, rumors of whom Kaʻiulani would wed circulated in the American and Hawaiian press, and on one occasion she was pressured by Queen Liliʻuokalani to marry. When Clive Davies, son of Kaʻiulani's guardian Theo H. Davies, was a student at Massachusetts Institute of Technology in 1893, he was rumored to be Kaʻiulani's fiancé. Although the princess had stayed with the family occasionally while she was in England, her father said there was no engagement between the two young people and the rumors were "absurd and preposterous". In spite of the denial, the rumors persisted for a time. However, Clive was engaged to Edith Fox, daughter of civil engineer Francis Fox, between 1896 and 1898 while he resided in Honolulu and handled his father's business. Another rumor, which circulated after Kaʻiulani's return to Hawaii, said she was to marry Clive's brother George Davies. Members of Kaʻiulani's household denied this.

On January 29, 1894, when Kaʻiulani was nineteen, Liliʻuokalani wrote asking her to consider marrying either Prince David Kawānanakoa, Prince Jonah Kūhiō Kalanianaʻole, or an unnamed Japanese prince (then studying in London). She reminded her, "To you then depends the hope of the Nation and unfortunately we cannot always do as we like." It took five months for Kaʻiulani to respond to Liliʻuokalani's suggestion. In a June 22, 1894, letter Kaʻiulani asserted that she would prefer to marry for love unless it was necessary stating, "I feel it would be wrong if I married a man I did not love." Based on personal letters and letters by her friends, many suitors courted Kaʻiulani while she resided in England and Europe. Prior to her return to Hawaii in November 1897, Kaʻiulani confided in her friend Toby de Courcy that she would have to end her courtship with one of her "young men" because there was an arranged marriage waiting for her in Hawaii. She further hinted that the union, approved by her father and Theo H. Davies, was being kept secret for political reasons. She lamented, "I must have been born under an unlucky star as I seem to have my life planned out for me in such a way that I cannot alter it." Historian Marilyn Stassen-McLaughlin and biographer Sharon Linnea could not identify the gentleman behind the secret union from the primary sources, but conjectured it was Kawānanakoa because he was the only likely candidate for a political union after Kūhiō had married in 1896.

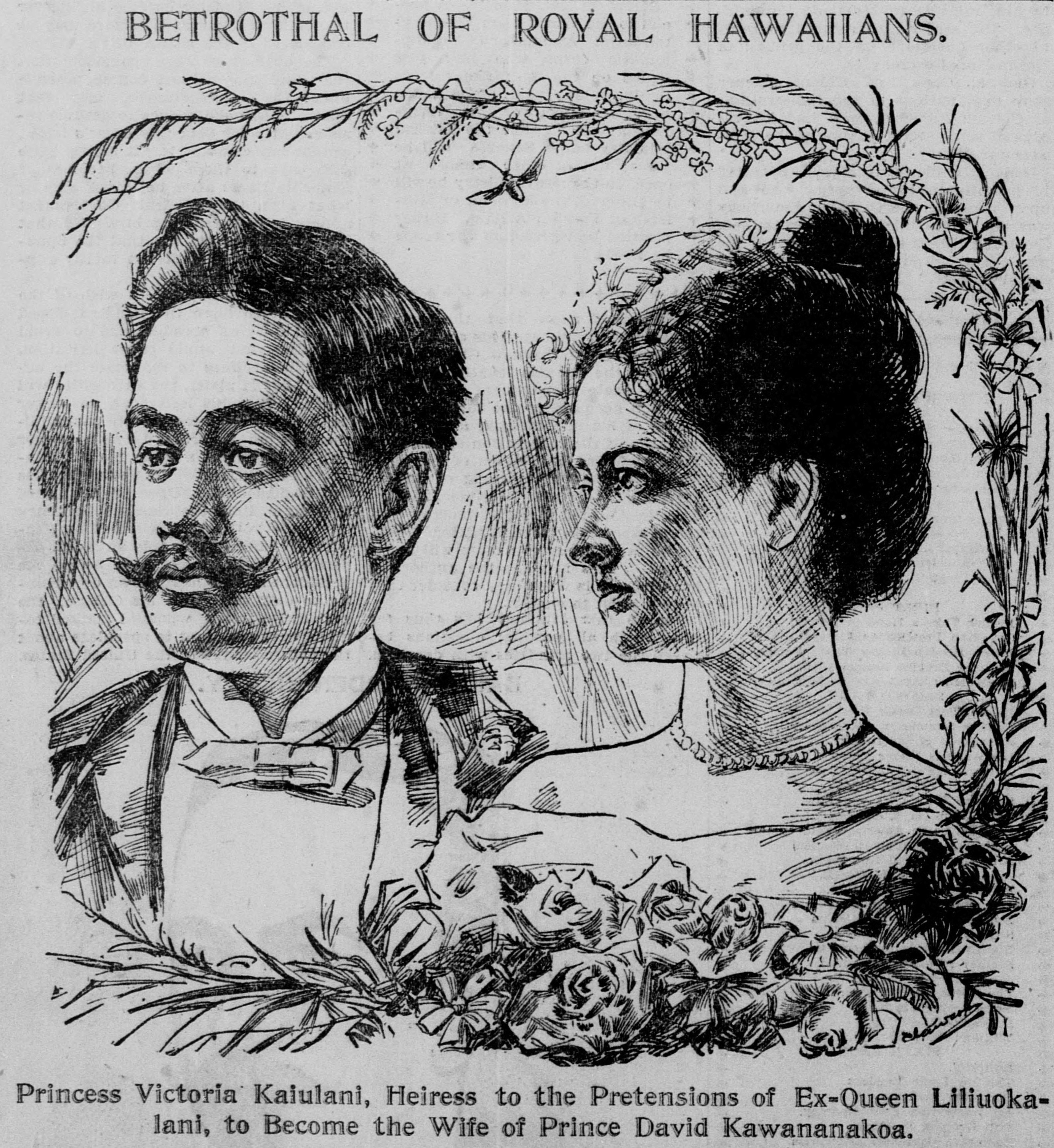
"Betrothal of Royal Hawaiians", published in The San Francisco Call, 1898

Records indicate that there may have been a written agreement of betrothal with Kawānanakoa, that was quickly aborted. An unsubstantiated announcement dated February 3, 1898, was printed in The San Francisco Call and later reprinted in newspapers across the United States. According to the report, the betrothal was dependent upon the finalization of deeds to a sizeable real estate holding, transferred from Queen Kapiʻolani to both Kawānanakoa and Kalanianaʻole. On February 19, a denial of betrothal from Kawānanakoa was printed in the newspapers. Kapiʻolani did deed all her property, real and personal, to the brothers on February 10, with the express stipulation that the documentation not be executed until she was ready. Kapiʻolani wanted to hold off the transfer until she was too old to manage the property herself, and/or otherwise would believe she was close to death. She last saw the document with her notary Carlos A. Long, with her instructions to have changes made in the wording. Instead, the brothers had the deed executed immediately, without her knowledge. (Note: The personal writings of Curtis P. Iaukea, a royal courtier who served as chamberlain to King Kalākaua and later secretary to Queen Liliʻuokalani, notes: "On arriving at New York on our way home from the Jubilee, where I got the Honolulu papers, staring me in the face was the news that the Queen had deeded her property to her two Nephews, with some reservation for the payment of her outstanding liabilites [sic]. Curious to know what led the Queen to dispense with her estate in the way she did, I learned from one of the parties concerned in the transaction, whom I knew well and intimately, that in her anxiety that the older of the two Boys, David Kawananakoa, should marry Princess Kaʻiulani, a union that she had set her heart on, she executed the deed as a means of overcoming the reflection and representations made to her, that unless she did so, Kaʻiulani would not entertain or consent to marry David as he had no visible means of supporting a wife. That Princess Kaʻiulani ever entertained this proposition, I doubt. At all events, the union did not materialize, much to the Queen's disappointment. She then tried to recover the property, but proved unavailing. She died not long after.")

Family lore also conflicts over the exact nature of her relationship with Kawānanakoa. Kaʻiulani's niece Mabel Robertson Lucas (daughter of her sister Rose) said that the two cousins were close but only like siblings. Nancy and Jean Francis Webb's 1962 biography of Kaʻiulani says that Kawānanakoa's eventual wife, Abigail Campbell Kawānanakoa, told an unnamed biographer or close friend that "of course I never could have married David if Kaʻiulani had lived". The Bishop Museum collection has a number of jewels owned by Kaʻiulani, including a diamond and aquamarine necklace given to her by Queen Kapiʻolani in 1897, in honor of her engagement to an unnamed suitor. Kaʻiulani replaced the chain attaching the gems with strands of small pearls.

According to a letter written to Liliʻuokalani dated to June 22, 1894, in which she declined the idea of an arranged marriage, she mentioned that she had rejected a proposal by an "enormously rich German Count". She was connected in the press to two other suitors in 1898: Captain Putnam Bradlee Strong, an American officer en route to fight in the Spanish–American War in Manila and son of New York City Mayor William Lafayette Strong, and Andrew Adams, a New England-born journalist for The Pacific Commercial Advertiser whom her father favored. In 1895, The Evening Republican reported a rumor that Kaʻiulani was to marry Rudolph Spreckels, the son of sugar magnate Claus Spreckels. A posthumous report in The Butte Daily Post, after Kaʻiulani's death, connected her to James G. Blaine, Jr, son of former United States Secretary of State James G. Blaine.

== Illness, death, and burial: 1898–1899 ==
Kaʻiulani traveled to the Parker Ranch at Waimea, on the island of Hawaii on December 6, 1898. The ranch owner, Samuel Parker, had served on Kalākaua's privy council, and was Liliʻuokalani's minister of foreign affairs when the monarchy was overthrown. Kaʻiulani attended the December 14 wedding of Parker's daughter, who was her childhood friend Eva, to Frank Woods, and stayed for Christmas festivities. The celebrations and activities went on for weeks. In mid-January 1899, Kaʻiulani and a number of other guests mounted horses and rode out for a picnic. What started out as pleasant weather soon turned into a windy rainstorm. While others on the ride donned raincoats, Kaʻiulani was gleefully galloping through the rain without a coat. It was not until later, when they were back on the ranch, that she began feeling ill. Upon learning of her situation on January 24, her father sailed immediately to the island on the steamship Kinau. Their family physician, "Doctor Walters" (Saint David G. Walters), accompanied him. After medical treatment, the public was told two weeks later that she was on the mend.

However, Kaʻiulani was still frail, and her illness lingered. A petition to President William McKinley and Congress, urging the United States to grant the princess a pension, was being circulated for signatures. In reality, she was still gravely ill, and Cleghorn brought her back to ʻĀinahau on February 9, on the steamship Mauna Loa. She was so ill she had to be carried on a stretcher. Walters said it was "inflammatory rheumatism". He later added that she also had an exophthalmic goitre.

Kaʻiulani died of inflammatory rheumatism, at her home at ʻĀinahau, on Monday, March 6, 1899, at the age of 23. Later, George W. Macfarlane, a family friend and King Kalākaua's chamberlain, told a reporter from the San Francisco Call that the princess possibly died of a broken heart. Kaʻiulani had loved peacocks, growing up around a flock originally belonging to her mother at ʻĀinahau. She would sometimes be called the "Peacock Princess". Her beloved peacocks could be heard screaming in the night when she died. It was later determined that the late-night activities and lights likely agitated the birds, but others still believed that the peacocks were mourning her death. Native Hawaiian protocol dictated that the body of an aliʻi (royal) could only be moved after midnight following death and had to be interred on the sabbath. She lay in her own home until Saturday, March 11, when her body was moved just after midnight. The route from ʻĀinahau to the lying in state at Kawaiahaʻo Church became a growing funeral procession as native Hawaiians fell in line with lit torches and wailed mournfully.

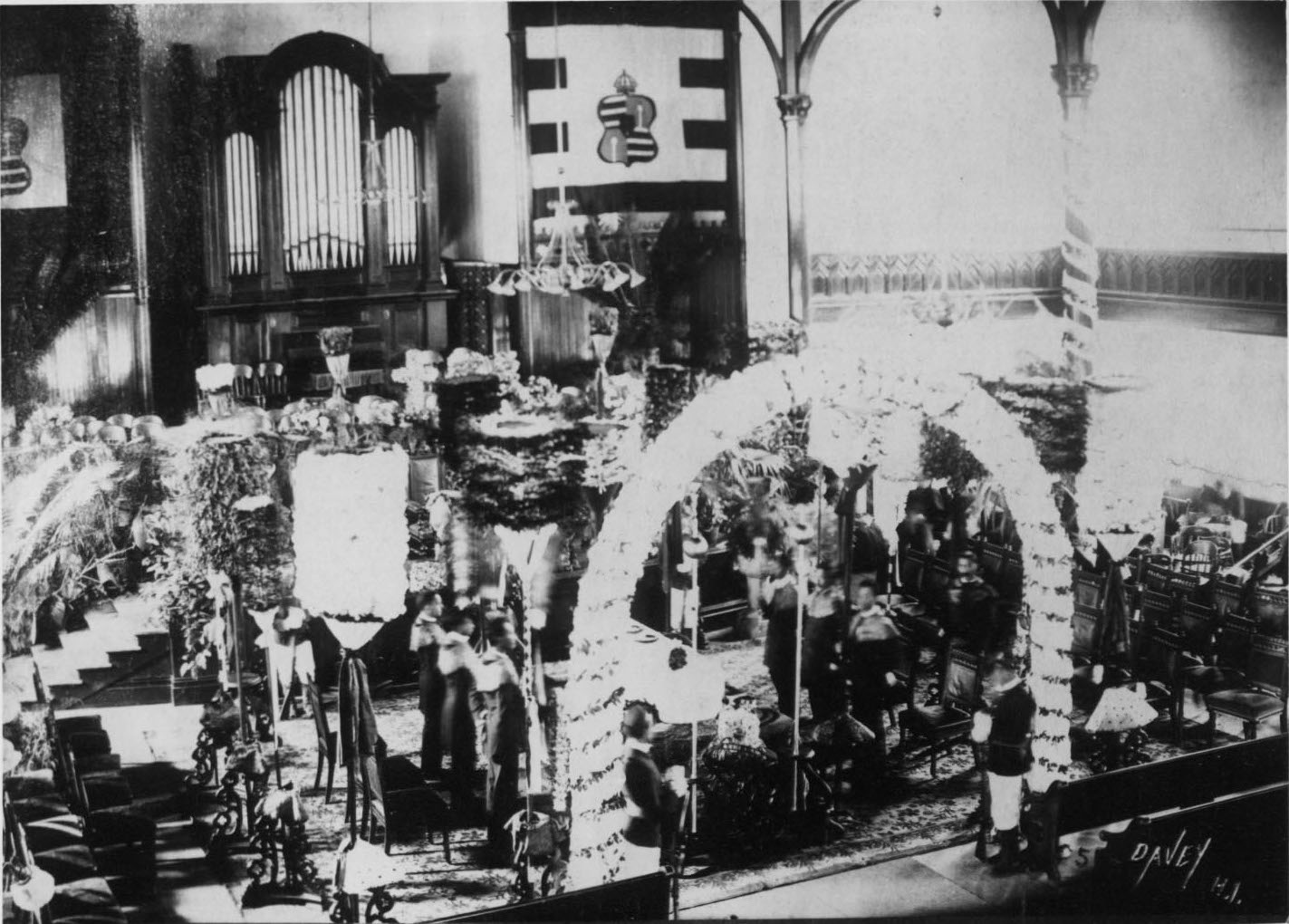
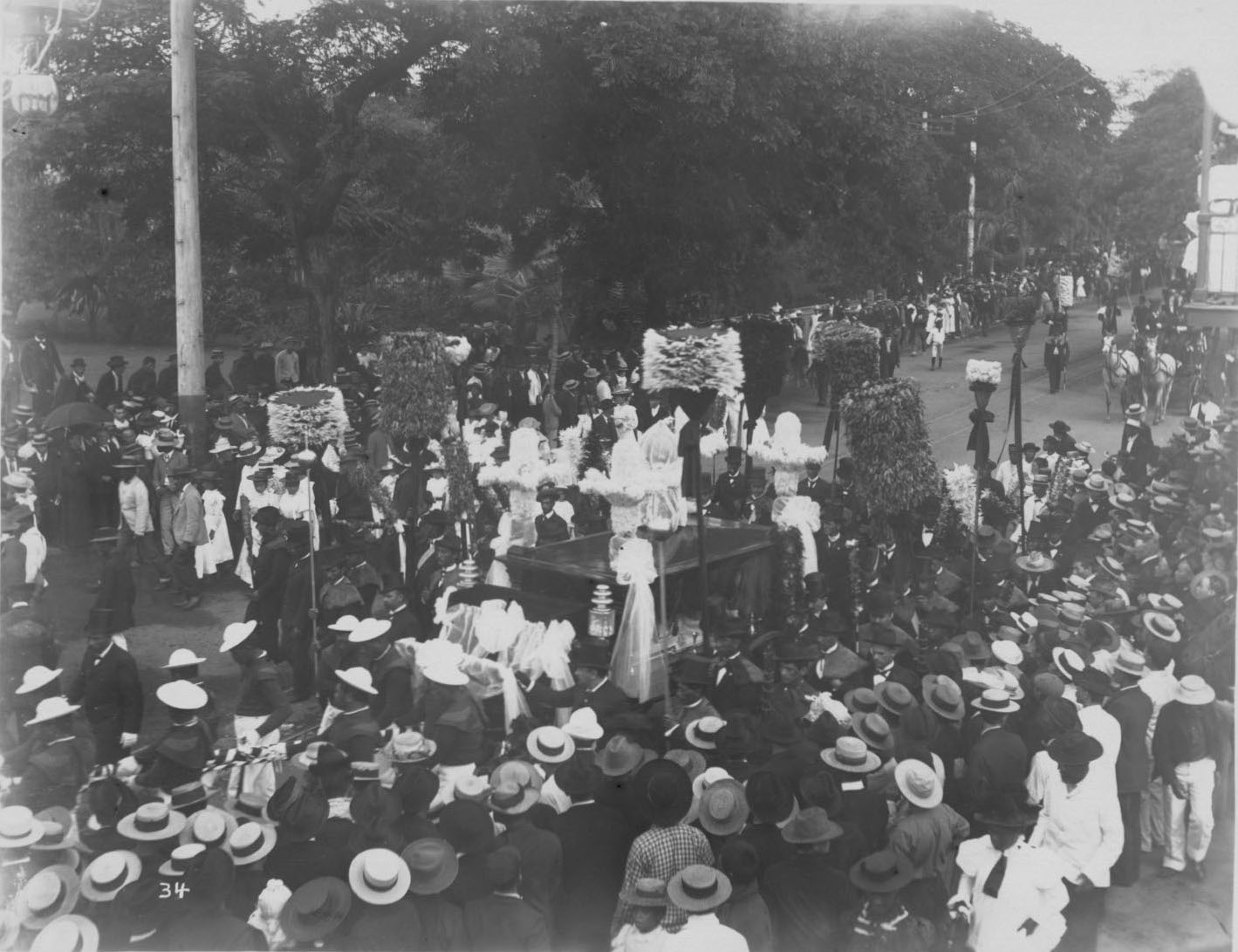
Kaʻiulani lying in state at Kawaiahaʻo Church and her funeral procession through Honolulu, 1899

The Republic of Hawaii government put all its resources at the family's disposal and gave her a state funeral on March 12. She lay in state at Kawaiahaʻo Church until her final service. Hundreds of individuals and organizations made up the procession. The Pacific Commercial Advertiser estimated that 20,000 spectators lined the streets. The most-recent (1896) census had shown only 29,000 residents in all of Honolulu. Her remains were brought to the Royal Mausoleum of Hawaii at ʻMauna Ala in the Nuʻuanu Valley for burial. She was interred in the main chapel of the mausoleum, joining her mother Likelike and the other deceased members of the royal houses of Kalākaua and Kamehameha.

In a ceremony officiated by Liliʻuokalani on June 24, 1910, the family's remains were transferred for a final time to the underground Kalākaua Crypt after the main mausoleum building had been converted into a chapel. Her father was also interred in the crypt after his death on November 1, 1910.

== Cultural impact and legacy ==
When Kaʻiulani was born, kerosene lamps provided Honolulu's street lighting. During Kalākaua's 1881 world tour, he visited Thomas Edison who gave him a demonstration of electric light bulbs. ʻIolani Palace led the way in and installed the first electric lighting in Hawaii in 1886. The public was invited to attend the first-night lighting ceremonies. The Royal Hawaiian Band entertained, refreshments were served, and the king, on horseback, paraded his troops around the grounds. When Honolulu finally electrified all its street lighting, the honor of throwing the switch at the Nuʻuanu generators to light up the city fell to 12-year-old Kaʻiulani on Friday, March 23, 1888.

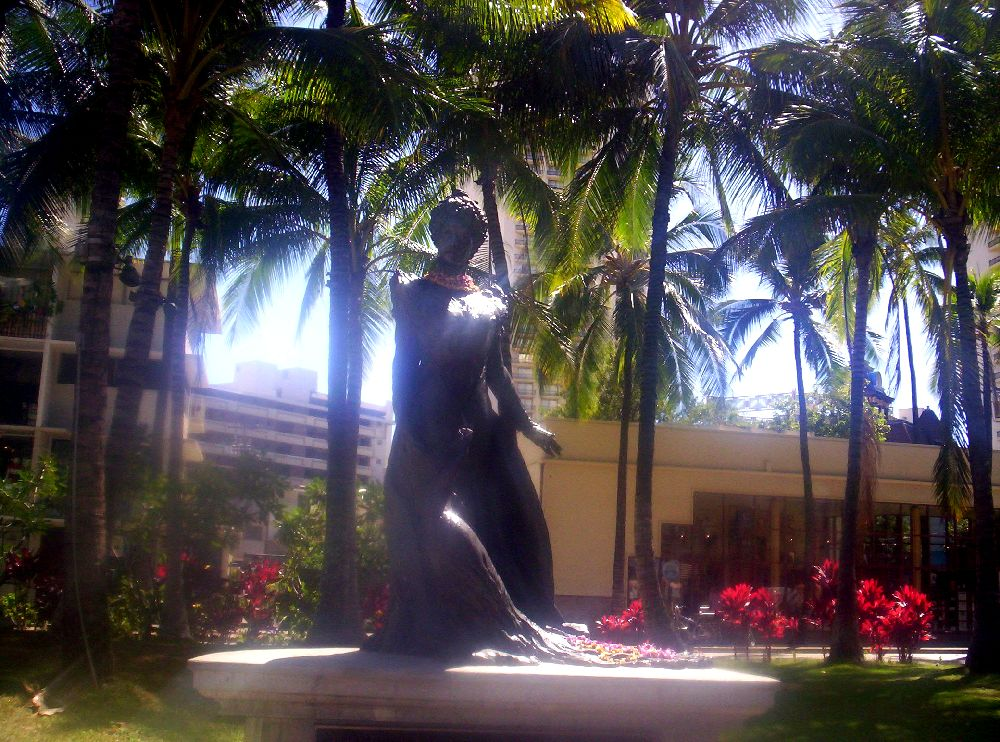
The Kaʻiulani statue in Waikiki

In the fall of 2007, British filmmaker Marc Forby began production on a $9 million film titled Barbarian Princess based on the princess' attempts to restore her nation's independence. Princess Kaʻiulani was played by 12-year-old Kaimana Paʻaluhi of Oahu and by Q'Orianka Kilcher. Barry Pepper, Will Patton, and Shaun Evans co-star. In March 2008, scenes were filmed on location at the ʻIolani Palace. The film's world premiere was held at the Hawaii Theatre in Honolulu, Hawaii, on Friday, October 16, 2009, as part of the Hawaii International Film Festival. The film's title provoked controversy, and the film opened with mixed reviews. However, demand to see the film was high and the film festival scheduled several additional screenings. The movie's title has since been changed to Princess Kaʻiulani. Roadside Attractions acquired the movie's United States rights and scheduled it for theatrical release on May 14, 2010.

Forby's film is not the first project to bring the Princess to the screen: Kaʻiulani biographer Kristin Zambucka produced a docudrama called A Cry of Peacocks for Hawaiian television, broadcast in 1994 by Green Glass Productions and KITV. Princess Kaʻiulani was played by Heather Kuʻupuaohelomakamae Marsh.

In 1999, the Outrigger Hotels commissioned a statue of Kaʻiulani at Waikiki. An annual keiki (children) hula festival is held in her honor in October at the Sheraton Princess Kaiulani Hotel (built on the former grounds of ʻĀinahau). In March 2017, Hawaiʻi Magazine ranked her on a list of the most influential women in Hawaiian history.

=== The Kaʻiulani Project ===
The Kaʻiulani Project (aka Princess Ka'iulani Project) began in 2002 with six years of research, presentations throughout the Hawaiian Islands and the writing of a play based on the life of the princess. Members of the project, which was founded by Jennifer Jean Fahrni, include descendants of the princess's family, Hawaiian cultural leaders, kumu hula and Hawaiian educators. Hawaiian cultural representative Wilmont Kamaunu Kahaialii performed the blessing for the project on sacred grounds at Kapalua, Maui.

The goal of the project was to help Kaʻiulani's dual culture and her legacy for the Hawaiian people be more widely known and to ultimately be taught in Hawaiian schools. In 2007 the project began work with Hawaiian educators as well as cultural and performing arts organizations, producing presentations and play readings throughout the state.

On October 16, 2010, The Kaʻiulani Project, in co-ordination with the Royal Guards of Hawaii produced the Lahaina Royal Hoʻike where official Hawaiian protocols were performed for the first time in honor of Kaʻiulani in over 100 years. Delegations from all islands took part in the event on the sacred grounds of Mokuʻula and Waiola Church. This was first time since Princess Kaʻiulani’s passing that her family participated in official Hawaiian celebrations of her life. Hoʻokupu offerings were presented to and received by Kaʻiulani’s grand-niece in honor of the princess’s 135th birthday. Numerous civic and cultural organizations in Hawaii including the Royal Order of Kamehameha I participate in the event. Entertainment was provided by the Royal Hawaiian Band, Richard Ho’opi’i, The Kahaiali’i Ohana, Na Kamali'i O Ke Akua, Hiki No, The Krueger Ohana, Tava Nui Drummers, Kahi Kolu and other performers. The story of the Princess's life was also presented with selected scenes from the original script "Ka’iulani, The Island Rose".

The Kaʻiulani Project includes Kaʻiulani: The Island Rose, a fact-based screenplay and stage play researched and written since 2003 by Fahrni and Carol Harvie-Yamaguchi, and a biography Princess Kaʻiulani – Her Life and Times. The script was first performed as a public reading on April 12, 2008, in Kahului, Hawaii, on Maui.

=== ʻĀinahau and her banyan tree ===
Archibald Cleghorn willed the estate of ʻĀinahau to the Territory of Hawaii for a park to honor Ka'iulani after his death in 1910. However, the territorial legislature refused the gift. The property was subdivided and sold with the Victorian mansion at ʻĀinahau becoming a hotel and then a rental property before it burned down on August 2, 1921. The Daughters of Hawaii, an organization founded in 1903 to preserve the islands' historic legacy, was given responsibility for the care of Ka'iulani's banyan tree. On October 16, 1930, the Daughters of Hawaii installed a bronze plaque near the tree to honor the memory of Ka'iulani and her friendship with Robert Louis Stevenson. However, the mounting cost of annual pruning, and concerns about the health of the tree, led to it being cut down in 1949.

=== Kaʻiulani Elementary School ===
Kaʻiulani Elementary School was founded in the Kapālama neighborhood of Honolulu on April 25, 1899. During Arbor Day of 1900, the school principal planted a cutting from her banyan tree at ʻĀinahau, given to the school by Archibald Cleghorn. Local efforts prevented the tree from being cut down in the 1950s and the tree survives to the present. The bronze plaque from the original banyan tree was later moved to this site. Other cuttings from the original banyan were planted in other parts of Hawaii.

== Ancestry ==
Kalākaua family tree

Key- (k)= Kane (male/husband)
(w)= wahine (female/wife)
Subjects with bold titles, lavender highlighted, bold box= Direct bloodline
Bold title, bold, grey box= Aunts, uncles, cousins line
Bold title, bold white box= European or American (raised to aliʻi status by marriage or monarch's decree)
Regular name and box= makaʻāinana or untitled foreign subject

Kāneikaiwilani (k)
Lonoikahaupu (k)
Keawepoepoe (k)
Kameʻeiamoku (k)
Kepoʻokalani (k)
Kamanawa II (k)
Kapaʻakea (1815–1866)
Kaliokalani (1835–1852)

Kanalohanaui (k)	Keākealani (w)	Ahu-a-ʻI (k)	Piʻilani (w) II	Moana (k)
Kalanikauleleiaiwi (w)	Kauauaʻamahi (k)	Keawe II (k)	Lonomaʻaikanaka (w)	Kauhiahaki (k)	ʻIliki-ā-Moana (w)
Kanoena (w)	Haʻaeamahi (k)	Kekelakekeokalani (w)	Alapaʻi Nui (k)	Keaka (w)	Keeaumoku Nui (k)	Kamakaimoku (w)	Kaeamamao (k) (Note: Genealogy of Liliuokalani, page 400, appendix B, No. 2 Queen of Hawaii, Liliuokalani (1898). Hawaii's Story by Hawaii's Queen. University of Hawaii Press. p. 400. "Kapaakea genealogy.")	Kaolanialiʻi (w)
Kamakaʻeheikuli (w)	Keōua (k)	Kahekili II (k)	Kekuiapoiwa II (w)	Ikuaʻana (w)	Heulu (k)	Moana (w)	Keaweʻopala (k)	Nohomualani (k)
Keaweaheulu (k)	Ululani (w)	Hakau (w)	Kanaʻina (k)	Kauwa (w)	Eia (k)
Alapai (w)	Keohohiwa (w)	Keōpūolani (w)	Kamehameha I	Kalaniʻōpuʻu (k)	Kānekapōlei (w)	Kiʻilaweau (k)	Nāhiʻōleʻa (k)	Kahoʻowaha II (w)	Inaina (w)
Hao (K)	Kailipakalua (w)
Kamokuiki (w)	ʻAikanaka (k)	Kamaeokalani (w)	Kaōleiokū (k)	Keoua (w)	Luahine (w)	Kalaʻimamahu	Kaheiheimālie
Kamehameha II	Kamehameha III	Kekūanaōʻa (k)	Kahalaiʻa; Luanuʻu (k)	Pauahi (w)	Kīnaʻu (w)	Pākī (k)	Kōnia (w)	Kanaʻina II	Kaʻahumanu III
Keohokālole (1816–1869)	Keʻelikōlani (w)	Kamehameha IV	Kamehameha V	Kaʻahumanu IV	Pauahi Bishop (w)	Bishop (k)	Lunalilo (k)
Kalākaua (1836–1891)	Kapiʻolani (1834–1899)	Liliʻuokalani (1838–1917)	Dominis (1832–1891)	Kaʻiulani (1842–?)	Kaʻiminaʻauao (1845–1848)	Cleghorn (1835–1910)	Likelike (1851–1887)	Leleiohoku II (1854–1877)
Kaʻiulani (1875–1899)

== Bibliography ==
=== Books and journals ===
- Allen, Helena G. (1982). The Betrayal of Liliʻuokalani: Last Queen of Hawaii, 1838–1917. Glendale, CA: Arthur H. Clark Company. ISBN 978-0-87062-144-4. OCLC 9576325.
- Andrade, Ernest Jr. (1990). "Great Britain and the Hawaiian Revolution and Republic, 1893–1898" (PDF). The Hawaiian Journal of History. 24. Honolulu: Hawaiian Historical Society: 91–116. hdl:10524/562. OCLC 60626541. Archived (PDF) from the original on June 26, 2020.
- Armstrong, William N. (1904). Around the World with a King. New York: Frederick A. Stokes. OCLC 489773. Archived from the original on March 17, 2016.
- Askman, Douglas V. (2008). "Her Majesty's Disloyal Opposition: An Examination of the English-Language Version of Robert Wilcox's the Liberal, 1892–1893" (PDF). The Hawaiian Journal of History. 42. Honolulu: Hawaiian Historical Society: 177–200. hdl:10524/135. OCLC 60626541. Archived (PDF) from the original on June 26, 2020.
- Baur, John E. (1922). "When Royalty Came To California". California Historical Society Quarterly. 67 (4). Honolulu: Hawaiian Historical Society: 244–64. doi:10.2307/25158494. JSTOR 25158494.
- Bunford, Stephen R. (2011). "Kaʻiulani, the Peacock Princess". Kamehameha's Crown: A History of the Hawaiian Monarchy. Bloomington, IN: Worldclay. pp. 184–96. ISBN 978-1-60481-945-8. OCLC 865107256. Archived from the original on July 10, 2020.
- Clark, John R. K. (2011). Hawaiian Surfing: Traditions from the Past. Honolulu: University of Hawaii Press. ISBN 978-0-8248-6032-5. OCLC 794925343.
- Cleghorn, Thomas A. K.; Cleghorn, Nellie Yarnell Maxwell; Argow, Dorothy; Allen, Katherine B. (1979). "Thomas Alexander Kaulaahi Cleghorn" (PDF). Oral History Project. Honolulu: The Watumull Foundation: 1–82. hdl:10524/48595. OCLC 10006035. Archived (PDF) from the original on June 27, 2020.
- Davies, Theophilus Harris (1893). "The Hawaiian Situation". The North American Review. 156 (438): 605–10. ISSN 0029-2397. JSTOR 25103136. OCLC 84186580.
- Dole, Sanford B. (1936). Farrell, Andrew (ed.). Memoirs of the Hawaiian Revolution. Honolulu: Advertiser Publishing Company. OCLC 4823270. Archived from the original on December 29, 2019.
- Dudoit, D. Mähealani, ed. (2002). ʻÖiwi: A Native Hawaiian Journal. Vol. 2. Honolulu: Kuleana ʻÖiwi Press. ISBN 0-9668220-2-1. OCLC 402770968.
  - Requilmán, Arnold Hōkūlani. "A Hundred Years after the Pīkake Princess". In Dudoit (2002), pp. 198–218.
- Environmental Impact Statement Preparation Notice: Princess Kaʻiulani Renovation & Development and the Replacement of the Moana Surfrider Hoetel Diamond Head with a New Tower (PDF). Honolulu: Kyo-ya Hotel & Resorts. February 2009.
- Feeser, Andrea; Chan, Gaye (2006). Waikiki: A History of Forgetting and Remembering. Honolulu: University of Hawaii Press. ISBN 978-0-8248-2979-7. JSTOR ctt6wqr1w. OCLC 1090204874.
- Fojas, Camilla (2014). Islands of Empire: Pop Culture and U.S. Power. Austin: University of Texas Press. pp. 93–94. doi:10.7560/756304. ISBN 978-0-292-75632-8. JSTOR 10.7560/756304.8. OCLC 958293300.
- Forbes, David W. (1992). Encounters with Paradise: Views of Hawaii and Its People, 1778–1941. Honolulu: Honolulu Academy of Arts. ISBN 978-0-7103-0454-4. OCLC 24550242.
- Forbes, David W., ed. (2003). Hawaiian National Bibliography, 1780–1900. Vol. 4: 1881–1900. Honolulu: University of Hawaii Press. ISBN 978-0-8248-2636-9. OCLC 123279964. Archived from the original on June 13, 2020.
- Haley, James L. (2014). Captive Paradise: A History of Hawaii. New York: St. Martin's Press. ISBN 978-0-312-60065-5. OCLC 865158092. Archived from the original on June 13, 2020.
- Hawaii Legislature (1882). Chapter XLVI. An Act Making Specific Appropriations For The Use Of The Government During The Two Years Which End With The 31st Day of March, In The Year One Thousand Eight Hundred And Eighty-Four. Laws of His Majesty Kalakaua, King of the Hawaiian Islands: Passed by the Legislative Assembly at Its Session of 1882. Honolulu: Black & Auld. pp. 107–21. OCLC 42350849. Archived from the original on July 9, 2020.
- Hawaii Legislature (1888). Chapter LXXV. An Act Making Specific Appropriations For The Use of The Government During The Two Years Which End With The 31st Day of March, In The Year A. D. 1890. Laws of His Majesty Kalakaua, King of the Hawaiian Islands: Passed by the Legislative Assembly at Its Session of 1882. Honolulu: Black & Auld. pp. 166–81. OCLC 42350849. Archived from the original on July 9, 2020.
- Hawaii Legislature (1892). Chapter LXXVIII. An Act Making Specific Appropriations For The Use Of The Government During The Two Years Which End With The 31st Day Of March, In The Year A. D. 1894 (Binder's title: Hawaiian Islands laws). Laws of Her Majesty Liliʻuokalani, Queen of the Hawaiian Islands: Passed by the Legislative Assembly at Its Session, 1892. Honolulu: Robert Grieve. pp. 197–228. OCLC 156231006. Archived from the original on June 26, 2020.
- Hodges, William C. Jr. (1918). The Passing of Liliʻuokalani: Preceded by a Brief Historical Interpretation of the Life of Liliʻuokalani of Hawaii. Honolulu: Honolulu Star-Bulletin. OCLC 4564101. Archived from the original on July 12, 2017.
- Hoyt, Edwin Palmer (1983). Davies: The Inside Story of a British-American Family in the Pacific and Its Business Enterprises. Honolulu: Topgallant Publishing Company. ISBN 978-0-914916-57-4. OCLC 10198570.
- Iaukea, Sydney Lehua (2012). The Queen and I: A Story of Dispossessions and Reconnections in Hawaiʻi. Berkeley: University of California Press. ISBN 978-0-520-95030-6. OCLC 763161035. Archived from the original on April 12, 2020 – via Questia.
- Johnstone, Arthur (1905). Recollections of Robert Louis Stevenson in the Pacific. London : Chatto & Windus. ISBN 9780841453241. OCLC 978647261.
- Judd, A. Francis; Hawaiian Historical Society (1936). "Lunalilo, the Sixth King of Hawaii" (PDF). Forty-Fourth Annual Report of the Hawaiian Historical Society for the Year 1935. Honolulu: Hawaiian Historical Society: 27–43. hdl:10524/50. Archived (PDF) from the original on June 26, 2020.
- Kaeo, Peter; Queen Emma (1976). Korn, Alfons L. (ed.). News from Molokai, Letters Between Peter Kaeo & Queen Emma, 1873–1876 (PDF). Honolulu: The University Press of Hawaii. hdl:10125/39980. ISBN 978-0-8248-0399-5. OCLC 2225064. Archived (PDF) from the original on June 27, 2020.
- Kam, Ralph Thomas (2017). Death Rites and Hawaiian Royalty: Funerary Practices in the Kamehameha and Kalākaua Dynasties, 1819–1953. S. I.: McFarland, Incorporated, Publishers. ISBN 978-1-4766-6846-8. OCLC 966566652. Archived from the original on December 24, 2019.
- Kam, Ralph Thomas (2011). "The Legacy of ʻĀinahau: The Genealogy of Kaʻiulani's Banyan" (PDF). The Hawaiian Journal of History. 45. Honolulu: Hawaiian Historical Society: 49–68. hdl:10524/33781. OCLC 60626541. Archived (PDF) from the original on June 26, 2020.
- Kam, Ralph Thomas; Stassen-McLaughlin, Marilyn (2024). Princess Victoria Ka'iulani: Last Heir of the Hawaiian Kingdom. McFarland. ISBN 978-1-4766-9469-6. OCLC 1394895576.
- Kamae, Lori (1980). The Empty Throne. Honolulu: Topgallant Publishing Co. ISBN 978-0-914916-44-4. OCLC 7080687. Archived from the original on December 29, 2019.
- Kamehiro, Stacy L. (2009). The Arts of Kingship: Hawaiian Art and National Culture of the Kalākaua Era. Honolulu: University of Hawaii Press. ISBN 978-0-8248-3263-6. OCLC 663885792.
- Kanahele, George S. (1995). Waikīkī, 100 B.C. to 1900 A.D.: An Untold Story. Honolulu: University of Hawaii Press. ISBN 978-0-8248-1790-9. OCLC 33009852.
- Kuykendall, Ralph Simpson (1943). "Negotiation of the Hawaiian Annexation Treaty of 1893" (PDF). Fifty-First Annual Report of the Hawaiian Historical Society for the Year 1942. Honolulu: Hawaiian Historical Society: 5–64. hdl:10524/90. Archived (PDF) from the original on June 29, 2020.
- Kuykendall, Ralph Simpson (1965) [1938]. The Hawaiian Kingdom 1778–1854, Foundation and Transformation. Vol. 1. Honolulu: University of Hawaii Press. ISBN 0-87022-431-X. OCLC 47008868. Archived from the original on September 25, 2014.
- Kuykendall, Ralph Simpson (1953). The Hawaiian Kingdom 1854–1874, Twenty Critical Years. Vol. 2. Honolulu: University of Hawaii Press. ISBN 978-0-87022-432-4. OCLC 47010821. Archived from the original on December 13, 2014.
- Kuykendall, Ralph Simpson (1967). The Hawaiian Kingdom 1874–1893, The Kalākaua Dynasty. Vol. 3. Honolulu: University of Hawaii Press. ISBN 978-0-87022-433-1. OCLC 500374815. Archived from the original on January 20, 2015.
- Liliʻuokalani (1898). Hawaii's Story by Hawaii's Queen, Liliʻuokalani. Boston: Lee & Shepard. ISBN 978-0-548-22265-2. OCLC 2387226.
- Linnea, Sharon (1999). Princess Kaʻiulani: Hope of a Nation, Heart of a People. Grand Rapids, MI: Eerdmans Young Readers. ISBN 978-0-8028-5088-1. OCLC 36727806.
- Marumoto, Masaji (1976). "Vignette of Early Hawaii-Japan Relations: Highlights of King Kalākaua's Sojourn in Japan on His Trip around the World as Recorded in His Personal Diary" (PDF). The Hawaiian Journal of History. 10. Hawaiian Historical Society: 52–63. hdl:10524/291. Archived (PDF) from the original on June 26, 2020.
- Mcdermott, John F.; Choy, Zita Cup; Guerrero, Anthony P. S. (2015). "The Last Illness and Death of Hawaiʻi's King Kalākaua: A New Historical/Clinical Perspective Cover". The Hawaiian Journal of History. 49. Honolulu: Hawaiian Historical Society: 59–72. doi:10.1353/hjh.2015.0002. hdl:10524/56606. OCLC 60626541. S2CID 162545638. Archived from the original on August 1, 2018.
- Mehmed, Ali (1998). "Hoʻohuiʻaina Pala Ka Maiʻa: Remembering Annexation One Hundred Years Ago". The Hawaiian Journal of History. 32. Honolulu: Hawaiian Historical Society: 141–154. hdl:10524/358. OCLC 60626541.
- Mitchell, Aulii; Hazlett, Alexander Hazlett; Hammatt, Hallett H.; Shideler, David W. (April 2009). Cultural Impact Assessment Report for the Proposed Princess Kaʻiulani Redevelopment Project Waikīkī Ahupuaʻa, Kona District, Oʻahu TMK: [1] 2-6-022:001 and 041. Prepared for Kyo-ya Hotels and Resorts, LP (PDF). Final Environmental Impact Statement: Princess Kaʻiulani Renovation & Development and the Replacement of the Moana Surfrider Hotel Diamond Head Tower with a New Tower: Volume II: Appendices 13–20 (Report). Honolulu: Kyo-ya Hotel & Resorts, LP.
- Moser, Patrick (December 2016). "The Endurance of Surfing in 19th-century Hawaiʻi". The Journal of the Polynesian Society. 125 (4). Wellington: The Polynesian Society: 411–432. doi:10.15286/jps.125.4.411-432. OCLC 6925648463.
- Parker, David "Kawika" (2008). "Crypts of the Ali'i The Last Refuge of the Hawaiian Royalty". Tales of Our Hawaiʻi (PDF). Honolulu: Alu Like, Inc. OCLC 309392477. Archived from the original (PDF) on November 11, 2013.
- Peterson, Barbara Bennett, ed. (1984). Notable Women of Hawaii. Honolulu: University of Hawaii Press. ISBN 978-0-8248-0820-4. OCLC 11030010.
- Proto, Neil Thomas (2009). The Rights of My People: Liliʻuokalani's Enduring Battle with the United States, 1893–1917. New York: Algora Publishing. ISBN 978-0-87586-720-5. OCLC 319248358. Archived from the original on July 16, 2020.
- Pukui, Mary Kawena; Elbert, Samuel H. (1986). Hawaiian Dictionary: Hawaiian-English, English-Hawaiian. Honolulu: University of Hawaii Press. ISBN 978-0-8248-0703-0. OCLC 12751521. Archived from the original on January 1, 2015.
- Pukui, Mary Kawena; Elbert, Samuel H.; Mookini, Esther T. (1974). Place Names of Hawaii. Honolulu: University of Hawaii Press. ISBN 978-0-8248-0524-1. OCLC 1042464. Archived from the original on November 1, 2019.
- Quigg, Agnes (1988). "Kalakaua's Hawaiian Studies Abroad Program" (PDF). The Hawaiian Journal of History. 22. Honolulu: Hawaiian Historical Society: 170–208. hdl:10524/103. OCLC 60626541. Archived (PDF) from the original on June 27, 2020.
- Runyon, Rosanna; Yucha, Trevor; Shideler, David; Hammatt, Hallett H. (October 2009). Draft Archaeological Inventory Survey Report for the Proposed Princess Kaʻiulani Redevelopment Project Waikīkī Ahupuaʻa, Kona District, Oʻahu TMK: [1] 2-6-022:001 and 041. Prepared for Kyo-ya Hotels and Resorts, LP (PDF). Final Environmental Impact Statement: Princess Kaʻiulani Renovation & Development and the Replacement of the Moana Surfrider Hoetel Diamond Head with a New Tower: Volume II: Appendices 13–20 (Report). Honolulu: Kyo-ya Hotel & Resorts, LP.
- Schweizer, Niklaus Rudolf (1982). Hawaiʻi and the German Speaking Peoples. Honolulu: Topgallant Publishing Company. ISBN 978-0-914916-60-4. OCLC 611085646.
- Severson, Don R.; Horikawa, Michael D.; Saville, Jennifer (2002). Finding Paradise: Island Art in Private Collections. Honolulu: Honolulu Academy of Arts; University of Hawaiʻi Press. ISBN 978-0-8248-2657-4. OCLC 123158782. Archived from the original on July 19, 2020.
- Stassen-McLaughlin, Marilyn (1999). "Unlucky Star – Princess Kaʻiulani" (PDF). The Hawaiian Journal of History. 33. Honolulu: Hawaiian Historical Society: 21–54. hdl:10524/450. OCLC 60626541. Archived (PDF) from the original on June 17, 2020.
- Stevenson, Robert Louis (1991) [1973]. A. Grove Day. (ed.). Travels in Hawaii. Honolulu: University of Hawaii Press. ISBN 978-0-8248-1397-0. OCLC 23217527. Archived from the original on July 9, 2020.
- Teves, Stephanie Nohelani (2018). "The Afterlife of Princess Kaʽiulani". Defiant Indigeneity: The Politics of Hawaiian Performance. Chapel Hill: University of North Carolina Press. pp. 113–144. ISBN 978-1-4696-4056-3. JSTOR 10.5149/9781469640570_teves.9. OCLC 1028956434.
- Teves, Stephanie Nohelani (2019). "Princess Ka'iulani Haunts Empire in Waīkikī". In Hokulani K. Aikau and Vernadette Vicuña Gonzalez (ed.). Detours: A Decolonial Guide to Hawaiʻi. Durham: Duke University Press. pp. 67–76. doi:10.2307/j.ctv11smvvj.14. ISBN 978-1-4780-0720-3. JSTOR j.ctv11smvvj.14. OCLC 1089781742.
- Thomas, Jean (1991). A History of the Customs Service in Hawaii, 1789–1989. Honolulu: Department of the Treasury, United States Customs Service, Pacific Region. OCLC 25424516.
- Thrum, Thomas G., ed. (1901). "Latest Census-Hawaiian Islands. (From the Census Bulletin, Washington, D. C., Nov., 1900.)". Hawaiian Almanac and Annual for 1901. Honolulu: Honolulu Star-Bulletin. pp. 187–188. hdl:10524/31849.
- Thrum, Thomas G., ed. (1909). "New Kalākaua Dynasty Tomb". All About Hawaii: The Recognized Book of Authentic Information on Hawaii. Vol. 36. Honolulu: Honolulu Star-Bulletin. pp. 105–110. Archived from the original on June 26, 2020.
- Thurston, Lorrin A. (1936). Farrell, Andrew (ed.). Memoirs of the Hawaiian Revolution. Honolulu: Honolulu, Advertiser Publishing Company. OCLC 6128790.
- Van Dyke, Jon M. (2008). Who Owns the Crown Lands of Hawaiʻi?. Honolulu: University of Hawaii Press. ISBN 978-0-8248-3211-7. OCLC 163812857. Archived from the original on July 22, 2020.
- Waldron, Else (1967). Honolulu 100 Years Ago. Honolulu: Fisher Print Company. OCLC 433915. Archived from the original on July 9, 2020.
- Webb, Nancy; Webb, Jean Francis (1998) [1962]. Kaʻiulani: Crown Princess of Hawaii. Honolulu: Mutual Publishing. ISBN 978-1-56647-206-7. OCLC 265217757.
- Zambucka, Kristin (1998). Princess Ka'iulani of Hawaiʻi: The Monarchy's Last Hope. Honolulu: Mutual Publishing. ISBN 978-1-56647-710-9. OCLC 149442849. Archived from the original on June 13, 2020.

=== Newspapers and online sources ===
- "Affairs In Hawaii". The Evening Republican. Meadville, PA. May 16, 1895. p. 1. Archived from the original on July 22, 2020.
- "Betrothal of Royal Hawaiians". The San Francisco Call. February 11, 1898. p. 2, col. 1. Archived from the original on June 20, 2020.
- "Birthday Of Late Princess Kaiulani Observed By Pupils". Honolulu Star-Bulletin. Honolulu. October 16, 1916. p. 1.
- Britton, Easkey (December 27, 2014). "Womens Surfing Roots". Sports International Magazine. Archived from the original on May 17, 2021.
- Burlingame, Burl (October 20, 2009). "Missed opportunities abound in 'Princess' film". Honolulu Star-Bulletin. Honolulu. p. 30.
- "Christmas". The Pacific Commercial Advertiser. Honolulu. January 1, 1876. p. 2.
- Dekneef, Matthew (March 8, 2017). "15 extraordinary Hawaii women who inspire us all. We can all learn something from these historic figures". Hawaiʻi Magazine. Honolulu. Archived from the original on March 8, 2017.
- "Dr. Walters is Dead on Coast". Honolulu Star-Bulletin. August 23, 1932. Archived from the original on June 15, 2020.
- "Electric Light". The Daily Bulletin. July 22, 1886. p. Image 3, col. 2. Archived from the original on June 27, 2020.
- Farrell, Joseph (May 7, 2009). "The story of Robert Louis Stevenson and a Hawaiian princess". The National. Archived from the original on July 3, 2020.
- "Further Postponed – Annexation Treaty Abandoned By The Late Session". Evening Bulletin. Honolulu. March 10, 1893. p. 3. Archived from the original on July 3, 2020.
- "Hawaiian Matters – Princess Kaʻiulani Is Going to Be Married Soon". The Sacramento Bee. Sacramento. November 17, 1897. p. 1.
- "Her Only Plaint". The San Francisco Call. San Francisco. March 2, 1893. p. 1. Archived from the original on July 3, 2020.
- "H.R.H. Princess Kaʻiulani Proclaimed Successor to the Throne of Hawaii". The Pacific Commercial Advertiser. March 10, 1891.
- Hulstrand, Janet (May 8, 2009). "Kaʻiulani: Hawaii's Island Rose". Smithsonian Magazine. Smithsonian Institution. Archived from the original on November 18, 2018.
- "Is Now In Kawaiahao". Evening Bulletin. March 11, 1899. Archived from the original on June 16, 2020.
- "Kaʻiulani alleged engagement to – her father denies it". The Hawaiian Gazette. May 2, 1893.
- "Kaʻiulani's Appeal". The Boston Globe. March 2, 1893.
- "Kaiulani's Gay Chatter". The Sun. New York. October 24, 1897. p. 5.
- "Kalakaua Visits Edison". The Sun. September 26, 1881. p. Image 1, Col. 7. Archived from the original on June 29, 2020.
- Kapiikauinamoku (December 11, 1955). "Chiefess Recognizes Exalted Birth of Kaʻiulani – Song of Eternity". The Honolulu Advertiser. Honolulu. p. 60.
- Kay, Jeremy (February 9, 2010). "Roadside drawn to Hawaiian biopic Princess Kaʻiulani: Roadside Attractions has acquired all US rights to Marc Forby's Hawaiian historical biopic Princess Kaʻiulani". Screen Daily. Archived from the original on June 28, 2010.
- "Kuehne Beveridge's Bust of Kaʻiulani". The Butte Daily Post. Butte, MT. April 15, 1899. p. 14.
- Leong, Lavonne (December 2009). "Unseen Treasures". Honolulu Magazine. Honolulu. Archived from the original on June 17, 2020.
- "Local and General". The Pacific Commercial Advertiser. Honolulu. March 8, 1884. p. 5.
- Martin, Andy (April 9, 2012). "Britain's original beach boys". The Times. London.
- Museum of British Surfing (2012). "Hawaiian royals surf Bridlington – in 1890!". Museum of British Surfing.
- "No Wonder Theophilus Wanted Kaʻiulani to Have a Future". The Hawaiian Gazette. June 26, 1894.
- "Not In A Hurry". The Pacific Commercial Advertiser. Honolulu. March 11, 1893. p. 4. Archived from the original on July 3, 2020.
- "Over 20,000 people saw the funeral". The Pacific Commercial Advertiser. March 13, 1899.
- "Passengers Departed on December 6, 1898". Evening Bulletin. December 6, 1898.
- Perry, John W. (October–November 2003). "The Island Rose". Hana Hou!. Vol. 6, no. 5. Honolulu. Archived from the original on December 15, 2010.
- "Prince David Denies". The Hawaiian Star. February 19, 1898. Archived from the original on June 14, 2020.
- "A Positive Denial – Kaʻiulani Had no Throne or Flag to Be Deprived or Robbed of". The Nebraska State Journal. Lincoln. February 21, 1893. p. 1.
- "Relief is Ready; Honolulu Ladies Quickly Form Red Cross Corps; Mrs. Sewall the Leader". Hawaiian Gazette. Vol. XXXIII, no. 45. June 7, 1898. p. 5 – via Newspapers.com.
- Rix, Alice (August 7, 1898). "The Princess Who Wanted to Be Queen". The San Francisco Call. Richmond. pp. 17, 29. Archived from the original on June 22, 2020.
- "A Royal Christening". The Hawaiian Gazette. Honolulu. December 29, 1875. p. 2. Archived from the original on June 29, 2020.
- Ryan, Tim (January 21, 1993). "Legacy of a princess". Honolulu Star-Bulletin. Honolulu. p. 21.
- "The Succession Princess Kaʻiulani Proclaimed Successor to the Hawaiian Throne". The Daily Bulletin. Vol. XV, no. 57. Honolulu. March 9, 1891. Image 2, col. 2. Archived from the original on October 3, 2017.
- "Say Tis Not True". The Hawaiian Star. Honolulu. November 16, 1897. p. 8. Archived from the original on June 21, 2020.
- Scott, Marjorie J. (September 8, 1995). "Contributions of royal family recognized". The Honolulu Advertiser. Honolulu. p. 17. Archived from the original on July 30, 2018.
- Tighe, Michael (August 9, 1998). "Hawaii's Own: A look at a century of annexation". Associated Press. Archived from the original on July 6, 2010.
- "Town Life Joys". The Pacific Commercial Advertiser. Honolulu. September 10, 1898. p. 3. Archived from the original on July 22, 2020.
- Tsai, Michael (October 17, 2009). "Ka'iulani film met with applause, disappointment". The Honolulu Advertiser. Archived from the original on October 21, 2009.
- Viotti, Vicki (September 7, 1993). "Docudrama looks at princess who lost her legacy". The Honolulu Advertiser. Honolulu. p. 13.
- "Was Not Ready". The Pacific Commercial Advertiser. June 28, 1898. p. 3. Archived from the original on June 19, 2020.
- Wood, Ben (September 27, 2008). "Kaiulani surfed while studying in England". Honolulu Star-Bulletin. Honolulu. p. 35.
- "Wood-Parker – Two Prominent Hawaiians Joined in Wedlock – Gay Festivities at Mana-i-ka-Uhiwai". The Independent. December 19, 1898. Archived from the original on June 26, 2020.
