= Princess Kaiulani (film) =

2009 British-American biographical drama film by Marc Forby

- US theatrical release poster
- Directed by: Marc Forby
- Written by: Marc Forby; Robert Payne
- Produced by: Lauri Apelion; Marc Forby; Ricardo S. Galindez; Nigel Thomas; Roy Tjioe
- Starring: Q'orianka Kilcher; Barry Pepper; Will Patton; Julian Glover; Shaun Evans
- Music by: Stephen Warbeck
- Production companies: Island Film Group; ContentFilm
- Distributed by: Roadside Attractions
- Release dates: October 16, 2009 (Hawaii Film Festival); May 14, 2010 (United States)
- Running time: 97 minutes
- Countries: United Kingdom; United States
- Language: English
- Budget: $9 million
- Box office: $883,887

Princess Kaiulani (sometimes titled Barbarian Princess) is a 2009 British-American biographical drama film based on the life of Princess Kaʻiulani (1875–1899) of the Kingdom of Hawaiʻi.

== Plot ==
At ʻIolani Palace, Princess Kaʻiulani and the rest of the royal family prepare for a ceremony that night to light Honolulu with only electricity. That evening, however, the ceremony is interrupted when a large group of armed white men enter the palace grounds. Led by Lorrin Thurston, the men demand that Kaʻiulani's uncle, King Kalākaua, sign a new constitution to restrict the power of the monarchy as well as to grant huge governmental powers to citizens of European ancestry. The situation soon devolves into a tense standoff between Thurston's men and the Royal Guards. Amidst the chaos of the moment Kaʻiulani is taken away for her own safety by her Scottish father, Archie Cleghorn, and sent to England for both protection and education.

Now in England, Kaʻiulani struggles to fit in as her Polynesian heritage makes her a target of racism and offensive stereotypes from the Europeans whom she meets. She does make some friends, including the handsome young Clive Davies. They develop a relationship and the two become engaged. But one day her father returns from Hawaiʻi after several years and, to her shock, informs her that her uncle, King Kalākaua, had died shortly after being forced to sign the new constitution by Thurston and Sanford B. Dole. He then informs her that a failed native rebellion against the new constitution gave Thurston a reason to arrest and depose Queen Liliʻuokalani, overthrowing the monarchy and declaring Hawaiʻi a republic. After discovering that the Davies family knew of her family's overthrow but hid the news from her Kaʻiulani decides to call off her engagement and leave England. She travels to the United States where she gathers media attention and denounces the overthrow as well as the U.S.'s involvement. Her cultured, regal appearance overcomes the racist views against her, and many note that she is not the "Barbarian Princess" she was depicted as at all. Her campaign against the overthrow climaxes with her meeting U.S. President Grover Cleveland. At a lunch with the President, Kaʻiulani charms him and convinces him to actively oppose the overthrow, which he does by refusing to annex Hawaiʻi as an American territory. Unfortunately for Kaʻiulani, this act is done during the waning days of the Cleveland administration, and a few weeks later President William McKinley is inaugurated.

When Kaʻiulani returns to Hawaiʻi, she learns the new president has not only failed to oppose the overthrow but has also accepted Thurston's annexation proposal, annexing Hawaiʻi as a territory of the United States. She attends a small private funeral for the Kingdom of Hawaiʻi, hosted by her aunt, Queen Liliʻuokalani. Shortly after her return, she is visited by Sanford B. Dole, who explains that three U.S. legal commissioners are arriving, and that he and Thurston would like the Princess to host a small dinner for them. Though she is appalled at the impertinent request, he convinces her that it might be to her advantage to. At the dinner, Kaʻiulani charms her visitors before surprising Thurston by publicly petitioning for an amendment to the annexation treaty to guarantee universal suffrage and voting rights to all Native Hawaiians. She is disregarded by an appalled Thurston, who points out she is not a recognized diplomat before Dole stands up for the princess and declares he will petition the amendment for her. As the amendment gathers support amongst the dinner guests, Thurston leaves, embarrassed and furious.

After the dinner, Kaʻiulani is surprised to learn that her former fiancé Clive has come to Hawaiʻi, as he had promised he would, and she goes to see him. He tells her that his father has died and he is now in charge of his assets, including those in Hawaiʻi. The two make up, and Clive asks Kaʻiulani to return to England and marry him. She refuses, stating that her future is in Hawaiʻi. When he equally refuses to move to Hawaiʻi, the two share a last farewell kiss before Clive leaves for England. The film ends with Kaʻiulani returning her treasured seashells, which she had kept throughout her travels to remind her of Hawaiʻi, back to the ocean as she wades in the waves, with a voiceover saying that the bright flame of Kaʻiulani is kept alive by the love of her people. A post-credits card shows that Kaʻiulani died less than one year after the annexation, some say of a broken heart for the loss of her kingdom. Another card mentions that in 1993 President Clinton signed the Apology Resolution, apologizing to Hawaiʻi for the role the United States government played in the overthrow.

== Cast ==
- Q'orianka Kilcher as Princess Kaʻiulani
- Barry Pepper as Lorrin A. Thurston
- Shaun Evans as Clive Davies
- Will Patton as Sanford B. Dole
- Ned Van Zandt as Senator Collum
- Jimmy Yuill as Archibald Scott Cleghorn
- Leo Anderson Akana as Queen Liliʻuokalani
- Ocean Kaʻowili as King Kalākaua
- Reupena Paopao Sheck as Prince David Kawānanakoa "Koa"
- Kimo Kalilikane as Kalehua
- Kamuela Kalilikane as Mamane
- Peter Banks as President Grover Cleveland
- Rosamund Stephen as Mrs. Cleveland
- Julian Glover as Theophilus Harris Davies
- Barbara Wilshere as Mrs. Mary Ellen Davies
- Tamzin Merchant as Alice Davies
- Catherine Steadman as Miss Barnes
- Kainoa Kilcher as Kaleo
- Laura Soller as Mrs. Anna Dole
- Christian Brassington as Duke of Winchester
- Olivia Mardon as Duchess of Winchester
- Jay Lembeck as Premier Walter M. Gibson
- Kaʻalakaʻiopono Faurot as Keiki (Baby) Kaʻiulani

== Controversy ==
The film's working title Barbarian Princess provoked controversy in Hawaiʻi, with individuals stating that it brings up painful memories of past discrimination, whereas others thought that would be a title for a fantasy gothic film akin to Conan the Barbarian (1982). In response, the title was briefly changed to The Last Princess, changed to Princess Kaiulani later in 2008, then shown as Barbarian Princess for the 2009 festival. The producers stated that the title was meant to be ironic and is meant to draw audiences who may not be familiar with the history of Hawaiʻi. The film was finally released for wider distribution as Princess Kaiulani.

Many native Hawaiians were disappointed that the film used a non-Hawaiian for the title role.

== Critical reception ==
As of June 2020, the film holds a 21% approval rating on Rotten Tomatoes, based on 38 reviews with an average rating of 4.5/10. The website's critics consensus reads: "A middling biopic about an important figure in Hawaiian history, Princess Kaiulani looks and feels like a TV movie of the week and offers about as much insight." Roger Ebert called it an "interesting but creaky biopic." Hailed by the Hollywood Reporter and panned by the New York press, Princess Kaiulani was either praised or left audiences cold. The film won the Audience Award for "Best Feature" at the 2009 Honolulu International Film Festival in a tie with Precious: Based on the Novel "Push" by Sapphire.
