= Alexander Young Hotel =

- Alexander Young Building
- Formerly listed on the U.S. National Register of Historic Places
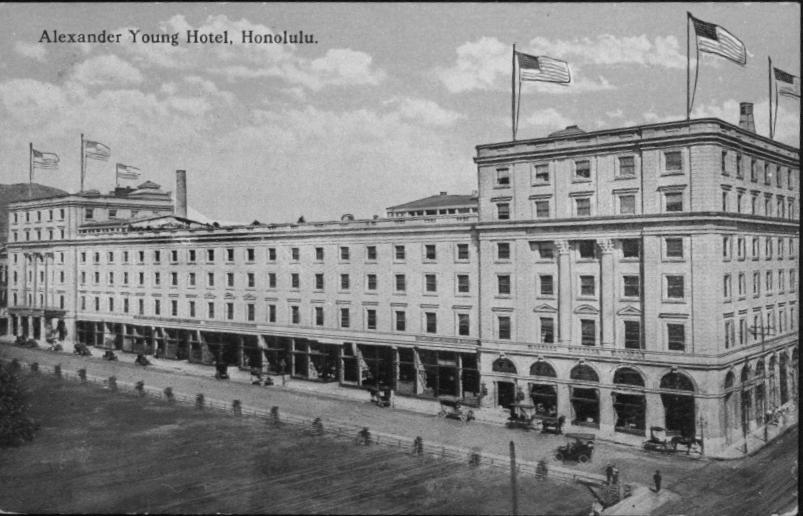
- Alexander Young Hotel, c. 1903

- Location within Hawaii
- Location: Bishop and Hotel Streets, Honolulu, Hawaii
- Coordinates: 21°18′33″N 157°51′37″W
- Area: 1.13 acres (0.46 ha)
- Built: 1900
- Architect: George Percy
- Architectural style: Late 19th, 20th Century and Second Renaissance Revival
- NRHP reference No.: 80001284

Significant dates
- Added to NRHP: August 5, 1980
- Removed from NRHP: October 14, 2009

The Alexander Young Hotel was one of the first hotels in downtown Honolulu, Hawaii, opened in 1903. The hotel closed and was converted to offices in 1964. The structure was demolished in 1981.

== History ==
The Alexander Young Hotel was constructed from 1900 to 1903, at a cost of $2 million, by Scottish-born Honolulu sugar and iron works magnate Alexander Young. The 192-room hotel was designed by California architect George W. Percy. It was his last major commission before he died on December 14, 1900.

The hotel opened on July 31, 1903, with a gala reception attended by 2000 people. It quickly became a social center for the city. Young expanded his hotel empire, the Territorial Hotel Company, by purchasing the Moana Hotel on Waikiki Beach in 1905 and later the first Royal Hawaiian Hotel in downtown Honolulu. After his death, in 1910, the company also purchased the Honolulu Seaside Hotel, adjacent to the Moana. Young "became known as the father of the hotel industry in Hawaii."

In 1917, the United States Army used the second floor of the Alexander Young Hotel, while Fort Shafter was completed. Later that year, the Army & Navy YMCA purchased the first Royal Hawaiian Hotel from the Territorial Hotel Company. The interwar years saw the hotel's Roof Garden become one of Honolulu's most fashionable social venues. Hawaii's first post-Prohibition cocktail lounge license was issued to the hotel in 1933, and the hotel opened Hawaii's first air-conditioned dining room in 1937.

The Matson Navigation Company and Castle & Cooke bought a controlling interest in the Territorial Hotel Company in 1925, in order to demolish their Honolulu Seaside Hotel and construct the modern Royal Hawaiian Hotel on the site. Matson also acquired the Moana with this purchase, but the Alexander Young Hotel's ownership was transferred to the Alexander Young Building Co.

During World War II the military occupied most of the hotel. The Alexander Young Hotel closed and was converted to offices in 1964. The structure was listed on the National Register of Historic Places on August 5, 1980 as the Alexander Young Building. The building was demolished in 1981. The site was removed from the National Register in October 2009.
