= Alexander Young (engineer) =

Scottish engineer and businessman

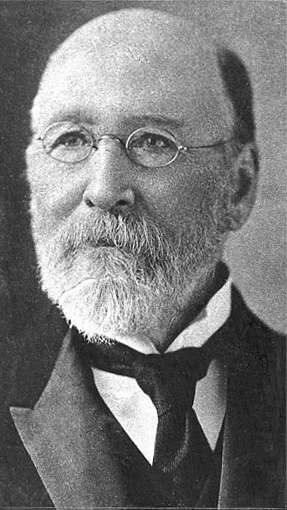
- Born: December 14, 1833; Blackburn, Scotland
- Died: July 2, 1910 (aged 76); Honolulu, Hawaii Territory, USA
- Occupations: Mechanical engineer, businessman
- Children: 9

Alexander Young (December 14, 1833 – July 2, 1910) was a mechanical engineer and politician in the Kingdom of Hawaiʻi.

He began as an apprentice for Alexander Chaplin & Co. in Glasgow, and then Anderson & Co. in London. He married Ruth Pearce in early 1860 and travelled to Vancouver Island on August 26, 1860, to construct a sawmill. The two (with one child) traveled to Hawaii in February 1865. They had nine surviving children.

Young had operated a small foundry and machine shop in Hilo, Hawaii, with William Lidgate, and business expanded with the growth of Hawaii's sugar plantations. He moved to Honolulu around 1869 and bought the Honolulu Iron Works from Thomas Hughes, who had revived the business after a devastating fire in 1860.

In 1875 Theophilus Harris Davies refinanced the Honolulu Iron Works and hired Young as manager. The two then organized the Waiakea Mill Company. Around 1900 he formed the von Hamm-Young Company. Principals were Young's son Archibald Alfred Young and son-in-law Conrad Carl von Hamm. An early project was the Alexander Young Hotel.

In 1887 he became a citizen of the Kingdom of Hawaii, and from 1887 to 1892 served in the House of Nobles. After the 1893 overthrow of the Kingdom of Hawaii, he served on an advisory council for the provisional Government of Hawaii. From October 27, 1899, to May 18, 1900, he served as Minister of the Interior until the Territory of Hawaii government was established.

After Young's death July 2, 1910, and Archibald's in 1925, von Hamm took over the business. It expanded to include automobile dealerships in the 1920s and other businesses. In 1964 it was renamed "The Hawaii Corporation". After von Hamm's death in 1965 the company eventually liquidated in one of Hawaii's first large bankruptcy cases.

== See also ==
- Alexander Young Building
