= Willowdean Chatterson Handy =

American ethnologist, author (1889–1965)

- Born: Willowdean Chatterson; January 10, 1889; Louisville, Kentucky, U.S.
- Died: November 5, 1965 (aged 76); Honolulu, Hawaii, U.S.
- Other names: W. C. Handy, Willowdean Handy
- Education: University of Chicago (PhB), Radcliffe College
- Occupation(s): Ethnologist in Pacific studies, anthropologist, playwright, author, librarian
- Spouse: Edward Smith Craighill Handy (1918–1934; divorced)

Willowdean Chatterson Handy (née Willowdean Chatterson; January 10, 1889 – November 5, 1965) was an American anthropologist and ethnologist in Pacific studies, playwright, librarian, and author. Handy was one of the Board of Regents for the University of Hawaii.

== Life and career ==
Willowdean Chatterson Handy was born on January 10, 1889, in Louisville, Kentucky, to parents Ida (née Cragg), and Joseph Marshall Chatterson. She graduated in 1909 from the University of Chicago with a Ph.B. degree, and took some courses at Radcliffe College.

In 1918, Willowdean Chatterson married Edward Smith Craighill Handy, they often worked together. The marriage ended in divorce.

Handy wrote a number of book about Polynesia. For four years Handy served on the Board of Regents for the University of Hawaii. She was a librarian for the Hawaiian Historical Society for ten years.

She died on November 5, 1965, in Honolulu.

== Publications ==
- Handy, Willowdean Chatterson (1922). Tattooing in the Marquesas. Honolulu, Hawaii: Bishop Museum.
- Craighill Handy, E. S. (Edward Smith); Handy, Willowdean Chatterson (1924). Samoan House Building, Cooking, and Tattooing. Honolulu, Hawaii: Bishop Museum.
- Handy, Willowdean Chatterson (1925). String Figures from the Marquesas and Society Islands. Bishop Museum.
- Handy, Willowdean Chatterson (1927). Handcrafts of the Society Islands. Honolulu, Hawaii: Bishop Museum.
- Handy, Willowdean Chatterson (1938). L'art des îles Marquises. Paris: Les Éditions d'art et d'histoire.
- Handy, Willowdean Chatterson (1965). Forever the Land of Men; an Account of a Visit to the Marquesas Islands. New York: Dodd, Mead & Company.
- Craighill Handy, E. S. (Edward Smith); Handy, Willowdean Chatterson (1971). Samoan House Building, Cooking and Tattooing. Bernice P. Bishop Museum Bulletins. New York: Kraus Reprint.
- Handy, Willowdean Chatterson (1973). Thunder from the Sea. Honolulu, Hawaii: University Press of Hawaii.
