= Frank Morgan (disambiguation) =

Frank Morgan (1890–1949) was an American actor.

Frank Morgan may also refer to:

- Frank Morgan (British academic) (born 1953), former Vice-Chancellor of Bath Spa University
- Frank Morgan (footballer) (1912–1976), Australian footballer
- Frank Morgan (mathematician), American mathematician
- Frank Morgan (musician) (1933–2007), American jazz saxophonist
  - Frank Morgan (album), a 1955 album by the saxophonist
- Frank Morgan (Life on Mars), a fictional character in the British TV series Life on Mars
- Frank Morgan (Home and Away), a fictional character in the Australian soap opera Home and Away
