= Theo H. Davies & Co. =

- Formerly: Starkey, Janion, & Co. (1845-1851); Janion & Co. (1851-1894)
- Founded: April 1845; 181 years ago in Liverpool, England
- Founders: James Starkey; John Starkey; Robert Cheshyre Janion
- Key people: Theophilus Harris Davies
- Parent: Jardine Matheson (from 1973)

Theo H. Davies & Co. is a company that was one of the Big Five trading and agricultural companies in the Territory of Hawaii.

== History ==
Starkey, Janion, & Co. was a trading company founded in Liverpool in April 1845 by Englishmen James and John Starkey and Robert Cheshyre Janion. Janion arrived in Honolulu in August, selling the first boat-load of merchandise. Janion acquired a building in a prime location on the Honolulu Harbor after the firm of Ladd & Co. went out of business, and some of the last undeveloped land that was part of the claim of former British Consul Richard Charlton. The Starkey brothers bought more goods in England, where they were traded with Hawaiian exports and gold. After the California Gold Rush their business soon expanded to include their own fleet of ships, and selling insurance as the local agent for Lloyd's of London.

In 1849 another Briton William Lowthian Green was hired, and when the Starkey brothers pulled out in 1851, the name was changed to Janion & Co. In 1857, Welshman Theophilus Harris Davies arrived in Hawaii and joined the company as a clerk for Green. In 1859 Green became a partner. Davies worked his way up in the company, but left when his contract expired in 1862. In 1863 Davies returned to work as an agent for a sugarcane plantation, but left again when his contract expired in 1866. In 1867 Janion & Green were in financial trouble, and Davies was brought in to reorganize. Davies and Janion formed a new partnership in 1871.

Davies raised capital in London and invested in plantations on the island of Hawaiʻi. In 1875, he refinanced the Honolulu Iron Works and hired Alexander Young. He would partner with Young in a number of future businesses. Davies took full control of the company after Janion died in 1881, and incorporated his growing interests in the sugar industry. The business expanded to add departments for steamship agents, grocery stores, dry goods, and hardware. Under the laws of the Provisional Government of Hawaii, it became Theo. H. Davies & Co., Ltd. in January, 1894.

After Davies died in 1898, Francis Mills Swanzy became managing director and T. Clive Davies (son of Theo) as board member. In 1917 T. Clive Davies and Ernest Hay Wodehouse were named co-managing directors, but Davies died the same day. A new headquarters building built in 1921 served through the 1960s when a 32-story Davies Pacific Center was built at 841 Bishop Street. In 1928 the company opened a Manila branch and expanded with sugarcane plantations in the Philippines. John E. Russell led the company until the 1950s. Geoffrey C. Davies (T. Clive's son) became chairman, followed by Gerald M. Wilkinson. James H. Tabor, Harold E. Weidig, and Milton Pickup then served as presidents. In 1967 Dillingham Corp. made a failed takeover attempt.

Theo H. Davies & Co. remained in family hands until 1973, when the family sold the company to Hong Kong–based conglomerate Jardine Matheson. Davies became the first big five company to get out of sugar, selling the Hamakua Sugar Company in 1984 to Francis S. Morgan. Hamakua Sugar filed for bankruptcy just 8 years later in 1992 and was liquidated.

Jardine then diversified its holdings, buying the franchises in Hawaii for restaurants such as Pizza Hut and Taco Bell and auto marques such as Mercedes-Benz and Jaguar. Starting in 2003, Jardine gradually sold its various holdings in the islands.

Theo H. Davies (Manila), founded in 1928, currently exists as a separate holding company. JTH Davies, under the control of Philippine businessman Eusebio Tanco, who is involved in education, insurance, shipping and overseas job placement businesses in Manila and other locations in the Philippines.

== See also ==
- Sugar plantations in Hawaii
- Theophilus Harris Davies
