= Francis S. Morgan =

- Born: 19 March 1919; Honolulu, Hawaii. U.S.
- Died: 1 August 1999 (aged 80); Honolulu, Hawaii, U.S.
- Occupation: Businessman
- Spouse: Margo Morgan
- Children: 3

Francis S. Morgan (March 19, 1919 – August 1, 1999) was an American businessman, president of the Kualoa Ranch and Hamakua Sugar Company.

Morgan went to school at Hanahauʻoli School and Punahou School in Honolulu and received a degree from Stanford University. He served as a lieutenant in the Navy in the Pacific War in World War II.

After leaving the service he worked at Theo H. Davies & Co., retiring as group vice president for agriculture in 1984. That same year, the company sold its subsidiary, Hāmākua Sugar Company, to a consortium headed by Morgan. Hamuka Sugar filed for bankruptcy in 1992 and was liquidated.

Kualoa Ranch, a cattle ranch founded in the mid-1800s by his great-great-grandfather Gerrit P. Judd, was converted into a filming location for movies as well as a tourist attraction. More than 79 movies and TV shows have been filmed at Kualoa over the years, including Paradise, Hawaiian Style, Jurassic Park, Jurassic World, 50 First Dates, You, Me and Dupree, Hawaii Five-O, Hawaii Five-0, Mighty Joe Young, Pearl Harbor, Windtalkers, Godzilla, Kong: Skull Island, Jumanji, Jumanji: Welcome to the Jungle, Snatched, and Lost.

Morgan was on the board of directors of Hanahauʻoli School, Hawaii Preparatory Academy, and St. Francis Medical Center. He also led the Hawaiian Sugar Planters' Association for numerous years.
