= Frank Morgan (footballer) =

Australian rules footballer, born 1912

Personal information
- Full name: Charles Francis Morgan
- Born: 6 March 1912; Warrnambool, Victoria
- Died: 22 May 1976 (aged 64); Fairfield, Victoria

Playing career^{1}
Years	Club	Games (Goals)
1932	North Melbourne	2 (0)
- ^{1} Playing statistics correct to the end of 1932.

Charles Francis Morgan (6 March 1912 – 22 May 1976) was an Australian rules footballer who played with North Melbourne in the Victorian Football League (VFL).

Morgan later served in the Australian Army during World War II.
