= Hawaiian Historical Society =

The Hawaiian Historical Society, established in 1892, is a private non-profit organized by a group of prominent citizens dedicated to preserving historical materials, presenting public lectures, and publishing scholarly research on Hawaiian history.

== History ==
The first president was Charles Reed Bishop, who founded the Kamehameha Schools in honor of his wife Princess Bernice Pauahi Bishop. Governor Sanford B. Dole also served as President of the Society. Early members included historians Nathaniel Bright Emerson and Ralph Simpson Kuykendall. In one of the Society's first meetings, on February 24, 1892, Queen Liliʻuokalani was voted Patron of the Society. Stella Maude Jones had been a trustee. Willowdean Chatterson Handy served as a librarian of the Hawaiian Historical Society for ten years.

The Society publishes books and the Hawaiian Journal of History. This annual publication is the longest published peer-reviewed journal focusing on the history of both pre- and post-contact Hawaiʻi. The Society's Library, located at the Hawaiian Mission Houses Historic Site and Archives, contains a collection of photos, newspapers, magazines, journals, books, pamphlets, and manuscripts made available to scholars and the public. For example, in 1974, the journal published a retrospective on the 1874 election of King Kalākaua and the ensuing Honolulu Courthouse riot including letters with eyewitness accounts.

As a leading organization studying the history of Hawai'i, the Society presents free public lectures on a regular basis. Its speakers and authors are often featured in the media.
