= Hanahauʻoli School =

Independent school in Honolulu, Hawaii

Location
- 1922 Makiki St; Honolulu, Hawaii 96822
- Coordinates: 21.307420°N 157.831930°W

Information
- School type: Independent elementary school
- Motto: Hanahauʻoli (Joyous Work)
- Established: 1918
- Head of School: Lia Woo
- Primary years taught: Junior Kindergarten through 6th grade
- Color(s): Orange and White
- Website: hanahauoli.org

Hanahauʻoli School is an independent elementary school in Makiki, Hawaii. As of 2012, the school had 207 students with the youngest in Junior Kindergarten and the oldest in 6th grade. The current head of school is Lia Woo, an alumnus of the school.

== History ==
Hanahauʻoli was founded in 1918 by Sophie Cooke and George Cooke, the son of Charles Montague Cooke and Anna Rice Cooke. The school was founded as an experiment in progressive education as advocated by John Dewey, with an emphasis on cooperation and experiential learning, and was visited by Dewey and his wife a few years after its establishment. The initial group of 15 students was made up of the Cooke family's children along with their relatives and friends.

Hanahauʻoli had the first jungle gym in Honolulu.

== The school in recent years ==
Hanahauʻoli operates a professional development center for teachers in the community, which also offers resources for parents. The school also hosts an annual children's fair. In summers 2020 and 2021, Hanahauʻoli offered a five-week tuition-free summer school program for public school students in second through fifth grades.
