= Theophilus Harris Davies =

British businessman (1834–1898)

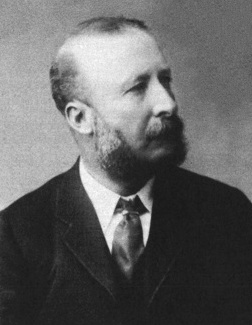
- Born: 4 January 1834; Stourbridge, Worcestershire, England
- Died: 25 May 1898 (aged 64); Tunbridge Wells, Kent
- Occupation: Businessman
- Spouse: Mary Ellen Cocking

Theophilus Harris Davies (4 January 1834 – 25 May 1898) was an English businessman. He was the founder of Theo H. Davies & Co., one of Hawaii's "Big Five" sugar firms.

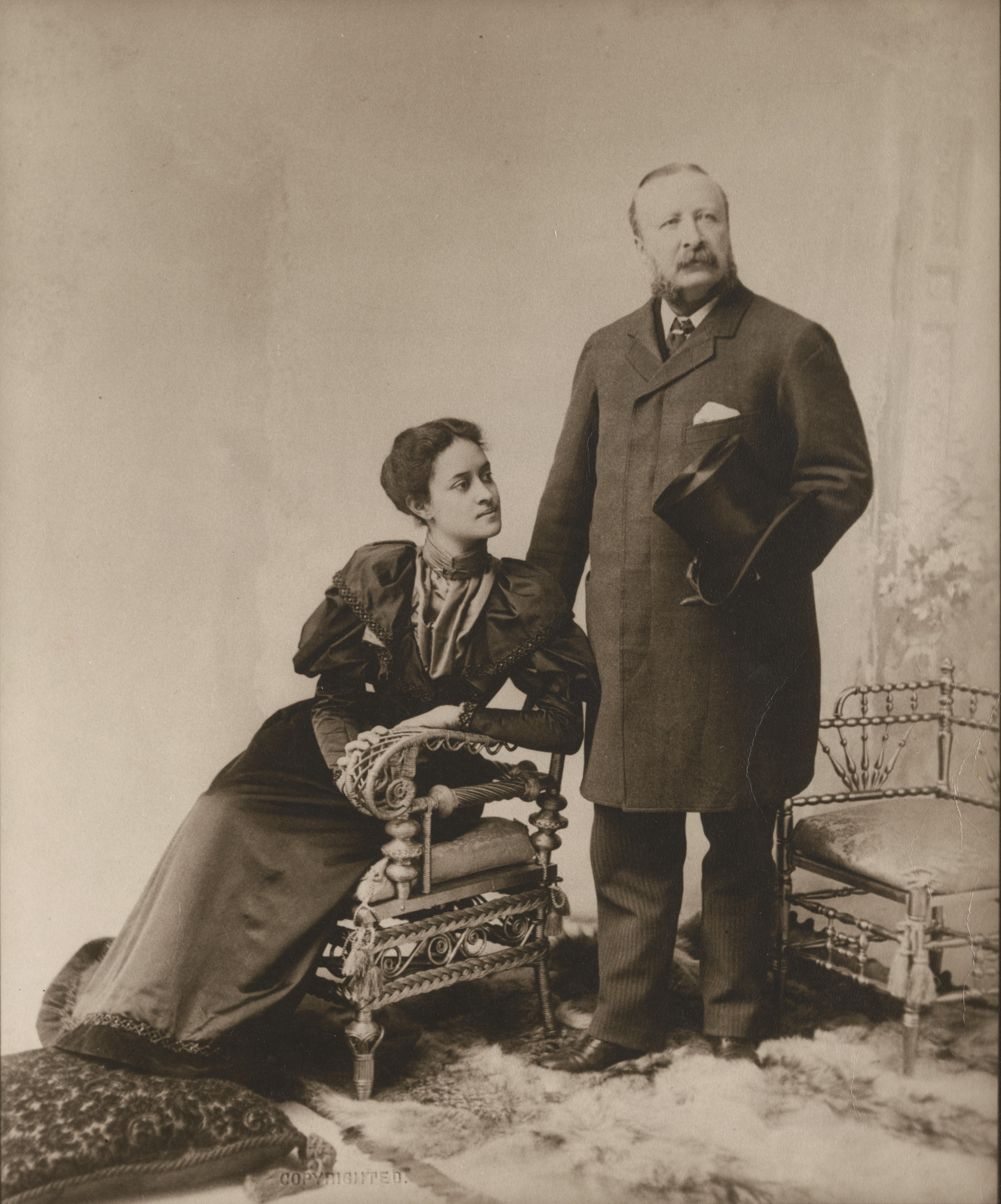
Princess Ka'iulani in Boston with Davies

== Life ==
Davies was born in Stourbridge, Worcestershire, England, the son of a Welsh minister and his English wife. He was recruited in England to join the firm of Janion, Green & Co. in Hawaii, a successor to Starkey, Janion & Co., formed in 1845. Partners were Robert Cheshire Janion and William Lowthian Green.

Davies arrived in 1857 but returned to England in 1862, where he stayed until 1867. He then returned to Honolulu, to bail out Janion. By January 1868, Davies controlled the business and it was being operated as Theo. H. Davies and Company.

His second son was George Frederick Davies (1875–1950) who served in Parliament. Another son Arthur Whitcliffe Davies (1878–1966), who became the Dean of Worcester, was born later that year in Honolulu. Another son, Harry Llanover Davies (1885–1914), was born in Honolulu but spent his adult life in Britain, becoming the first Hawaiian-born serviceman killed in combat during World War I.

Under the laws of the Provisional Government, it became Theo H. Davies & Co., Limited, in January 1894. It grew to become one of Hawaii's "Big Five" sugar firms. He acted as a guardian of Princess Kaʻiulani while she travelled to Europe and the United States. Davies died on 25 May 1898.
