= Kawānanakoa =

Kawānanakoa is a surname. Notable people with the name include:

- Abigail Campbell Kawānanakoa (1882–1945), a princess by marriage of the Kingdom of Hawaiʻi and politician of the state of Hawaii
- Abigail Kapiolani Kawānanakoa (1903–1961), a daughter of David Kawānanakoa and Abigail Campbell Kawānanakoa
- Abigail Kinoiki Kekaulike Kawānanakoa (1906–2022), daughter of Lydia Liliuokalani Kawānanakoa and adoptive daughter of Abigail Campbell Kawānanakoa
- David Kawānanakoa or Kahalepouli Kinoiki Kawānanakoa (1868–1908), a prince of the Kingdom of Hawaiʻi and founder of the House of Kawānanakoa
- David Kalākaua Kawānanakoa (1904–1953), also known as Prince Koke, a member of the House of Kawānanakoa and the only son of David Kawānanakoa and Abigail Campbell Kawānanakoa
- Edward A. Kawānanakoa (1924–1997), member of the House of Kawānanakoa
- Lydia Liliuokalani Kawānanakoa (1905–1969), a daughter of David Kawānanakoa and Abigail Campbell Kawānanakoa
- Quentin Kawānanakoa (born 1961), American politician of the state of Hawaii

== See also ==
- House of Kawānanakoa or the Kawānanakoa Dynasty, descendants of the royal family of the Kingdom of Hawaiʻi
