= Quentin Kawānanakoa =

American politician

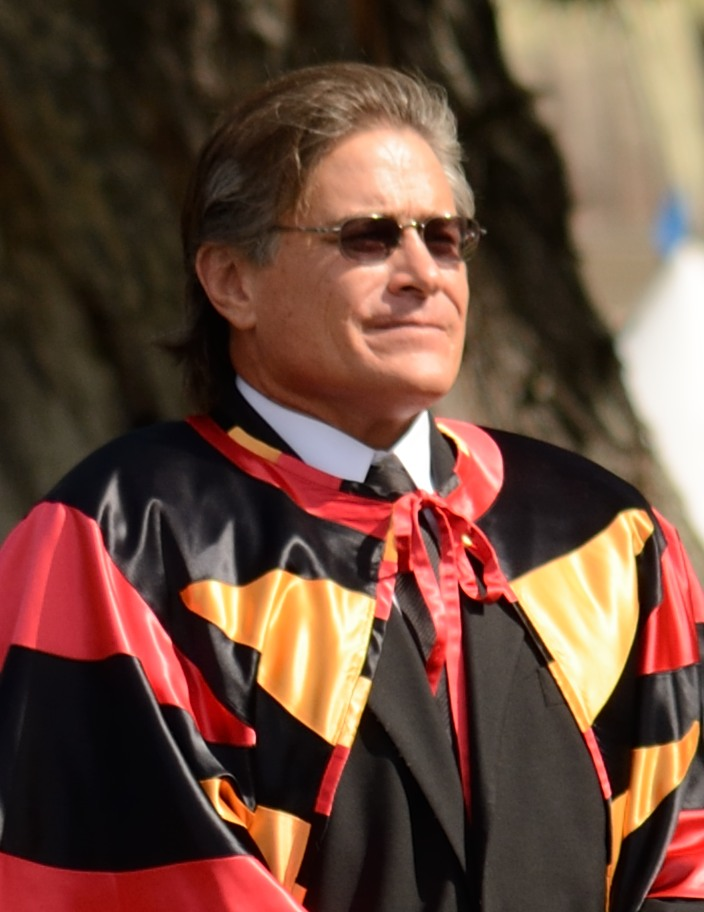
- Kawānanakoa in 2013

Head of the Royal House of Hawaii (disputed)
- Tenure: July 29, 1997 – present
- Predecessor: Edward A. Kawānanakoa
- Heir apparent: Kincaid Kawānanakoa

Member of the Hawaii House of Representatives from the 26th district
- In office January 1995 – January 1999
- Preceded by: Rod Tam
- Succeeded by: Sylvia Luke

Personal details
- Party: Republican
- Born: September 28, 1961 (age 65); Honolulu, Hawaii, U.S.
- Spouse: Elizabeth Broun (m. 1995; div. 2019)
- Issue: Kincaid Kawānanakoa; Riley Kawānanakoa
- House: Kawānanakoa
- Father: Edward A. Kawānanakoa
- Mother: Carolyn Willison Kawānanakoa

Quentin Kūhiō Kawānanakoa (born September 28, 1961) is an American politician and member of the House of Kawānanakoa. Kawānanakoa is an organizer of the Republican Party of Hawaii. He is also an heir to the James Campbell estate.

== Early years ==
Kawānanakoa was born September 28, 1961. He is the first son of his father Edward A. Kawānanakoa and his mother Carolyn Willison Kawānanakoa (though both parents had children with prior spouses). He was raised in Honolulu where he graduated from Punahou School. Kawānanakoa went on to study at the University of Southern California. He returned to Oʻahu and graduated from the William S. Richardson School of Law. Upon obtaining his Juris Doctor degree, he served in private practice at the law firm Case, Bigelow & Lombardi until 2000. He was a member of the inaugural 1997 class of the Pacific Century Fellows.

== Political life ==
In 1994, Kawānanakoa followed in his ancestors' footsteps and got involved in politics. Like his great-grandmother Abigail Campbell Kawānanakoa and great uncle Prince Jonah Kūhiō Kalanianaʻole, Kawānanakoa joined the Republican Party of Hawaii for its pro-business stance. He ran and won an election for the Hawai`i State House of Representatives, an office in which he served through 1998. He rose through the ranks of party leadership becoming minority floor leader. During an attempt to mount a challenge for the congressional seat held by Neil Abercrombie, Kawānanakoa abruptly retired from active political life after being hospitalized.

In April 2006, after eight years out of the public eye, Kawānanakoa announced his run for the congressional seat held by Ed Case, who chose not to run for U.S. Senate. He declared his candidacy on April 23, 2006. In the primary elections held on September 24, 2006, Kawānanakoa was narrowly defeated by State Senator Robert Hogue. The final vote total was Hogue: 8,393 votes (45.6%) vs. Kawānanakoa: 8,194 votes (44.5%). Senator Hogue went on to lose to Mazie Hirono in the general election.

In 2008, Kawānanakoa lost in a run for the Hawaii State House of Representatives. His opponent in the November 4, 2008, election was Democrat Chris Kalani Lee. Lee won with 5,885 votes to Kawānanakoa's 3,374 votes.

== Family ==
In September 1995, Kawānanakoa married Elizabeth Broun, a native of Jamaica. Their first child, Kincaid Kawānanakoa, was born in June 1997. In December 1999, their second child, Riley, was born. Quentin is the great-grandson of Prince David Kawānanakoa and Princess Abigail Campbell Kawānanakoa through his paternal grandmother Abigail Kapiolani Kawānanakoa. Another Abigail in the family, who died in December 2022, was considered the "last Hawaiian princess", though acknowledged that her cousin Edward (Quentin's father) would have been in line to the throne rather than her, had the monarchy continued.

On September 5, 2025, Kawānanakoa and his younger son Riley were among the Pacific Island dignitaries who attended the Koroneihana celebrations at Tūrangawaewae marae at the invitation of Māori Queen Nga wai hono i te po.

=== Tree ===
Kawānanakoa family tree

James Campbell (1826–1900)
Abigail Campbell; Kawānanakoa (1882–1945)
David Kalākaua; Kawānanakoa (1904–1953)
Edward A. Kawānanakoa (1924–1997)
Quentin Kawānanakoa (born 1961)
Kincaid Kawānanakoa (born 1997)

Abigail Kuaihelani; Campbell (1858–1908)	David Piʻikoi (1845–1878)
David Kawānanakoa (1868–1908)	Edward Abnel; Keliʻiahonui (1869–1887)
Abigail Kapiʻolani; Kawānanakoa (1903–1961)
Poʻomaikelani Kawānanakoa (1926–1998)	Esther Kapiʻolani, Marchesa Marignoli (1928–1985)
Riley Kawānanakoa (born 1999)

Victoria Kinoiki; Kekaulike (1843–1884)
Jonah Kūhiō; Kalanianaʻole (1871–1922) m. Elizabeth Kahanu; Kalanianaʻole (1879–1932)
Lydia Liliʻuokalani; Kawānanakoa (1905–1969)
Abigail K. K. Kawānanakoa (1926–2022)

Notes:

Hawaii House of Representatives
Preceded by Rod Tam	Member of the Hawaii House of Representatives from the 26th district 1995–1999	Succeeded by Sylvia Luke
