= Abigail Kawānanakoa =

Abigail Kawānanakoa may refer to:

- Abigail Campbell Kawānanakoa (1882–1945), Hawaiian princess
- Abigail Kapiʻolani Kawānanakoa (1903–1961), Hawaiian princess and daughter of Abigail Campbell Kawānanakoa
- Abigail Kinoiki Kekaulike Kawānanakoa (1926–2022), Hawaiian princess and granddaughter of Abigail Campbell Kawānanakoa
