= James Campbell (industrialist) =

Scots-Irish industrialist in Hawaiʻi (1826–1900)

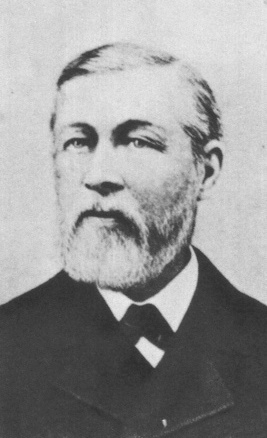
- One of the wealthiest landowners in Hawaiʻi
- Born: February 4, 1826; Derry, Ireland
- Died: April 21, 1900 (aged 74); Honolulu, Hawaii
- Occupation(s): Carpenter, Businessman
- Spouses: Hannah Barla; Abigail Kuaihelani Maipinepine
- Children: Abigail Campbell Kawānanakoa; Alice Kamokilaikawai Campbell + others
- Parent(s): William Campbell and Martha Adams

James Campbell, Esq. (February 4, 1826 – April 21, 1900) was a Scots-Irish industrialist in sugar cane processing, who became one of the largest landowners in the United States Territory of Hawaiʻi, and a real estate developer. He was an immigrant to Hawaiʻi from Ireland. At the age of 51, he married for a second time, to a young woman who was a daughter of Hawaiian aristocracy. They had eight children, four of whom survived to adulthood. One of their daughters married into the ruling family, and their grandchildren were heirs to the throne of the kingdom of Hawaii.

He established the Estate of James Campbell for his heirs, which continued for more than 100 years as one of the largest landowners in the islands. In 2007 more than 170 heirs agreed to rework it as the James Campbell Company; only three cashed out.

== Early years ==
James Campbell was born on February 4, 1826, to Scots-Irish William Campbell (1788–1879) and Martha Adams (1794–1871) in Derry, Ireland. Campbell was the eighth of twelve children. At the age of thirteen, Campbell boarded a ship leaving Ireland for Canada. He joined his brother John in New York City and worked for him. For two years in the United States, Campbell followed in his father's footsteps as a carpenter.

In 1841 he joined a whaling crew bound for the South Pacific; the vessel was shipwrecked in the Tuamotu Islands. Campbell and two shipmates were the only ones to survive by clinging onto debris and floating to a nearby island. They were captured by natives and held prisoner. Campbell persuaded the chief he could be useful by using his skill to make repairs, and their lives were spared. After a few months he escaped on a ship bound for Tahiti, where he settled and lived for several years.

== Lahaina, Maui ==
In 1850, the young Ulsterman boarded another whaling ship which reached the port of Lahaina on the Hawaiian island of Maui. Campbell took up carpentry again to make a living. In Lahaina he married Hannah Barla, who died in 1858, when he was about 32.

In 1860, Campbell formed a partnership with entrepreneurs Henry Turton and James Dunbar. They established a sugar-processing plant, Pioneer Mill Company. Dunbar sold out of the business early on. The partners also bought the Lahaina Sugar Company when it went bankrupt in 1863. With the boom in the sugar industry in the Kingdom of Hawaiʻi and high international demand, Campbell became one of the wealthiest people in Lahaina. He used his profits to purchase land on the islands of Oʻahu, Maui and the Big Island of Hawaiʻi.

In 1877, Campbell sold his interest in the Pioneer Mill for half a million dollars to Turton. The Pioneer Mill produced sugar until 1999.

== Family life ==
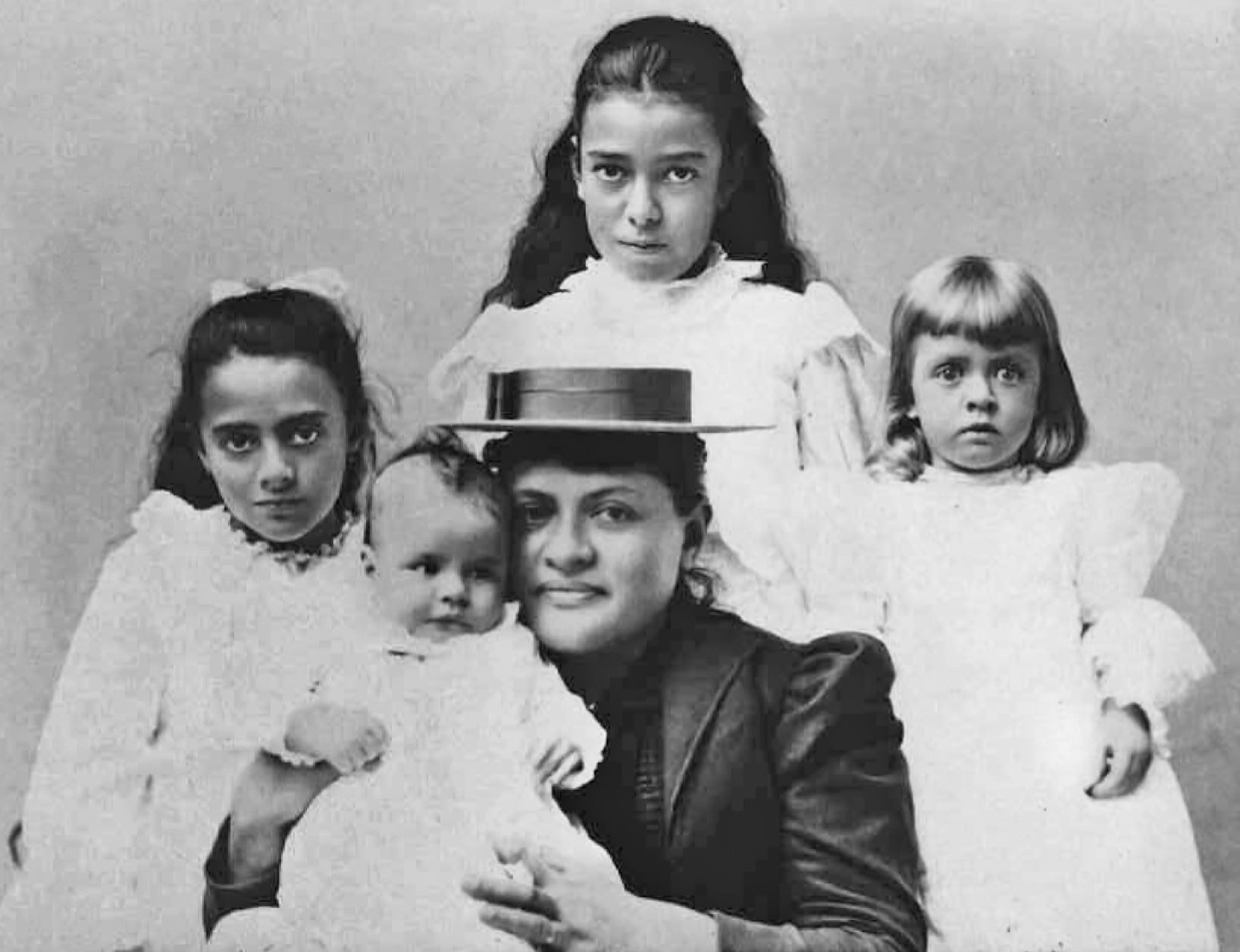
His wife and daughters

On October 30, 1877, the 51-year-old Campbell married 19-year-old Abigail Kuaihelani Maipinepine Bright (1859–1908), a Hawaiian woman of aristocratic family. (She had some Caucasian ancestry on her father's side.) In 1878 he bought a house in Honolulu from Archibald Scott Cleghorn. Cleghorn was brother-in-law to King Kalākaua. Victoria Kaʻiulani was born in that house.

The Campbells had four surviving children of eight born: Abigail, Alice Kamokilaikawai Campbell, Beatrice, and Muriel Campbell. Four other children, including a son James Campbell, Jr., died young. Abigail would marry Prince David Kawānanakoa of the reigning House of Kalākaua and assume the title of Princess of Hawaiʻi. They had three children: Princess Abigail Kapiʻolani Kawānanakoa, Prince David Kalākaua Kawānanakoa, and Princess Lydia Liliʻuokalani Kawānanakoa. These children would later become heirs to the throne of the Kingdom of Hawaiʻi as the House of Kawānanakoa.

== Land holdings ==
While raising his family, Campbell ventured into real estate with purchases of extensive parcels of land. One of his most controversial purchases was of flat, arid and barren 41,000 acres (166 km²) in the Ewa District of Oʻahu. Other businessmen criticized Campbell for making what appeared to be such a wasteful, unproductive investment and called him insane. In 1879 Campbell hired James Ashley of California to drill the first artesian well in Hawaii to use to irrigate his lands with fresh water. Campbell cultivated the land for sugarcane production and generated great profits from this property. Campbell continued to purchase underestimated plots of real estate and transformed them into productive agricultural districts.

He was appointed to serve in the House of Nobles (upper house of the legislature) in 1887 and 1888. He and his wife were loyal supporters of Queen Liliuokalani at the time of her overthrow by the United States in 1893.

In August 1896 while in San Francisco, Campbell was kidnapped by Oliver Winthrop, who pretended to be asking real estate advice. Winthrop and an unknown accomplice took $305 from him and threatened to shoot him if he did not write them a check for $20,000. After being held for two days without food or water and enduring several beatings, he refused any ransom. The 70-year-old Campbell was released. Winthrop never testified, but was found guilty at trial.

Campbell died on April 21, 1900, with US$3 million to his name, left in trust to his children and their heirs, and extensive property owned by his estate.

== Campbell Estate ==
Kapolei, a new suburb of Honolulu, was developed from part of the land in his estate. In 2004 his 176 beneficiaries decided to form the "James Campbell Company" to manage the real estate of the Campbell Estate. The conversion happened in January 2007, with only three family members cashing out.

== Legacy ==
What is now known as the James Campbell National Wildlife Refuge was leased from the estate in 1976. It was purchased and expanded in 2005.

James Campbell High School was named for him.

The James and Abigail Campbell Family Foundation was founded in 1980.

== Family tree ==
Kawānanakoa family tree

James Campbell (1826–1900)
Abigail Campbell; Kawānanakoa (1882–1945)
David Kalākaua; Kawānanakoa (1904–1953)
Edward A. Kawānanakoa (1924–1997)
Quentin Kawānanakoa (born 1961)

Abigail Kuaihelani; Campbell (1858–1908)	David Piʻikoi (1845–1878)
David Kawānanakoa (1868–1908)	Edward Abnel; Keliʻiahonui (1869–1887)
Abigail Kapiʻolani; Kawānanakoa (1903–1961)
Poʻomaikelani Kawānanakoa (1926–1998)	Esther Kapiʻolani, Marchesa Marignoli (1928–1985)

Victoria Kinoiki; Kekaulike (1843–1884)
Jonah Kūhiō; Kalanianaʻole (1871–1922) m. Elizabeth Kahanu; Kalanianaʻole (1879–1932)
Lydia Liliʻuokalani; Kawānanakoa (1905–1969)
Abigail K. K. Kawānanakoa (1926–2022)
