= Abigail Kuaihelani Campbell =

Princess of Hawai'i

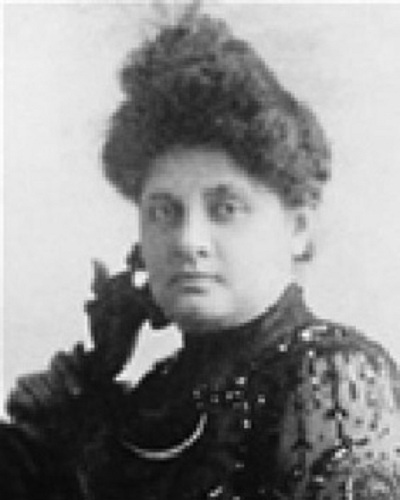
- Born: Abigail Kuaihelani Maipinepine Bright; August 22, 1858; Lahaina, Kingdom of Hawaii
- Died: November 1, 1908 (aged 50); Honolulu, Territory of Hawaii
- Occupation: Political leader
- Spouses: James Campbell; Samuel Parker
- Children: Abigail Campbell Kawānanakoa; Alice Kamokilaikawai Campbell + others
- Parent(s): John Isaac Maipinepine Bright; Mary Kamai Hanaike

Signature
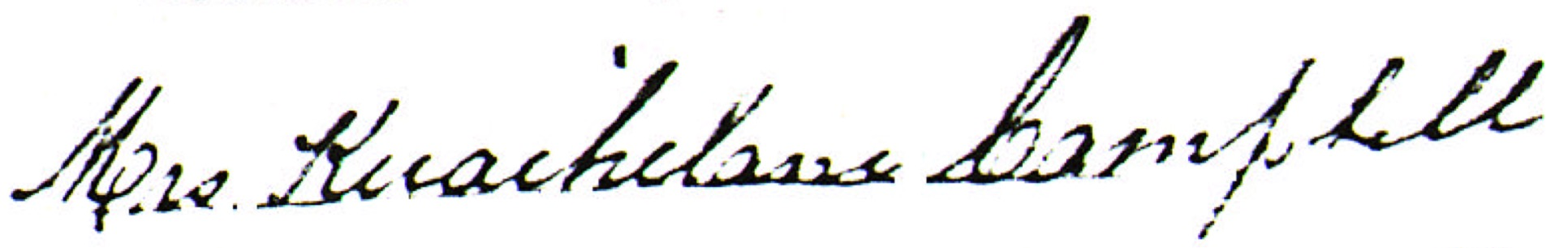

Abigail Kuaihelani Maipinepine Bright Campbell (August 22, 1858 – November 1, 1908) was a member of the nobility of the Kingdom of Hawaii. During her life, she married two powerful businessmen, particularly adding to the success of her first husband, James Campbell, and giving him descendants. Among their grandchildren were three heirs to the throne of the kingdom of Hawaii.

== Early life and family ==
Abigail Kuaihelani Maipinepine Bright was born on August 22, 1858, on Lahaina, Maui. Her mother was Mary Kamai Hanaike and her father was John Isaac Maipinepine Bright. She is descended from the Kalanikini line of Maui chieftains, with some European-American ancestry on her father's side.

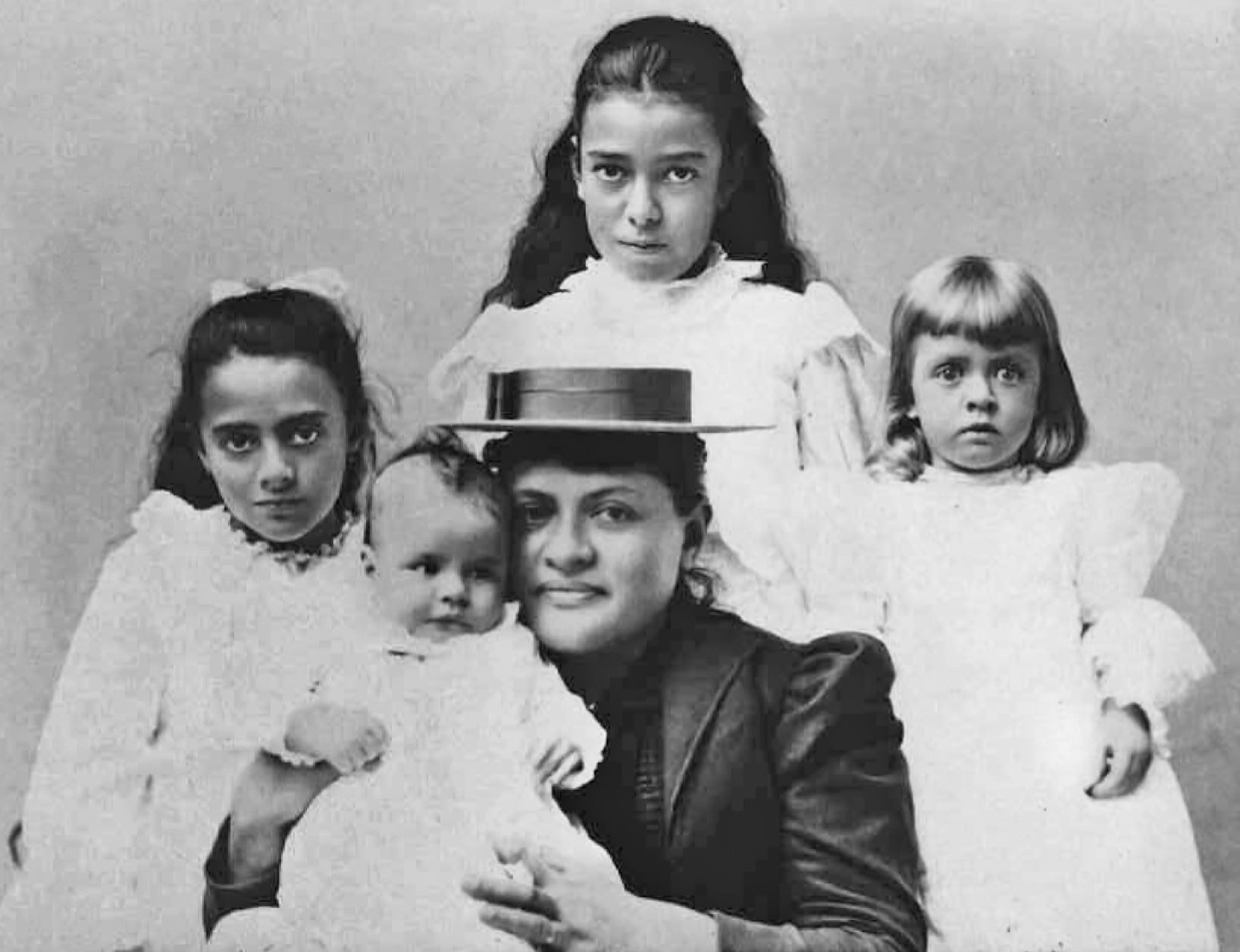
Abigail and daughters.

On October 30, 1877, she married Scotch-Irish American businessman James Campbell (1826–1900), who became one of the largest landowners in the islands. Their children were Margaret (1880–1882); Abigail (1882–1945), who became better-known as Abigail Campbell Kawānanakoa after marrying a Hawaiian prince; Alice Kamokilaikawai Campbell (1884–1971); James, Jr. (1886–1889); Muriel (Mrs. Robert K.) Shingle (1890–1951); Royalist (1893–1896); and Beatrice (Mrs. Francis) Wrigley.

Daughter Alice Kamokila Campbell became active in the anti-statehood movement after the United States annexed Hawaiʻi, making it a Territory. Daughter Margaret, son James Campbell, Jr. and two other daughters died young. James Campbell, Sr. died in 1900 and bequeathed his widow one-third of the estate during her lifetime.

== President of Hui Aloha ʻĀina ==
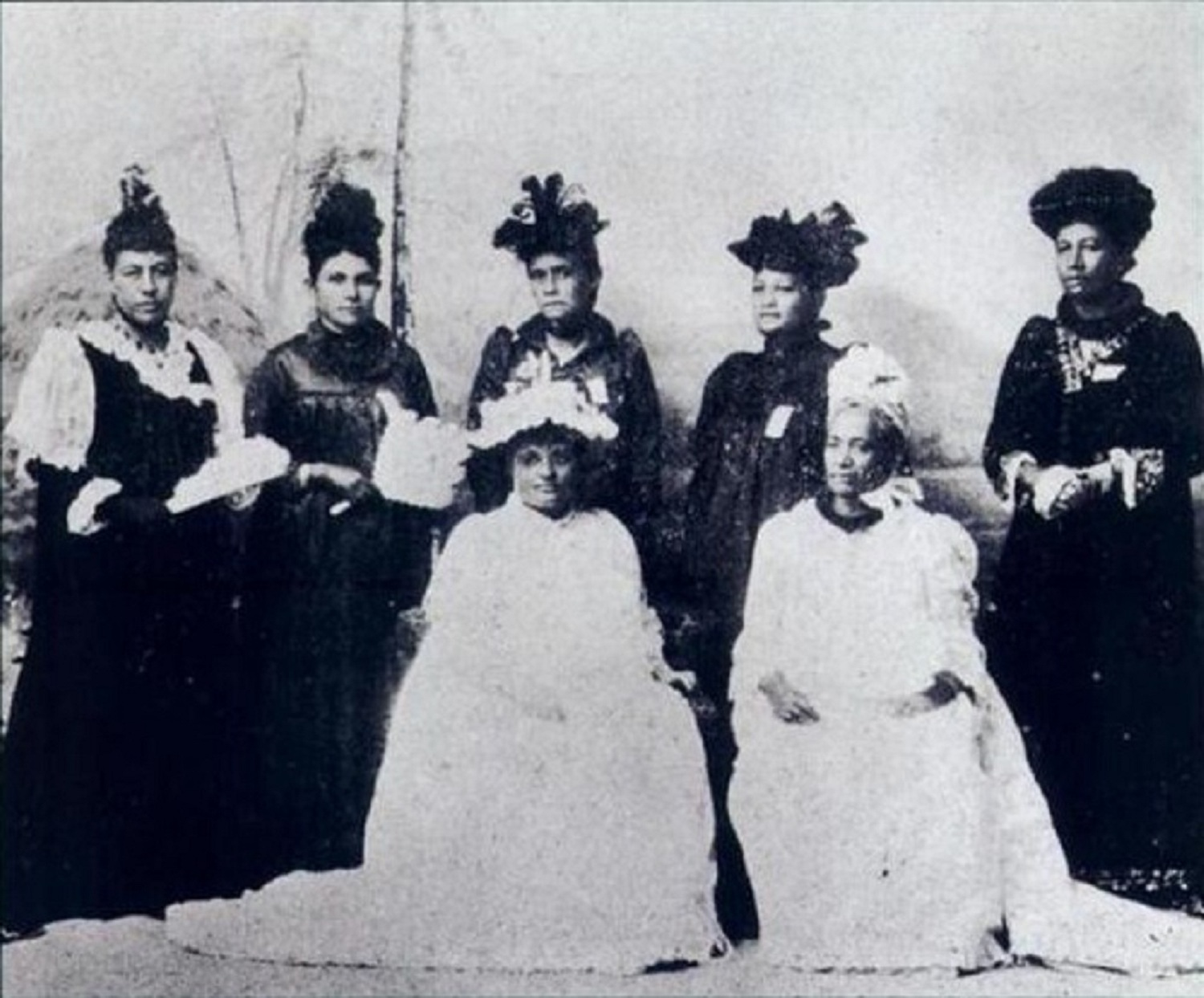
The Hui Aloha ʻĀina o Na Wahine, 1893

After the 1893 overthrow of the Kingdom of Hawaii, Abigail Campbell and Emma Nāwahī, wife of Joseph Nāwahī, became leaders of the Hawaiian native movement for protesting the takeover, called Hui Hawaiʻi Aloha ʻĀina o Na Wahine (Hawaiian Women's Patriot League). She became the second president of the organization.

== Second marriage ==
On January 4, 1902, widow Abigail Kuaihelani Campbell married widower Samuel Parker, half owner of Parker Ranch. They had a private ceremony in the Occidental Hotel of San Francisco with a judge presiding. The Campbell estate owned the St. James Hotel in San Jose, California. At the time, Abigail Campbell was also preparing to celebrate the wedding of her daughter Abigail to Prince David Kawānanakoa, which took place two days later. The Parkers traveled to Washington, D.C. They returned to California February 2, 1902; it was rumored that Parker would be appointed as the next governor of the Territory of Hawaii. George R. Carter was appointed instead. They had no children.

== Death and legacy ==
Campbell-Parker died November 1, 1908, aged 50, following breast cancer surgery.

On November 1, 2018, Punahou School named the Kuaihelani Learning Center after her.

== Family tree ==
Kawānanakoa family tree

James Campbell (1826–1900)
Abigail Campbell; Kawānanakoa (1882–1945)
David Kalākaua; Kawānanakoa (1904–1953)
Edward A. Kawānanakoa (1924–1997)
Quentin Kawānanakoa (born 1961)
Kincaid Kawānanakoa (born 1997)

Abigail Kuaihelani; Campbell (1858–1908)	David Piʻikoi (1845–1878)
David Kawānanakoa (1868–1908)	Edward Abnel; Keliʻiahonui (1869–1887)
Abigail Kapiʻolani; Kawānanakoa (1903–1961)
Poʻomaikelani Kawānanakoa (1926–1998)	Esther Kapiʻolani, Marchesa Marignoli (1928–1985)
Riley Kawānanakoa (born 1999)

Victoria Kinoiki; Kekaulike (1843–1884)
Jonah Kūhiō; Kalanianaʻole (1871–1922) m. Elizabeth Kahanu; Kalanianaʻole (1879–1932)
Lydia Liliʻuokalani; Kawānanakoa (1905–1969)
Abigail K. K. Kawānanakoa (1926–2022)
