= Harry Field (American football) =

American football player and politician (1911–1964)

No. 31
- Position: Tackle

Personal information
- Born: August 18, 1911; Wailuku, Hawaii Territory, U.S.
- Died: May 23, 1964 (aged 52); Honolulu, Hawaii, U.S.
- Listed height: 6 ft 1 in (1.85 m)
- Listed weight: 226 lb (103 kg)

Career information
- High school: Punahou (Honolulu, Hawaii)
- College: Hawaii, Oregon State

Career history

Playing
- Chicago Cardinals (1934–1936); Los Angeles Bulldogs (AFL, 1937)

Coaching
- Punahou (1941–1950) (head coach)

Awards and highlights
- All-Pro second team (1934)

Career statistics
- Games played: 33
- Starts: 27
- Stats at Pro Football Reference

Henry Montague Norman Nuuanu Gooding Field (August 18, 1911 – May 23, 1964) was an American football tackle who played professionally for the Chicago Cardinals of the National Football League (NFL) from 1934 to 1936. In later life, he was elected and served in the Hawaii State Senate from 1963 to 1964. He was inducted into the Polynesian Football Hall of Fame in 2023.

== Biography ==
=== Early life ===
Born in Wailuku on the Hawaiian island of Maui, his parents were William Herbert Field and Margaret Rebecca Nape Field (died 1943). His father was a British immigrant to the Hawaiian Kingdom in the 1880s who operated the Maui Hotel until 1927 while his mother was of Native Hawaiian descent with links to ruling families of the aliʻi nui (paramount chiefs) of Maui. His uncle was the Hawaiian composer David Nape.

From 1927 to 1930, Field attended Punahou School in Honolulu where he excelled in football, track and swimming. He was captain of the Punahou football team in 1929. He also surfed and paddled with Duke Kahanamoku and won the Outrigger Canoe Club regatta race three years in a row from 1927 to 1931.

=== Football career ===
Field as a member of the Chicago Cardinals in 1936.

After playing a year of college football at the University of Hawaii, he transferred to and played at Oregon State University from 1932 until 1934.

Field was a starter on the legendary 1933 Oregon State Beavers football team that battled the back-to-back national champion and undefeated USC Trojans to a scoreless tie using just eleven "Iron Men" players for the entire duration of the game. Afterwards, the "225-pound Hawaiian" Field was reckoned by a Los Angeles Times reporter to be "tougher than a cafeteria steak" in helping OSC to stay the Southern California juggernaut.

Professionally, he played in 34 games over three seasons for the Chicago Cardinals from 1934 to 1936 and the Los Angeles Bulldogs (AFL) in 1937. Field was chosen as a second-team All-NFL member in his rookie season in 1934 by the Chicago Daily News and the United Press.

=== Personal life ===
Field returned to Hawaii in the 1940s after a short stint in the film industry where he played minor roles. He coached the Punahou football team from 1941 to 1950. During the attack on Pearl Harbor, his team was on Maui and performed ROTC duties, patrolling the coast of Maui for three weeks before returning to Honolulu.

In 1944, Field married Princess Abigail Kapiolani Kawānanakoa, a descendant of Hawaiian royalty and daughter of Prince David Kawānanakoa and Princess Abigail Campbell Kawānanakoa. After her death in 1961 there were plans to bury her at a new burial plot at the Royal Mausoleum at Mauna ʻAla where her brother (the last member of the family to be interred here) and parents were buried alongside the last ruling members of the House of Kalākaua. However, Field felt uncomfortable about the prospect of being buried at the Royal Mausoleum alongside her after his own death. Instead he had her buried in the Oahu Cemetery on the Kawānanakoa family plot. After his death, Field was buried next to his wife at the Oahu Cemetery.

=== Political career ===
Field served as a state senator from Maui in the Hawaii State Legislature from 1963 to his death in 1964. He was a Democrat. George Ariyoshi, later elected as Governor of Hawaii from 1973 to 1986, served in the senate with Field. Ariyoshi noted: "He was courageous, intelligent, and caring. If he had lived he would have been one of the leaders of modern Hawaii."

=== Legacy ===
In 1980, Field was recognized as an inductee of Athletic Hall of Fame for football, track and swimming at Punahou School, representing the class of 1930. He was also a 2021 finalist for induction into the Polynesian Football Hall of Fame. He was inducted in 2023.
