= Alice Kamokilaikawai Campbell =

Hawaiian politician

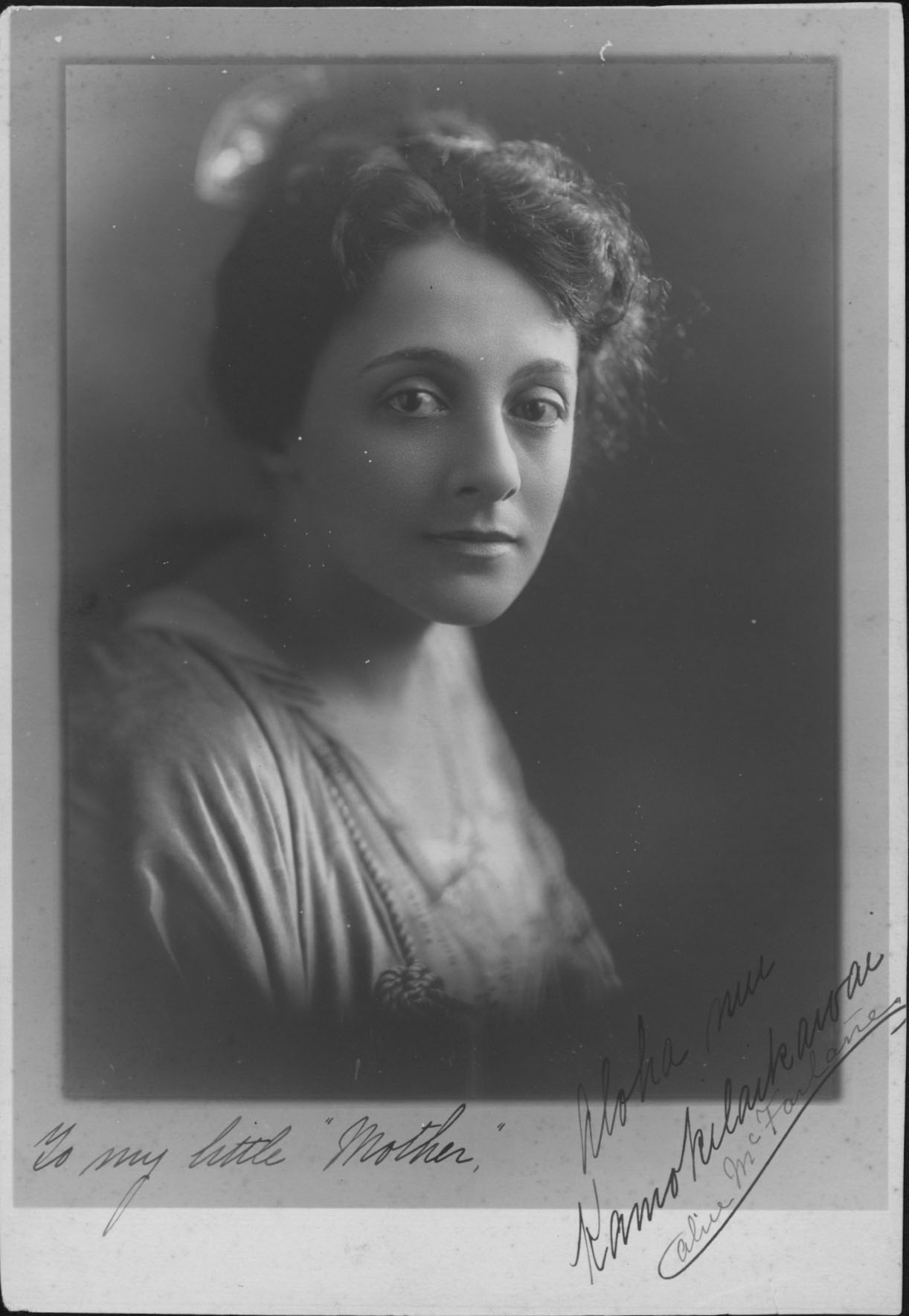
- Born: March 17, 1884; Honolulu, Kingdom of Hawaii
- Died: October 23, 1971 (aged 87); Menlo Park, California
- Occupation: Political leader

Alice Kamokilaikawai Campbell, also known as Kamokila Campbell or simply Kamokila, (March 17, 1884 – October 23, 1971) was a territorial Senator of Hawaiʻi from 1942 to 1946. She was a leading opponent of Hawaiian statehood, arguing that Hawaiians should not "forfeit the traditional rights and privileges of the natives of our islands for a mere thimbleful of votes in Congress." After her political career, she was dedicated to sharing moʻolelo, the traditional stories of the native Hawaiians.

== Early life and family ==
Alice Kamokilaikawai Campbell was born in Honolulu on March 17, 1884. She was born into an elite family: her father James Campbell was a wealthy industrialist, and her mother Abigail Kuaihelani Campbell was a descendant of Hawaiian nobility. When Alice was a child, her family were friends with Queen Liliʻuokalani and she would play at the ʻIolani Palace. After her father's death, she inherited part of the Campbell Estate, one of the largest in the Hawaiian islands.

Campbell married sugar planter Walter Macfarlane; they had five children, including waterman Walter J. Macfarlane and composer Muriel Macfarlane Flanders. After twenty-five years of marriage, they divorced in 1929. She would go on to marry twice more.

Campbell attended the College of Notre Dame in San Jose, California. She ran a French supper club in San Francisco in the 1930s, but returned to Hawai'i in 1939.

"Club Kamokila was located at 960 Bush St., in San Francisco. Founded in 1933 by pineapple heiress Alice Kamokila Campbell, it was originally called Kamokila's Temple to Art. The temple was the auditorium, as the building was former church that became a speakeasy. Legal issues arose after the club was raided for unlawful liquor sales, and Campbell closed the club in April of 1934, & moved back to Hawaii. It was then taken over by Kamehameha Corporation, and renamed the Royal Hawaiian."

== Political career ==
Campbell's mother had been one of the leaders opposing annexation of Hawai'i in the 1890s, establishing the organization Hui Hawaiʻi Aloha ʻĀina o Na Wahine to promote Hawaiian independence, and her sister Princess Abigail Kawānanakoa was a leader for native Hawaiians in her role as a member by marriage of the former Hawaiian royal family and a Republican national committeewoman. After her sister's death, Campbell took over her leadership role in speaking for the rights of native Hawaiians.

Campbell served as the Democratic senator for the Maui-Moloka'i district in the territorial Senate from 1942 to 1946. In 1943 she became Democratic national committeewoman.

At a U.S. Congressional Committee hearing at the ʻIolani Palace in January 1946, Campbell testified:

I do not feel [...] we should forfeit the traditional rights and privileges of the natives of our islands for a mere thimbleful of votes in Congress, that we, the lovers of Hawaiʻi from long association with it should sacrifice our birthright for the greed of alien desires to remain on our shores, that we should satisfy the thirst for power and control of some inflated industrialists and politicians who hide under the guise of friends of Hawaiʻi, yet still keeping an eagle eye on the financial and political pressure button of subjugation over the people in general of these islands.

Campbell spoke for over two hours, advocating for Hawaiian self-governance and protesting the economic control the Big Five corporations had over the islands. After her testimony, media coverage was primarily negative, attacking Campbell's arguments as emotional and illogical, as well as critiquing her negative comments towards Japanese Americans when she cast aspersions on their loyalty. Throughout her campaign against statehood, Campbell would shift her arguments from demanding independence to advocating for commonwealth status. In September 1947, she opened the "Anti-Statehood Clearing House," collecting testimony from Hawaiians opposed to statehood to send to Congressmembers.

In January 1948, Campbell filed a lawsuit challenging the legality of the Hawaiʻi Statehood Commission's financing (Campbell v. Stainback et al.). The Hawaiʻi Supreme Court ruled unanimously in her favor saying that public funds could not be used for lobbying and publicity for statehood.

Her political career suffered because of her outspoken criticism of the powerful corporations of the Big Five. She unsuccessfully ran for reelection in 1948, 1954, and 1958. In February 1960 Campbell reported to the Hawaiʻi State Senate that Pele had appeared to her in a vision, and that the goddess had asked, "Now that we are at the crisis of our destiny are we to fall into oblivion?"; the remarks were entered into the official Hawaiʻi State Senate record.

== Later life and death ==
During and after her political career, Campbell worked to keep the traditions of the native Hawaiians alive. She recorded dramatic readings of moʻolelo (traditional narrative stories) along with the original music compositions of Jack de Mello. Together, they recorded an album, Kamokila: Legends of Hawaiʻi.

She left Hawaiʻi in the 1960s to live near her sons in California. She died in Menlo Park, California, on October 23, 1971.

== Residence ==
Property purchased in 1877 by Alice's father, James Campbell, later became her residence for over thirty years. Campbell chose the beachfront property to become her home in 1939, living there with her family in a thatched Hawaiian hale and tropical surroundings. She named the property Lanikūhonua, Hawaiian for "where heaven meets the earth." During World War II, it was estimated 350,000 servicemen visited her estate for entertainment and relaxation.

After Campbell's death, half of the site was developed into the Paradise Cove Luau. In 2021 the James Campbell Company announced that the 11-acre Paradise Cove property would be redeveloped to include a luau, restaurants, and retail stores.
