= House of Kawānanakoa =

Descendants to the throne of the Kingdom of Hawaiʻi

- Royal family
- Coat of arms of the Kingdom of Hawaii
- Parent house: House of Kalākaua
- Country: Hawaii; United States
- Founded: 1893; 133 years ago
- Founder: David Kawānanakoa
- Current head: Quentin Kawānanakoa
- Estate: ʻIolani Palace

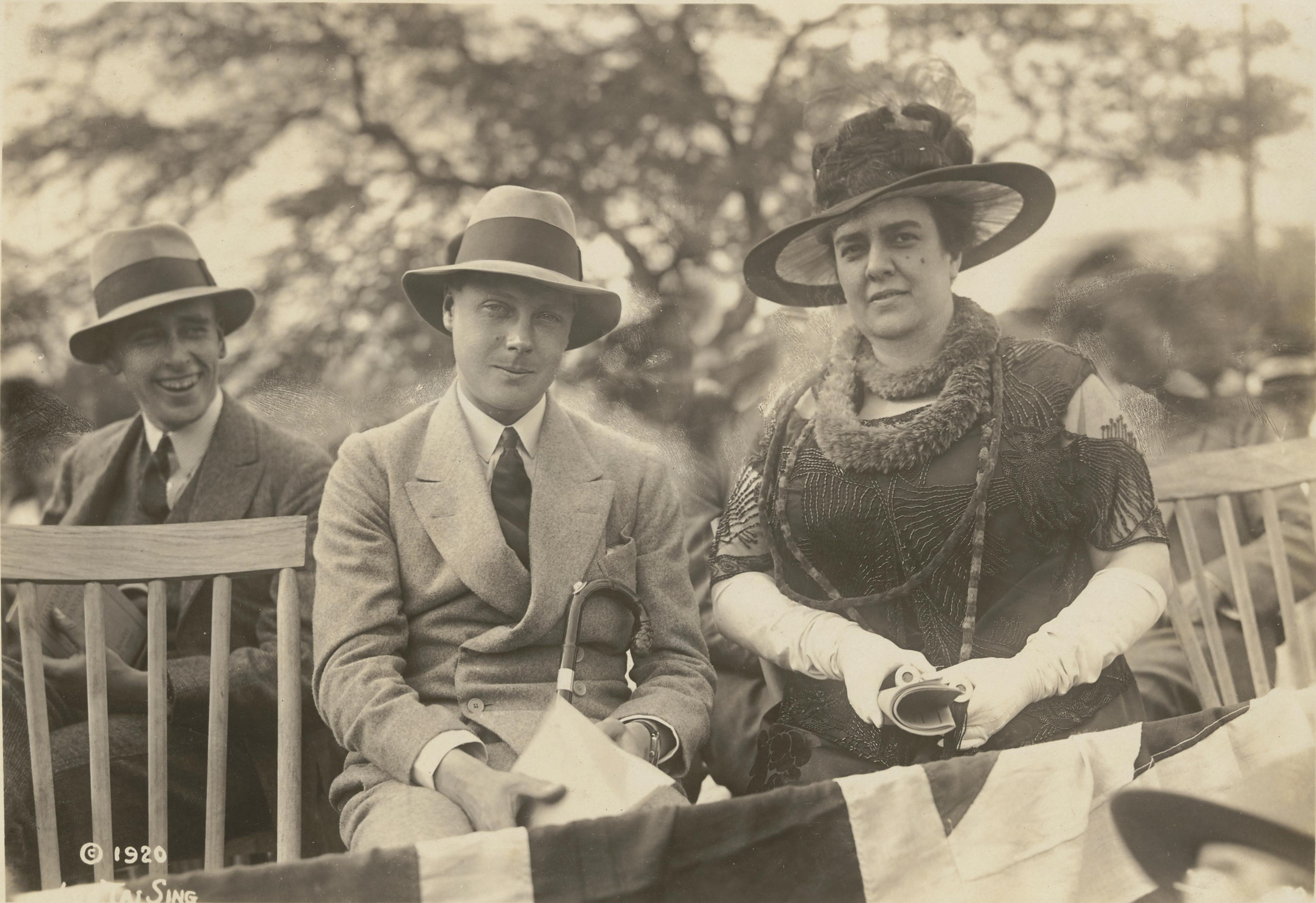
Abigail Campbell Kawānanakoa socializes with Edward, Prince of Wales, future King Edward VIII in 1920

The House of Kawānanakoa, also known as the Kawānanakoa Dynasty, is a Hawaiian royal house and cadet branch of the House of Kalākaua. It descends from Prince David Kawānanakoa, who was designated an heir to the throne during the reign of Kalākaua and later recognized as a leading claimant to the crown after the overthrow of the Kingdom of Hawaiʻi in 1893. The house has since represented one of the principal surviving dynastic lines associated with the former Hawaiian monarchy.

Members of the family are descended from both Native Hawaiian high chiefs and prominent political families of the kingdom, linking the line to the traditional aliʻi nobility as well as the modern constitutional monarchy established in the nineteenth century. Through marriage and ancestry, the house also maintained connections with influential families in Hawaiʻi and abroad.

Although the monarchy was abolished following the annexation of Hawaiʻi by the United States, the House of Kawānanakoa continued to hold cultural and symbolic significance among monarchists and supporters of Hawaiian heritage. In the twentieth and twenty-first centuries, members of the dynasty remained prominent in philanthropy, cultural preservation, and public life, most notably Abigail Kawānanakoa, who was widely regarded by some as a pretender to the Hawaiian throne. While the current claimant to the throne of Hawaii is disputed, Quentin Kawānanakoa is considered to be the most accepted titular head of the throne of Hawaii.

Today, the House of Kawānanakoa remains an important symbol of the legacy of the Hawaiian Kingdom and the continuity of its royal traditions.

== Origins ==
A collateral branch of the reigning House of Kalākaua (from Kauaʻi island) and descendants of chiefs of areas such as Waimea on Hawaiʻi island, the dynastic line was established by Prince David Kawānanakoa who was declared an heir to King David Kalākaua. He was the son of High Chief David Kahalepouli Piʻikoi and High Chiefess Victoria Kinoiki Kekaulike. Kawānanakoa was engaged to Princess Victoria Kaʻiulani on February 3, 1898, who would have become a monarch in her own right upon the death of Queen Liliʻuokalani had she not predeceased her.

David Kawānanakoa's paternal ancestry comes from a cadet branch of the Kauaʻi royal family. His paternal grandmother High Chiefess Kekahili was a half-sister of High Chief Caesar Kapaʻakea, the father of Kalākaua, both being children of the Chiefess Kamokuiki. This made her an aunt of King Kalākaua and Queen Liliʻuokalani, which makes the Kawānanakoas the closest surviving collateral relatives of the formerly reigning Kalākaua house. The said grandmother descended, besides from the ancient line of chiefs of Kauaʻi, also from the chief of Kaʻū, a great-uncle of King Kamehameha I.

However, the higher ranking ancestry of David Kawānanakoa actually is that through his mother. His maternal grandmother High Chiefess Kekaulike Kinoiki was the daughter of the last king of Kauaʻi and Niʻihau Kaumualiʻi. She was the granddaughter of Kaneoneo, who attempted to take Oʻahu back from Kahekili II in rebellion. She descended from the lines of high chiefs of Niʻihau, Koloa, Oʻahu, Kauaʻi and Maui. His maternal grandfather High Chief Kūhiō Kalanianaʻole was a descendant of several chiefly lines of the districts of the island of Hawaiʻi (such as Waimea, Kona and Hilo) and descended directly from the chief of Waimea.

The House of Kawānanakoa survives today and in 1998 were believed to be heirs to the throne by a number of genealogists. Members of the family are sometimes called prince and princess, as a matter of tradition and respect of their status as aliʻi or chiefs of native Hawaiians, being lines of ancient ancestry.

In 1900, David Kawānanakoa was one of the founders of the Democratic Party of Hawaii. The House of Kawānanakoa in contemporary Hawaiian politics is closely aligned with the Hawaii Republican Party, a political party it helped organize since the creation of the Territory of Hawaiʻi. House matriarch, Abigail Kawānanakoa, became a national party leader in the early years of the twentieth century.

== Family tree ==
Kawānanakoa family tree

James Campbell (1826–1900)
Abigail Campbell; Kawānanakoa (1882–1945)
David Kalākaua; Kawānanakoa (1904–1953)
Edward A. Kawānanakoa (1924–1997)
Quentin Kawānanakoa (born 1961)
Kincaid Kawānanakoa (born 1997)

Abigail Kuaihelani; Campbell (1858–1908)	David Piʻikoi (1845–1878)
David Kawānanakoa (1868–1908)	Edward Abnel; Keliʻiahonui (1869–1887)
Abigail Kapiʻolani; Kawānanakoa (1903–1961)
Poʻomaikelani Kawānanakoa (1926–1998)	Esther Kapiʻolani, Marchesa Marignoli (1928–1985)
Riley Kawānanakoa (born 1999)

Victoria Kinoiki; Kekaulike (1843–1884)
Jonah Kūhiō; Kalanianaʻole (1871–1922) m. Elizabeth Kahanu; Kalanianaʻole (1879–1932)
Lydia Liliʻuokalani; Kawānanakoa (1905–1969)
Abigail K. K. Kawānanakoa (1926–2022)
