= Edward A. Kawānanakoa =

Pretender to the Hawaiian throne

Head of the Royal House of Hawaii (disputed)
- Tenure: April 8, 1961 – July 29, 1997
- Predecessor: Abigail Kapiʻolani Kawānanakoa
- Successor: Quentin Kawānanakoa
- Born: October 2, 1924; San Francisco, California, US
- Died: July 29, 1997 (aged 72); Honolulu, Hawaii, US
- Burial: Oahu Cemetery
- Spouse: Lila de Clark Whitaker; Carolyn Willison Branch
- Issue: 5
- Father: Andrew Anderson Lambert
- Mother: Abigail Kapiolani Kawānanakoa

The young Prince Edward A. Kawānanakoa wearing the feather mahiole and ʻahuʻula of his ancestor, King Kaumualiʻi in 1947.

Edward Abnel Keli'iahonui Kawānanakoa (October 2, 1924 – July 29, 1997) was a member of the House of Kawānanakoa.

== Life ==
He was born October 2, 1924, to Abigail Kawānanakoa and her first husband, Andrew Anderson Lambert, in San Francisco, California. He was named after his great-uncle Prince Edward Abnel Keliʻiahonui who died at a young age.

His grandfather David Kawānanakoa (1868–1908) was officially named as one of the heirs to King David Kalākaua in his will. Although many in the native Hawaiian community considered him the heir to the throne, he considered himself an American citizen. As one of several heirs to the estate of his great-grandfather James Campbell, he often donated to community charities. He graduated from Punahou School and then left in 1942 for Menlo College. While in California, he joined the Army Air Corps and served as a pilot in World War II. He rejected an appointment to the United States Military Academy and instead obtained a degree from the University of Southern California.

In 1946, Kawānanakoa married Lila de Clark Whitaker. In 1960, the couple were divorced. The next year, Kawānanakoa married again to Carolyn Branch and had two children of their own. On July 29, 1997, Kawānanakoa died and was survived by his wife, eight children and his two sisters, Virginia Poomaikelani Kawānanakoa and Esther Kapiolani Kawānanakoa and cousin Abigail Kinoiki Kekaulike Kawānanakoa. He was buried at the Oahu Cemetery.

== Children ==
- Regina Kawānanakoa (1947–2016)
- Edward A. K. Kawānanakoa Jr. (1949–2020)
- David Klaren Kawānanakoa II (1952–2025)
- Quentin Kawānanakoa (b. 1961)
- Andrew Piʻikoi Kawānanakoa (b. 1964)
- Travis Branch (stepson)
- Corey Branch (stepson)
- Young Elena Branch (stepdaughter)

== See also ==
- ʻIolani Palace
- Kawānanakoa family tree
