= Abigail Kinoiki Kekaulike Kawānanakoa =

Hawaiian princess and rancher (1926–2022)

Abigail Kawānanakoa
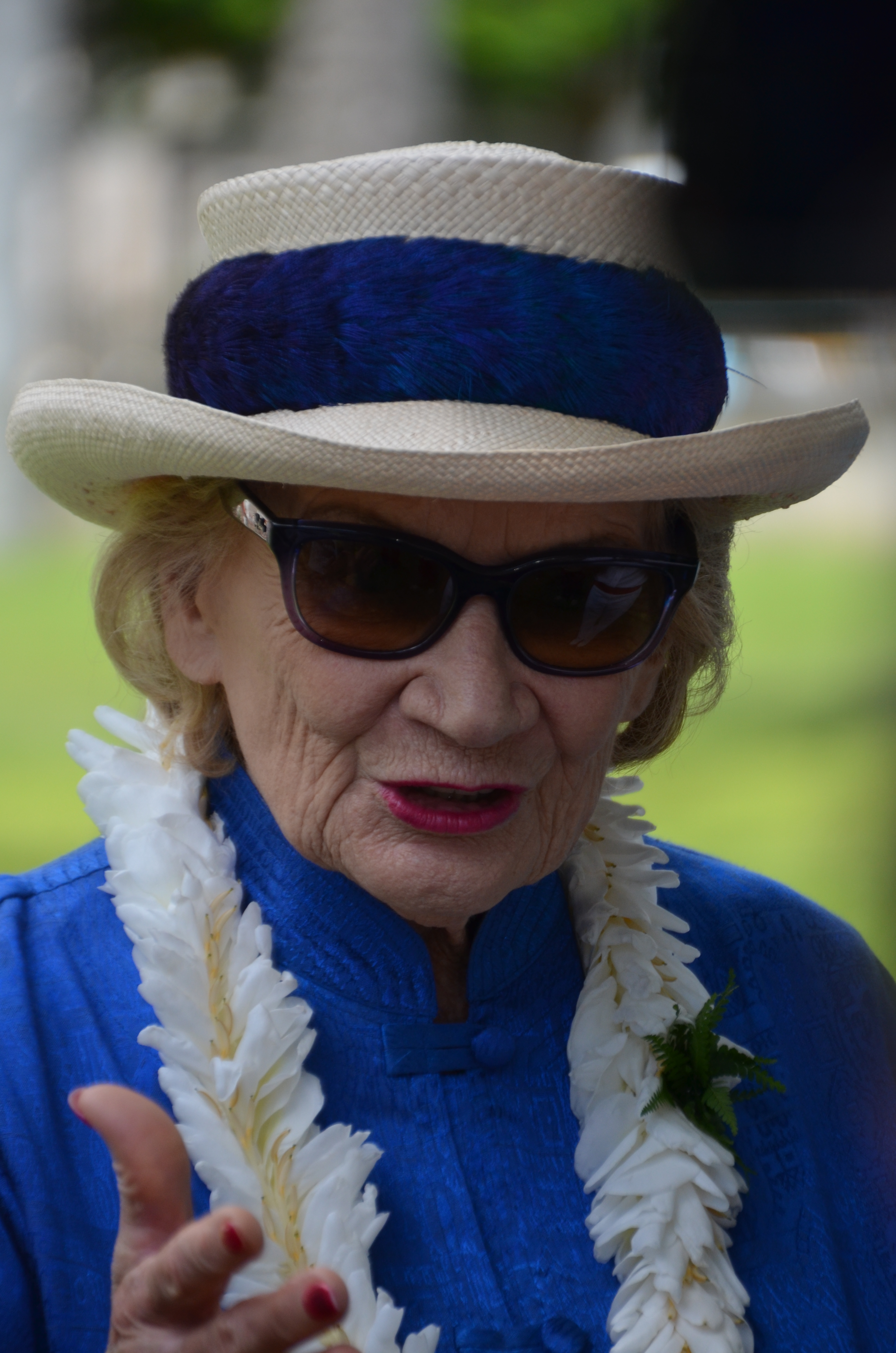
- Kawānanakoa in 2012
- Born: Abigail Kinoiki Kekaulike Kawānanakoa; April 23, 1926; Honolulu, Oahu, Territory of Hawaii
- Died: December 11, 2022 (aged 96); Honolulu, Hawaii, U.S.
- Resting place: Royal Mausoleum, Mauna ʻAla
- Occupations: Rancher; equestrian; philanthropist
- Spouse: Veronica Gail Worth (m. 2017)
- Parents: William Jeremiah Ellerbrock (father); Lydia Liliuokalani Kawānanakoa (biological mother); Abigail Campbell Kawānanakoa (adoptive mother)
- Family: Kawānanakoa

Abigail Kinoiki Kekaulike Kawānanakoa (April 23, 1926 – December 11, 2022), also known as Princess Abigail Kawānanakoa and sometimes called Kekau, was a Native Hawaiian-American heiress, equestrian, philanthropist and supporter of Native Hawaiian heritage, culture and arts, who was born during the Territorial Period of Hawaii as a descendant of the Hawaiian royal family from the House of Kawānanakoa.

== Birth and early life ==
Kawānanakoa was the only child of Lydia Liliuokalani Kawānanakoa, born during her marriage to Irish-American Dr. William Jeremiah Ellerbrock. She was a descendant of Aliʻi Kaumualiʻi, the final independent ruler of Kauaʻi and Niʻihau. Kawānanakoa was educated at Punahou School in Honolulu, the Shanghai American School in Shanghai from 1938 to 1939, and Notre Dame High School in Belmont, California, from which she graduated in 1943. She attended Dominican College in San Rafael, California, from 1943 to 1944, and studied at the University of Hawaii in 1945.

=== Line of succession to the throne of Hawaii ===
The Kingdom of Hawaii's last two monarchs, Kalākaua and Liliʻuokalani were childless. Because of this, both monarchs named family members as heirs, including Princess Victoria Kaʻiulani, the daughter of Princess Miriam Likelike, sister of the two rulers.

At the age of six, she was legally adopted by her grandmother, Princess Abigail Campbell Kawānanakoa, in the Hawaiian tradition of hānai with the intention that she remain a direct heir to a possible restoration of the kingdom. She is a granddaughter of Prince David Kawānanakoa, the hānai adopted son of King Kalākaua. On February 10, 1883, David Kawānanakoa was granted the title of Prince and style of His Royal Highness by King Kalākaua through Letters Patent.

With the adoption by her grandmother, Abigail became a daughter of Prince Kawānanakoa. Her genealogy firmly establishes her as a member of the Hawaiian royal family. In 1986, she told writer Marilyn Kim that, had the kingdom continued, it was her cousin Edward A. Kawānanakoa who would have been heir to the Kawānanakoa\Kalākaua lines, as he was the first born of the oldest sibling, but joked that she would be the "power behind the throne." Senator Daniel Inouye has described Abigail as "a member of the family with the closest blood ties to the Kalākaua Dynasty". Jon M. Van Dyke, a University of Hawaii law professor, states in his book Who Owns the Crown Lands of Hawai'i? that the Kawānanakoas view themselves as the designated heirs of the Kalākaua line, though none of them have ever claimed an interest in the Crown Lands.

== Equine endeavors ==
Kawānanakoa was an expert horsewoman and owner of ranches in Hawaii, California, and Washington State. She was a 20-year cumulative breeder of AQHA quarter horses. Her horses' many victories include the 1993 All American Futurity (G1) with A Classic Dash and the 1995 Los Alamitos Million Futurity (G1, now the Los Alamitos Two Million Futurity) with Evening Snow. After winning "the richest race in the quarter horse world", she retired A Classic Dash from racing to stand at her Lakeview Quarter Horse Ranch in California. Due to her support of the equine medicine program at Colorado State University, in May 2016, she was awarded an honorary degree.

== Family legacy and philanthropy ==
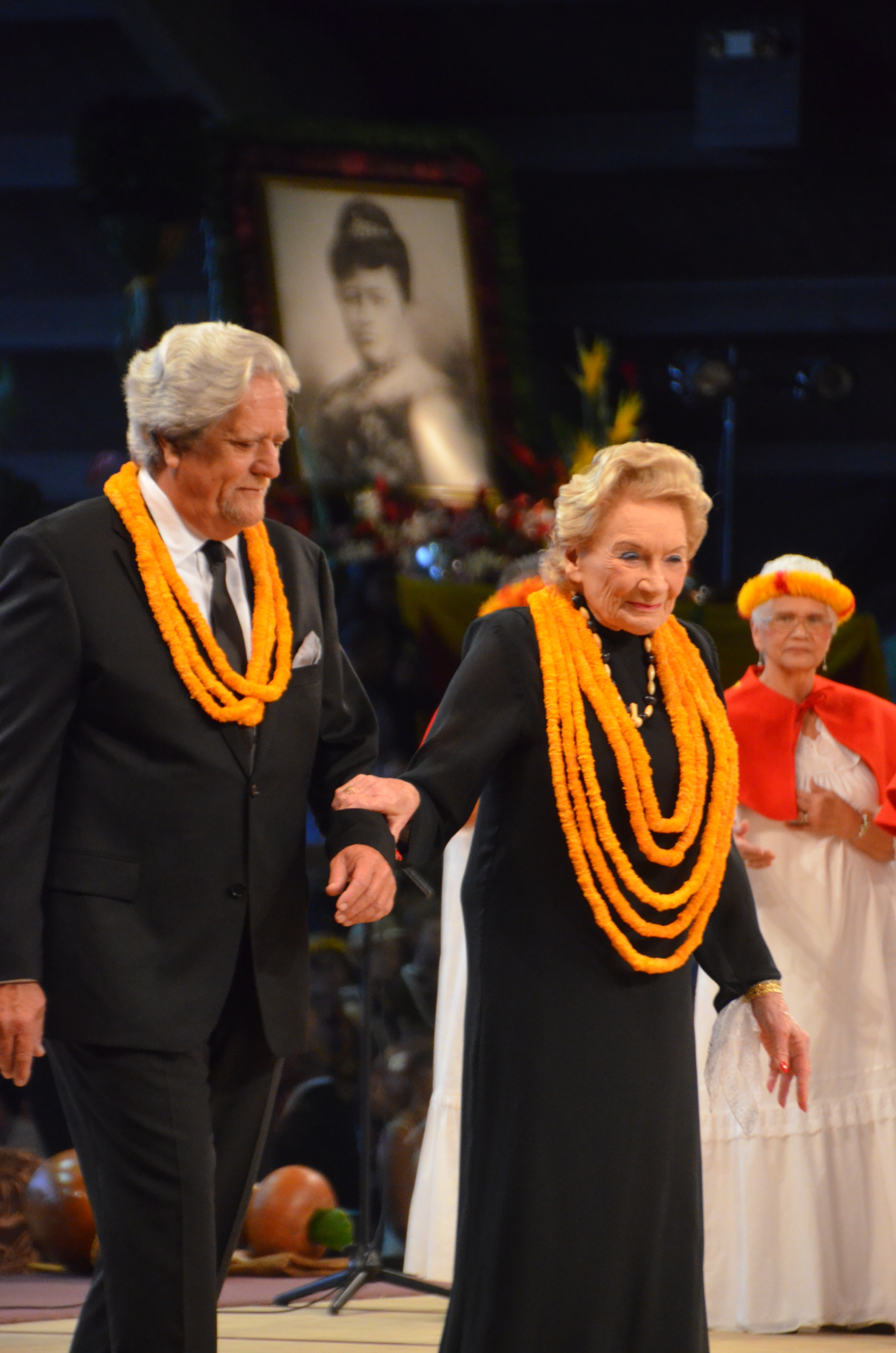
Abigail Kawānanakoa as guest of honor at the Merrie Monarch Festival, 2013

Kawānanakoa was the president of the Friends of ʻIolani Palace from 1971 to 1998, succeeding her mother, who founded the organization. The palace was built by her adopted great-granduncle, King David Kalākaua. She was active in various causes for the preservation of native Hawaiian culture, including the restoration of 'Iolani Palace.

Kawānanakoa was heiress to the largest stake in the estate of her great-grandfather, James Campbell, a 19th-century industrialist from Ireland. When the estate was converted into a corporation in 2007, her share was estimated to be about US$250 million.

In 2013, Kawānanakoa requested to be buried in a new crypt at the Royal Mausoleum of Hawaii at Mauna ʻAla directly adjacent to the Wyllie Tomb. The request was approved by the State Land Board in April 2013, but the decision became controversial in the Hawaiian community.

Kawānanakoa was a supporter of the Thirty Meter Telescope protests aimed at preventing the construction of the Thirty Meter Telescope at Mauna Kea. She also helped subsidize the annual cost of Merrie Monarch Festival.

She also supported the Polynesian Voyaging Society (PVS).

== Personal life ==
Royal Monogram of Princess Abigail of Hawaii

In 1952, Kawānanakoa was briefly engaged to Peter Perkins, a male model and star player on the Oahu polo team, although they did not marry.

On October 1, 2017, Kawānanakoa married Veronica Gail Worth (now Veronica Gail Kawānanakoa), who was 63 years old at the time, in Honolulu. The couple were married in a ceremony performed at the home of Justice Steven Levinson. In 2017 Kawānanakoa had a medical episode. In a handwritten letter by her to the media, she explained her firing of her former attorney James Wright. Wright, a trustee for the multimillion-dollar Abigail K. K. Kawananakoa Revocable Living Trust, made accusations that Worth abused her 92-year-old spouse. Michael Rudy, Worth's attorney, and Michael A. Lilly, Kawānanakoa's attorney, both denied the allegations. First Hawaiian Bank succeeded Wright as trustee in 2018.

Kawānanakoa died of complications of a stroke on December 11, 2022, at the age of 96 at her home in Nuʻuanu. Her death was announced in the Hawaiian language at ʻIolani Palace. Governor Josh Green ordered all flags to be flown at half-staff out of respect for Kawānanakoa.

The Kawānanakoa family announced that her body would lay-in-state at ʻIolani Palace in a public memorial. A private funeral took place at the chapel at the Royal Mausoleum at Mauna ʻAla on January 23, 2023. Her body returned to the mortuary at Oahu Cemetery after the private funeral service to await burial upon the completion of the tomb at Mauna ʻAla.

On 27 March 2023 Kawānanakoa was buried in her final resting place at Mauna ʻAla in a small private ceremony. Her tomb of black granite and flecks of gold is on the makai (seaward) side of the entrance to Mauna Ala, has a 15-by-15-foot foundation and is 8 feet tall. The royal tomb also has two pūloʻuloʻu, a symbol that royalty is present, and a guardian in front of the tomb.

== Ancestry ==
Jonah Piʻikoi

Kekahili	Kūhiō Kalanianaʻole	Kinoiki Kekaulike
David Kahalepouli Piikoi	Victoria Kūhiō Kinoiki Kekaulike	James Campbell
David Kawānanakoa	Abigail Campbell Kawānanakoa * Legally adopted mother of Abigail Kinoiki Kekaulike Kawānanakoa
William Jeremiah Ellerbrock	Lydia Liliuokalani Kawānanakoa
Abigail Kinoiki Kekaulike Kawānanakoa

John Maipinepine Bright
Abigail Kuaihelani Maipinepine Bright

Mary Kamai Hanaike
