= Abigail Campbell Kawānanakoa =

Princess of Hawaiʻi (1882–1945)

- Princess of Hawaiʻi
- Princess
- Born: January 1, 1882; Honolulu, Kingdom of Hawaii
- Died: April 12, 1945 (aged 63); Honolulu, Territory of Hawaii
- Burial: April 15, 1945; Mauna ʻAla Royal Mausoleum
- Spouse: David Kawānanakoa
- Issue: David Kalākaua Kawānanakoa; Abigail Kapiʻolani Kawānanakoa; Lydia Liliʻuokalani Kawānanakoa; Abigail Kinoiki Kekaulike Kawānanakoa (adoptive)
- House: Kawānanakoa
- Father: James Campbell
- Mother: Abigail Kuaihelani Maipinepine
- Religion: Catholicism, (prev. Anglicanism)
- Occupation: Political leader

Republican National Committeewoman from Hawaii
- In office 1924–1936

Abigail Wahiʻikaʻahuʻula Campbell Kawānanakoa (also known as Princess David Kawānanakoa, January 1, 1882 – April 12, 1945) was a politician and Princess of Hawaii.

== Life ==
Abigail Campbell was born January 1, 1882, in Honolulu. She was born in the same bedroom of the Emma Street mansion which had been the birthplace of Princess Kaʻiulani. Her father was James Campbell, one of the wealthiest industrialists in the Kingdom of Hawaii. Her mother was part-Hawaiian Abigail Kuaihelani Maipinepine Bright.

She graduated from the College of Notre Dame in Belmont, California, in 1900, where she converted from Anglicanism, religion of her parents, to Roman Catholicism. On January 6, 1902, by virtue of her marriage to Prince David Laʻamea Kahalepouli Kawānanakoa Piʻikoi, she became known as Princess Abigail.

Prince David was one of the heirs of David Kalakaua, monarch of the Kingdom of Hawaiʻi along with Princess Victoria Kaʻiulani and Kalakaua's sister, then Crown Princess Liliuokalani. Prince David died of pneumonia in 1908. She and Prince David had three children; David Kalākaua Kawānanakoa, Abigail Helen Kapiʻolani Kawānanakoa, and Lydia Liliʻuokalani Kawānanakoa.

Upon the death of her brother-in-law, Prince Jonah Kūhiō Kalanianaʻole in 1922, Princess Abigail effectively became the leader of all native Hawaiians and took an active part in Hawaiʻi's politics as their advocate. She also assumed the role of heir to the throne as native Hawaiians continued to pray for the return of their sovereignty. Unlike her brother-in-law Prince Kūhiō, Princess Abigail was a devoted Republican and worked to develop its platforms and pursue its ideals. In 1924 she became the Republican national committeewoman for Hawaii and served in that capacity for twelve years. Her prominence on the national stage made Princess Abigail a role model for women in Hawaii.

She died at her Honolulu home on April 12, 1945.

== Fiction ==
She has a short role in Harry Turtledove's novel in Days of Infamy where she is offered the throne of a restored Kingdom of Hawaii. She refuses, not wishing to be a puppet monarch of the Japanese.

In the 1986 Television movie drama Blood & Orchids inspired by the 1932 Massie Trial, a character based on Abigail Campbell Kawānanakoa is not considered historically accurate.

== Gallery ==
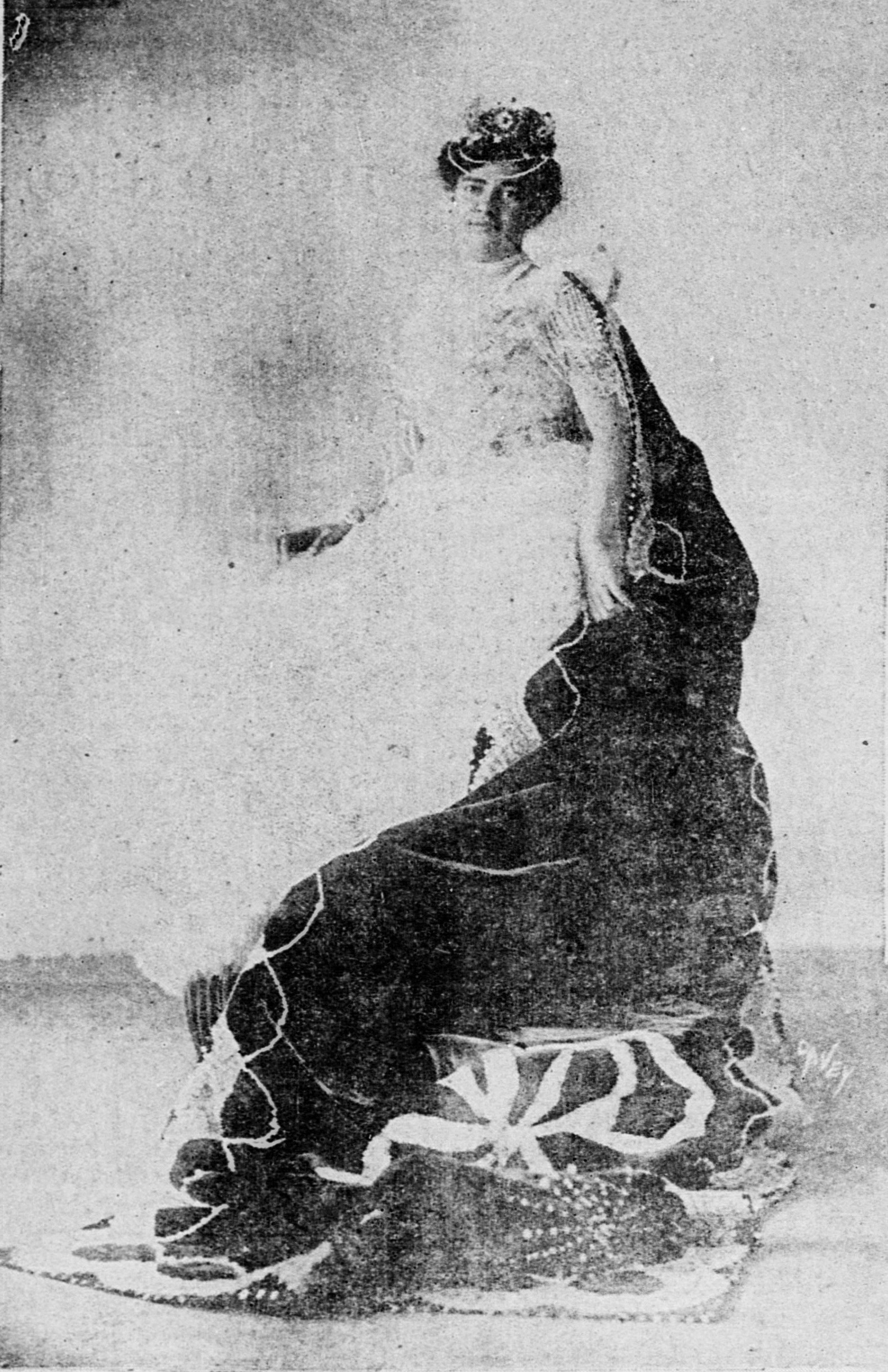
In 1902, before her marriage

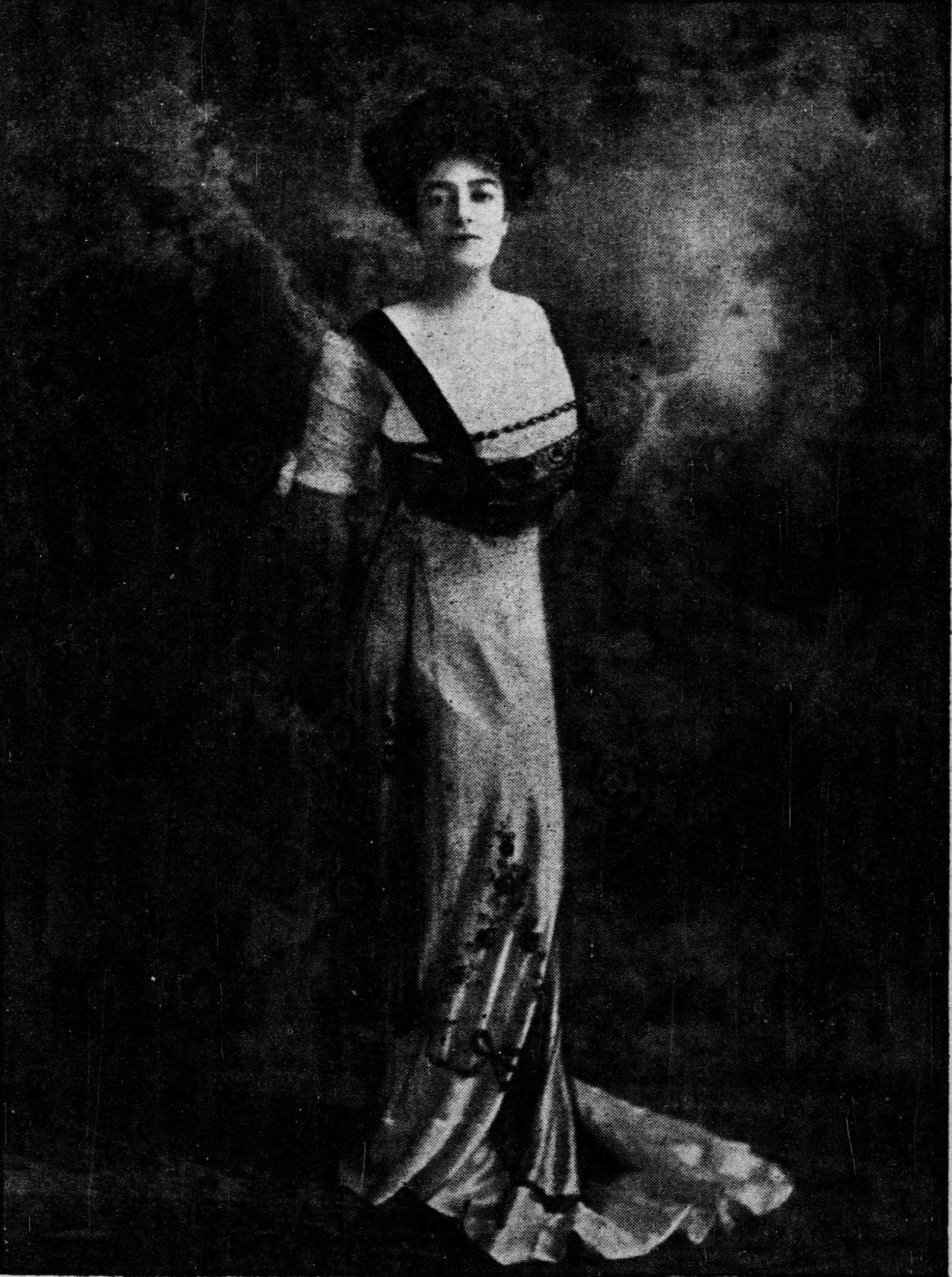
Photograph by Theodore C. Marceau

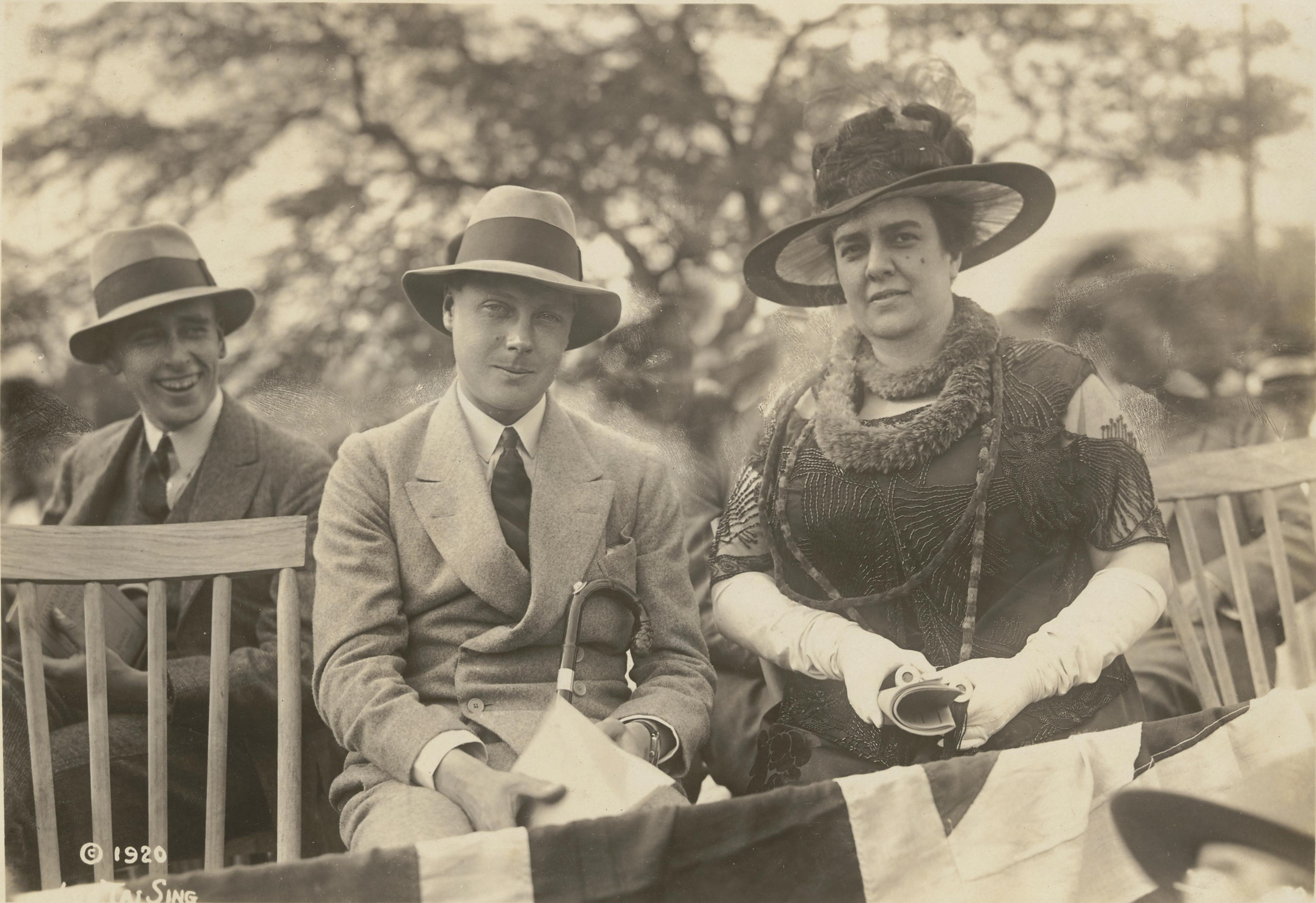
With the Prince of Wales, ca. 1920

== Family tree ==
Kawānanakoa family tree

James Campbell (1826–1900)
Abigail Campbell; Kawānanakoa (1882–1945)
David Kalākaua; Kawānanakoa (1904–1953)
Edward A. Kawānanakoa (1924–1997)
Quentin Kawānanakoa (born 1961)
Kincaid Kawānanakoa (born 1997)

Abigail Kuaihelani; Campbell (1858–1908)	David Piʻikoi (1845–1878)
David Kawānanakoa (1868–1908)	Edward Abnel; Keliʻiahonui (1869–1887)
Abigail Kapiʻolani; Kawānanakoa (1903–1961)
Poʻomaikelani Kawānanakoa (1926–1998)	Esther Kapiʻolani, Marchesa Marignoli (1928–1985)
Riley Kawānanakoa (born 1999)

Victoria Kinoiki; Kekaulike (1843–1884)
Jonah Kūhiō; Kalanianaʻole (1871–1922) m. Elizabeth Kahanu; Kalanianaʻole (1879–1932)
Lydia Liliʻuokalani; Kawānanakoa (1905–1969)
Abigail K. K. Kawānanakoa (1926–2022)
