= David Kalākaua Kawānanakoa =

Member of the House of Kawānanakoa

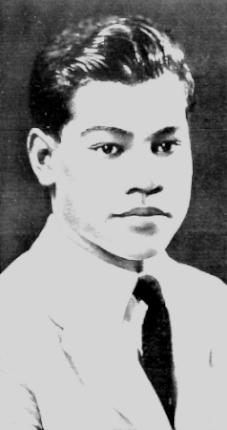
- Born: March 10, 1904; Honolulu, Oahu
- Died: May 20, 1953 (aged 49); Honolulu, Oahu
- Burial: Royal Mausoleum of Hawaii, Honolulu, Hawaii, U.S.
- Spouse: Eileen Hutchins; Gertrude Leilani Scott; Arvilla Kinslea; Cecelia Kuliaikanuʻuwaiʻaleʻale Parker-Waipa
- Father: David Kawānanakoa
- Mother: Abigail Campbell Kawānanakoa

David Kalākaua Kawānanakoa (March 10, 1904 – May 20, 1953), also known as Prince Koke, was a member of the House of Kawānanakoa and the only son of Prince David Kawānanakoa and Princess Abigail Campbell Kawānanakoa.

== Life ==
He was born on March 10, 1904, at Honolulu, Oahu. He was christened at the St. Augustine's Church on May 22, 1904. His siblings were Abigail Kapiolani Kawānanakoa and Lydia Liliuokalani Kawānanakoa. He was educated abroad due to his father's status as a former prince and politician. He attended Oahu College, Fay School, in Southborough, Massachusetts; Taft School, Watertown, Connecticut, and Belmont Military Academy, Belmont, California. Kawānanakoa served in World War II with the US Coast Guard.

Kawānanakoa married three times: in 1929 to Eileen Hutchins, daughter of Rear-Admiral Charles Thomas Hutchins, USN, and Commander of the US Pacific Fleet. He divorced Eileen in 1931 and remarried to Gertrude Leilani (October 17, 1904 – January 26, 1978) in 1941. She was the former wife of Lindsay Anton Faye, and she later married George Rossman Humphrey.

He entered a common-law marriage with Arvilla Kinslea. On October 24, 1937, after a wild party, Kinslea was found dead and stabbed in the neck with a broken piece of crockery. Four years before, Kawānanakoa had received a suspended sentence for killing a woman due to his reckless driving. He confessed to the murder of Kinslea and was sentenced to several years in prison. Kawānanakoa married a third time, on October 27, 1949, to Cecelia Kuliaikanuʻuwaiʻaleʻale Parker-Waipa (1907–1981), daughter of Stephen Keaolani Parker-Waipa and Helen McCabe Wong and granddaughter of Robert Parker Waipa, a former Royal Guard captain for King Kalākaua.

Kawānanakoa died of a heart attack at Honolulu, Oahu, on May 20, 1953, at the age of 49. He was buried there in the Royal Mausoleum of Hawaii at Mauna ʻAla in Nuʻuanu Valley. He was the last royal to be interred at the Royal Mausoleum. He died without children. The Kawānanakoa family survives through the descendants of his sisters Abigail Kapiolani Kawānanakoa and Lydia Liliuokalani Kawānanakoa.
