= Abigail Kapiʻolani Kawānanakoa =

Hawaiian royal

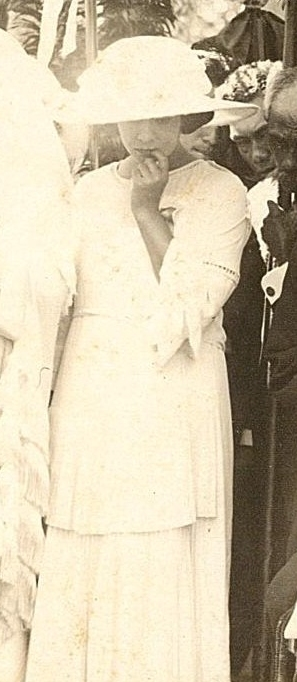
- Born: March 14, 1903; Honolulu, Oahu
- Died: April 8, 1961 (aged 58); Maui
- Burial: Oahu Cemetery
- Spouse: Andrew Anderson Lambert (m. 1923; div. 1930); Thomas Foster Ena (m. 1936; div. 1939); Harry Field (m. 1944)
- Issue: Edward Abnel Keliʻiahonui Kawānanakoa; Virginia Poʻomaikelani Kawānanakoa; Esther Kapiʻolani Kawānanakoa
- House: Kawānanakoa
- Father: David Kawānanakoa
- Mother: Abigail Campbell Kawānanakoa

Abigail Helen Kapiʻolani Kawānanakoa (March 14, 1903 – April 8, 1961) was a member of the House of Kawānanakoa and the eldest daughter of Prince David Kawānanakoa and Princess Abigail Campbell Kawānanakoa.

== Life ==
She was born in Honolulu, Oahu, on March 14, 1903, and was adopted by her maternal grandmother, Abigail Kuaihelani Campbell Parker, on February 8, 1908. Her name was changed to Kapiʻolani Campbell after her adoption. Only a few months after her adoption, Kapiʻolani lost both her father and grandmother. After her grandmother's death, her widower Samuel Parker petitioned to be granted Kapiʻolani's guardianship, but her mother was declared as her guardian instead. Her siblings were David Kalākaua Kawānanakoa and Lydia Liliʻuokalani Kawānanakoa.

Kapiʻolani married three times. Her first marriage was to Andrew Anderson Lambert (1900–1966) in 1923, whom she divorced in 1930, She had three children by her first husband: Edward A. Kawānanakoa, Virginia Poʻomaikelani Kawānanakoa (1926–98), and Esther Kapiʻolani Kawānanakoa Marignoli (born 1928). She remarried in 1936 to Thomas Foster Ena, son of Hawaiian politician John Ena Jr. They divorced in 1939. She married a third time to Harry Field (1911–1964) in 1944. Field was educated at Punahou School, Honolulu, Oahu, and Oregon State University at Corvallis, Oregon, and served as President of the Hawaiian Civic Club from 1952 to 1953 and Senator of the Hawaii State Senate between 1963 and 1964. Among other things, from 1945 she was the Regent of the Hale o na Alii o Hawaii (House of Chiefs of Hawaii).

On the subject of the restoration of the Hawaiian monarchy, she is quoted to have said: "If America wanted to do something on her own accord to restore the monarchy, that would be all right... but no Hawaiian would do anything to hurt America. We love America too much." She died on Maui of a stroke, on April 8, 1961.

There were plans to bury her at a new burial plot at the Royal Mausoleum, but her widower Harry Field felt uncomfortable about the prospect of being buried alongside her at the Royal Mausoleum. Instead, he had her buried in the Oahu Cemetery on the Kawānanakoa family plot.

== Family tree ==
- Kawānanakoa family tree
