= Lydia Liliʻuokalani Kawānanakoa =

Hawaiian noble (1905–1969)

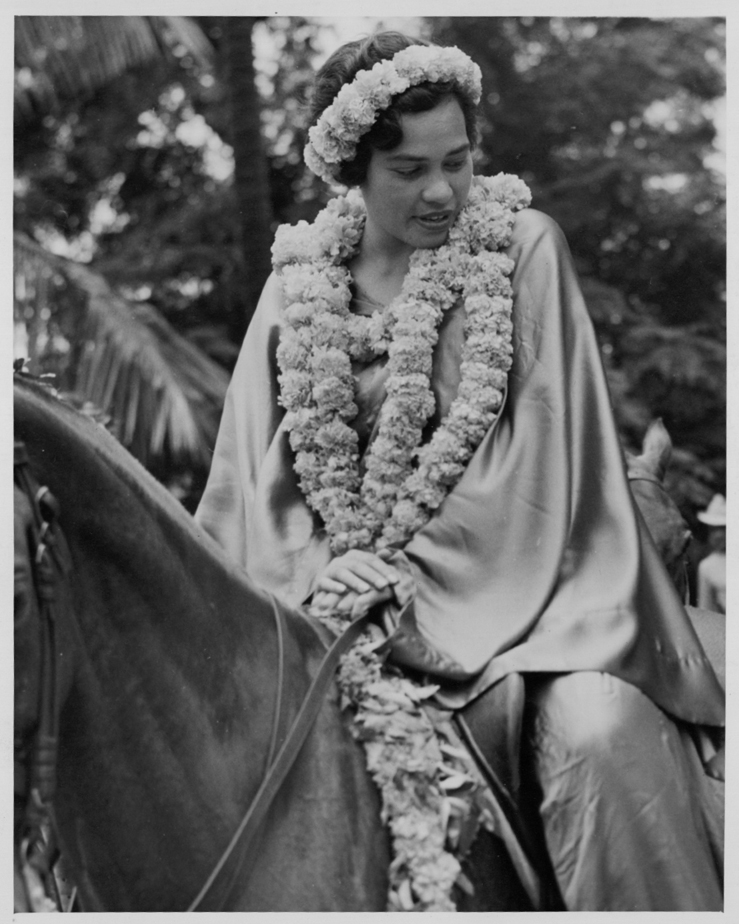
- Born: July 22, 1905; Honolulu, Oahu
- Died: May 19, 1969 (aged 63); Waialae, Honolulu, Oahu
- Burial: Nuʻuanu Memorial Park
- Spouse: William Jeremiah Ellerbrock (m. 1925; div. 1927) Charles James Brenham (m. 1928, divorced) Clark Lee (m. 1938; died 1953) Charles E. Morris (m. 1954; div. 1959) (m. 1968)
- Issue: Abigail Kinoiki Kekaulike Kawānanakoa
- House: Kawānanakoa
- Father: David Kawānanakoa
- Mother: Abigail Campbell Kawānanakoa
- Occupation: Royalty, philanthropist

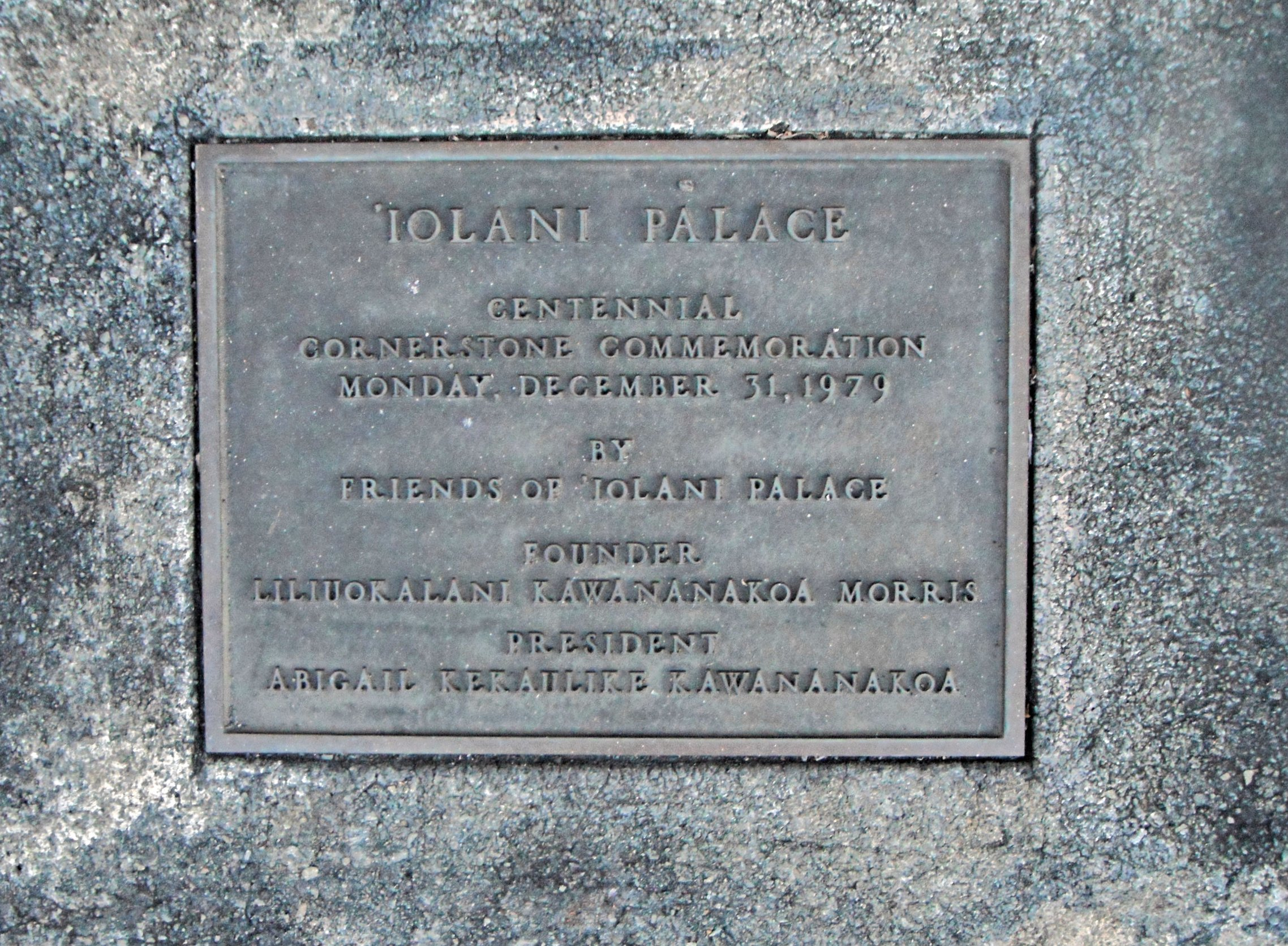
Centennial marker at ʻIolani Palace. Kawānanakoa is listed as founder of the Friends of ʻIolani Palace.

Helen Lydia Kamakaʻeha Liliʻuokalani Kawānanakoa (July 22, 1905 – May 19, 1969) was a member of the House of Kawānanakoa and the second daughter of David Kawānanakoa and Abigail Campbell Kawānanakoa.

== Early life ==
Born July 22, 1905, Liliʻuokalani Kawānanakoa was named after Queen Liliʻuokalani, the last monarch of Hawaii. Having been born after the abolition of the monarchy, she had no official royal title; however, she was still known by many in the Hawaiian community as Princess Liliuokalani.

She attended a convent school in San Francisco. During her youth, she was known as the "flapper" princess and sported the then-fashionable bobbed hair. Her siblings were David Kalākaua Kawānanakoa and Abigail Kapiʻolani Kawānanakoa.

== Marriages and family ==
Liliʻuokalani married five times. Her first marriage was to Dr. William Jeremiah Ellerbrock on January 17, 1925, at Honolulu. The couple had one daughter before divorcing in 1927:

- Abigail Kinoiki Kekaulike Kawānanakoa (1926–2022).

Following the divorce, Abigail was adopted by Liliʻuokalani's mother. Her second marriage was to Charles James Brenham at Niu, August 11, 1928; they also divorced. Her third husband was war correspondent Clark Lee, whom she married on November 30, 1938; Lee died of a heart attack in 1953. Her fourth husband, whom she married in 1954, was Charles E. Morris Jr; the couple divorced in 1959, and remarried in 1968.

== Legacy and death ==
She was the founder of the Kona Hawaiian Civic Club in 1952 and was the founder and First President of Friends of ʻIolani Palace from 1966 to 1969. She was also active in Hawaiian Civic Clubs, served on the Hawaiian Homes Commission, served as regent of Hale o Na Alii, and was a lifetime member of the Kaahumanu Society and Daughters of Hawaii.

She died of cancer at her home in Waialae, Honolulu, on May 19, 1969. At her request, her funeral was a private ceremony with none of the pomp or displays of former Hawaiian royal funerals. She is buried at Nuʻuanu Memorial Park.
