= David Kawānanakoa =

Prince of Hawaiʻi (1868–1908)

- Prince of Hawaiʻi
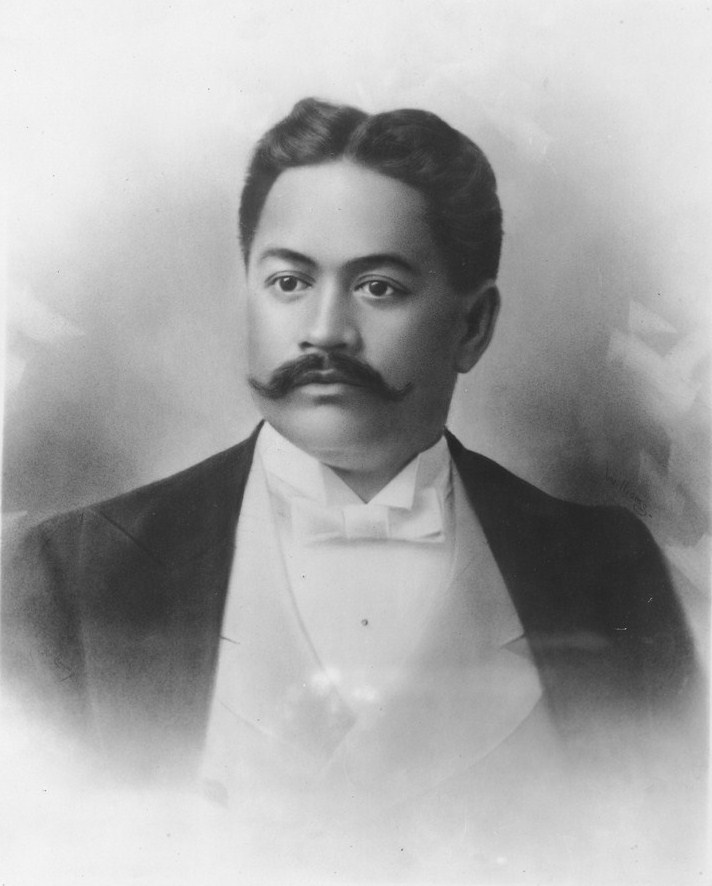
- Born: February 19, 1868; Kaʻalaʻa, Honolulu, Oʻahu
- Died: June 2, 1908 (aged 40); Hotel Stewart, San Francisco, California
- Burial: June 21, 1908; Mauna ʻAla Royal Mausoleum
- Spouse: Abigail Wahiʻikaʻahuʻula Campbell
- Issue: David Kalākaua Kawānanakoa; Abigail Kapiʻolani Kawānanakoa; Lydia Liliʻuokalani Kawānanakoa
Names
- David Laʻamea Kahalepouli Kinoiki Kawānanakoa
- House: Kalākaua; Kawānanakoa
- Father: David Kahalepouli Piʻikoi; King Kalākaua (hānai)
- Mother: Victoria Kinoiki Kekaulike; Queen Kapiʻolani (hānai)
- Religion: Roman Catholic Church (after 1907); Church of Hawaii (before 1907)

David Laʻamea Kahalepouli Kinoiki Kawānanakoa (February 19, 1868 – June 2, 1908) was a prince of the Hawaiian Kingdom and founder of the House of Kawānanakoa. Born into Hawaiian nobility, Kawānanakoa grew up in the royal court of his uncle King Kalākaua and aunt Queen Kapiʻolani who adopted him and his brothers after the death of their parents. On multiple occasions, he and his brothers were considered as candidates for the line of succession to the Hawaiian throne after their cousin Princess Kaʻiulani but were never constitutionally proclaimed. He was sent to be educated abroad in the United States and the United Kingdom where he pioneered the sport of surfing. After his education abroad, he served as a political advisor to Kalākaua's successor, Queen Liliʻuokalani until the overthrow of the Hawaiian Kingdom in 1893. After Hawaii's annexation to the United States, he co-founded the Democratic Party of Hawaii.

== Birth and family ==
Kawānanakoa was born February 19, 1868, at Kaʻalaʻa at the mouth of the Pauoa Valley, in Honolulu, on the old homestead of his aunt Queen Kapiʻolani. Kawānanakoa was the first child of his father David Kahalepouli Piʻikoi from Kauaʻi island, and his mother Victoria Kinoiki Kekaulike, a noble from the district of Hilo who was later the royal governor of the island of Hawaiʻi. His younger brothers were Edward Abnel Keliʻiahonui (1869–1887) and Jonah Kūhiō Kalanianaʻole (1871–1922).

Both his parents were linked to the reigning House of Kalākaua. Kawānanakoa's mother was the youngest sister of Queen Kapiʻolani, consort to King Kalākaua, who ruled from 1874 to 1891. Kawānanakoa's father was also King Kalākaua's paternal first cousin.

His family was of the aliʻi class of the Hawaiian nobility and traced their descent to the ruling lines of each of the Hawaiian Islands prior to conquest. His mother's paternal line goes back to the ruling families of the island of Hawaiʻi while her maternal grandfather was King Kaumualiʻi, the last ruler of an independent Kauaʻi before its cession to King Kamehameha I who united the Hawaiian Kingdom in 1810. Kaumualiʻi was also descended from the ruling families of Maui and Oʻahu. Kawānanakoa's father's paternal line was descended from a junior line of Kauaʻi while his father’s mother maternal line also originated from the ruling line of Hawaiʻi Island.

His name Kawānanakoa translates as "fearless prophecy" in Hawaiian. Born with the surname Piʻikoi, Kawānanakoa and Kalanianaʻole (more commonly referred to as Kūhiō) later adopted their given Hawaiian names as their surname. Sources state the brothers either changed their names in 1883 or 1891.

=== Royal succession ===
At a young age, Kawānanakoa and Kūhiō were hānai (informally adopted) by the childless Kapiʻolani and Kalākaua while the second brother Keliʻiahonui was hānai by their other maternal aunt Poʻomaikelani.

After their father's death in 1878, his mother Kekaulike brought Kawānanakoa and his brothers to live in Honolulu. The family split their times living with the king and queen on the premise of the old ʻIolani Palace or at Kapiʻolani's private residence Pualeilani in Waikīkī where the Hyatt Regency Waikiki now stands. After the completion of the new palace in 1882, they occupied a large second floor bedroom, which later became known as the "Imprisonment Room" because it was where Kalākaua's successor Queen Liliʻuokalani was imprisoned in 1895.

On February 10, 1883, Kawānanakoa was granted by letters patent the title of Prince and style of His Royal Highness by King Kalākaua along with his mother, brothers and aunt. On February 14, Kawānanakoa served as bearer of the crown and Kūhiō as either the bearer of the palaoa or the consort crown during Kalākaua's and Kapiʻolani's coronation ceremony at ʻIolani Palace. After the death of Kekaulike in 1884, Kalākaua and Kapiʻolani assumed legal guardianship over all three boys.

In Kalākaua's will drafted in 1888, Kawānanakoa and his brother Kūhiō (their other brother Keliʻiahonui was deceased by this point) were included in a proposed line of succession after Liliʻuokalani, the king's niece Princess Kaʻiulani, Queen Kapiʻolani, and Princess Poʻomaikelani. The king also furthered outlined that he wished in the case that the throne passed to Kawānanakoa or his brother that they "assume the name and title of Kalakaua, and to be numbered in order from" him.

On Article 22 of proposed 1893 Constitution of the Hawaiian Kingdom, Queen Liliʻuokalani outlined the succession to include Kaʻiulani followed by Kawānanakoa and Kūhiō and their legitimate heirs.

== Education ==
Kawānanakoa and his brothers were educated at St. Alban's College (now ʻIolani School) and Oahu College (now Punahou School). After completing their basic education in Hawaii, they also traveled abroad for further study. His uncle King Kalākaua championed future Hawaiian leaders attaining a broader education with his 1880 Hawaiian Youths Abroad program. The Hawaiian government sent Kawānanakoa and his brothers to attend Saint Matthew's School, a private Episcopal military school in San Mateo, California. Kawānanakoa was enrolled in the fall of 1884 and his younger brothers were enrolled in the spring of 1885. Keliʻiahonui fell ill at school and returned to Hawaii where he died. Kawānanakoa and Kūhiō returned to Hawaii shortly afterward.

Kawānanakoa would also attend the Royal Agricultural College in Cirencester from 1890 to 1891.

While attending school in San Mateo, Kawānanakoa and his two brothers would travel south to the Pacific seashore at Santa Cruz. The brothers demonstrated the Hawaiian sport of board surfing to the locals, becoming the first California surfers in 1885. In September 1890, Kawānanakoa and Kūhiō became the first surfers in the British Isles and taught their English tutor John Wrightson to surf on the beaches of Bridlington in northern England.

== Political career ==
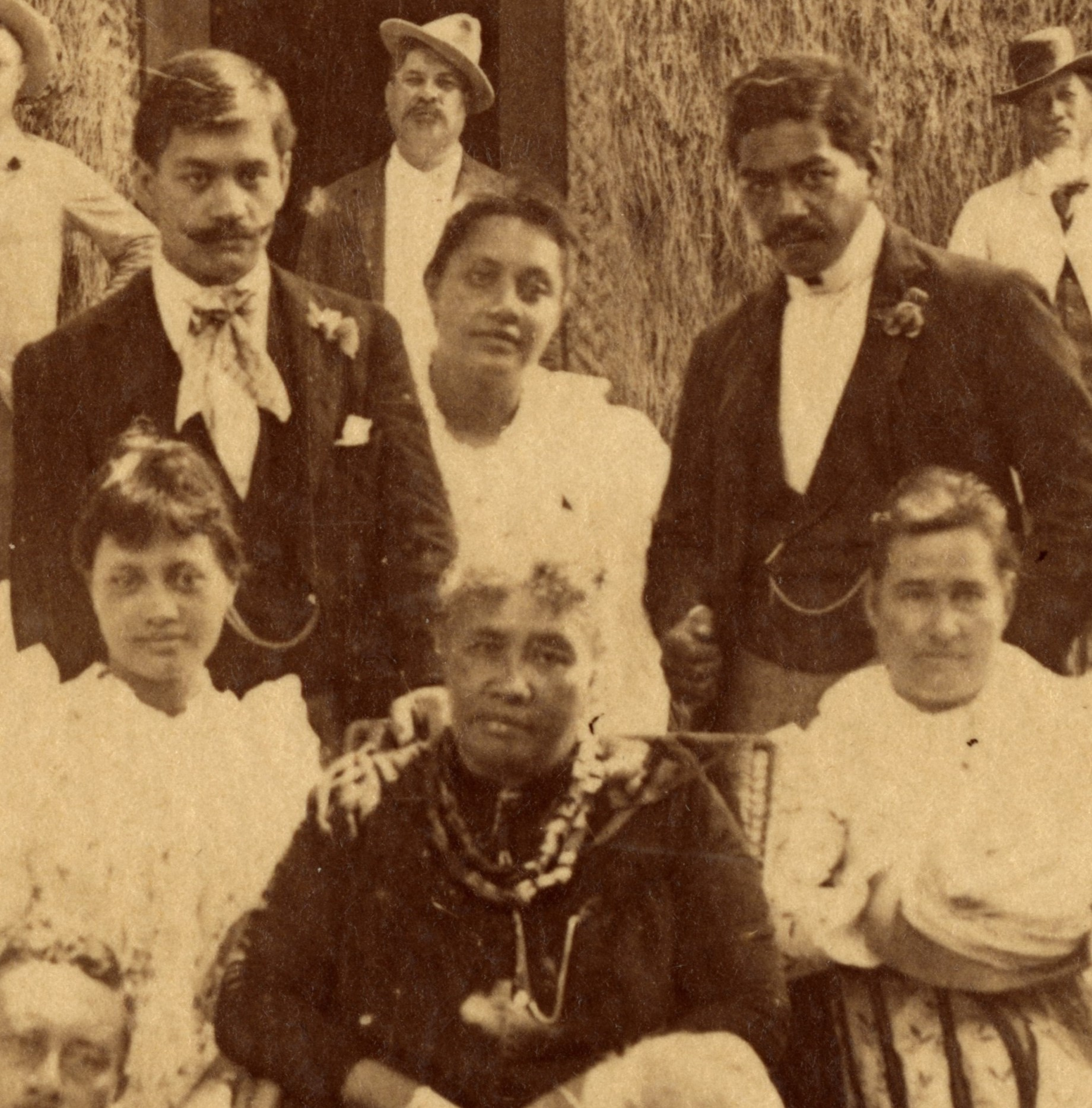
Kawānanakoa (left) and Kūhiō (right) with Queen Liliʻuokalani (seated, center), 1891

On August 31, 1891, Queen Liliʻuokalani appointed Kawānanakoa as a member of her Privy Council of State, a constitutionally-created advisory body purposed to advise and consent to acts made by the monarch. Kawānanakoa was also created Knight Grand Cross of the Royal Order of Kalākaua.

Liliʻuokalani was overthrown on January 17, 1893, and the Provisional Government of Hawaii established under pro-annexation leader Sanford B. Dole was officially recognized. The queen temporarily relinquished her throne to the United States, rather than the Dole-led government, in hopes that the United States would restore Hawaii's sovereignty to the rightful holder. A pro-annexationist delegation headed by Lorrin A. Thurston was sent by the provisional government for Washington, D.C., on January 19, to lobby for immediate annexation by the United States. The queen wrote letters to President Benjamin Harrison and President-elect Grover Cleveland outlining her case. However, the provisional government refused the queen's request to send her own envoys on the same ship as their delegation. Liliʻuokalani appointed Kawānanakoa and her lawyer Paul Neumann to represent her case. Archibald Scott Cleghorn paid for the travel expenses of Edward C. Macfarlane, another of the queen's envoys, to protect the rights of his daughter Princess Kaʻiulani. Annexationist William Richards Castle, who was a commissioner on Thurston's delegation, described Kawānanakoa as "a very pleasant fellow," but, "of course, [is] purely ornamental."

The trio left Honolulu on the Australia on February 2, arrived in San Francisco on February 11, and reached Washington, DC, on February 17. Macfarlane and Kawānanakoa were dispatched to present the queen's letter to President-elect Cleveland. While in New York, Kawānanakoa also visited his cousin Princess Kaʻiulani, who was in the United States to protest the proposed annexation of Hawaii, with her guardian Theophilus Harris Davies. Dissent developed between Davies and Liliʻuokalani's representatives in the United States over Davies' influence over Kaʻiulani. Kawānanakoa along with Neumann, Macfarlane and John Mott-Smith, the Hawaiian Minister to the United States, voiced criticism at Davies' action in bringing Kaʻiulani to the United States without the consent of Cleghorn or the queen. Cleveland was inaugurated on March 4. The new president withdrew the treaty of annexation from the Senate on March 9 and appointed James Henderson Blount on March 11 as special commissioner to investigate the overthrow. Neumann, Macfarlane and Kawānanakoa returned on April 7.

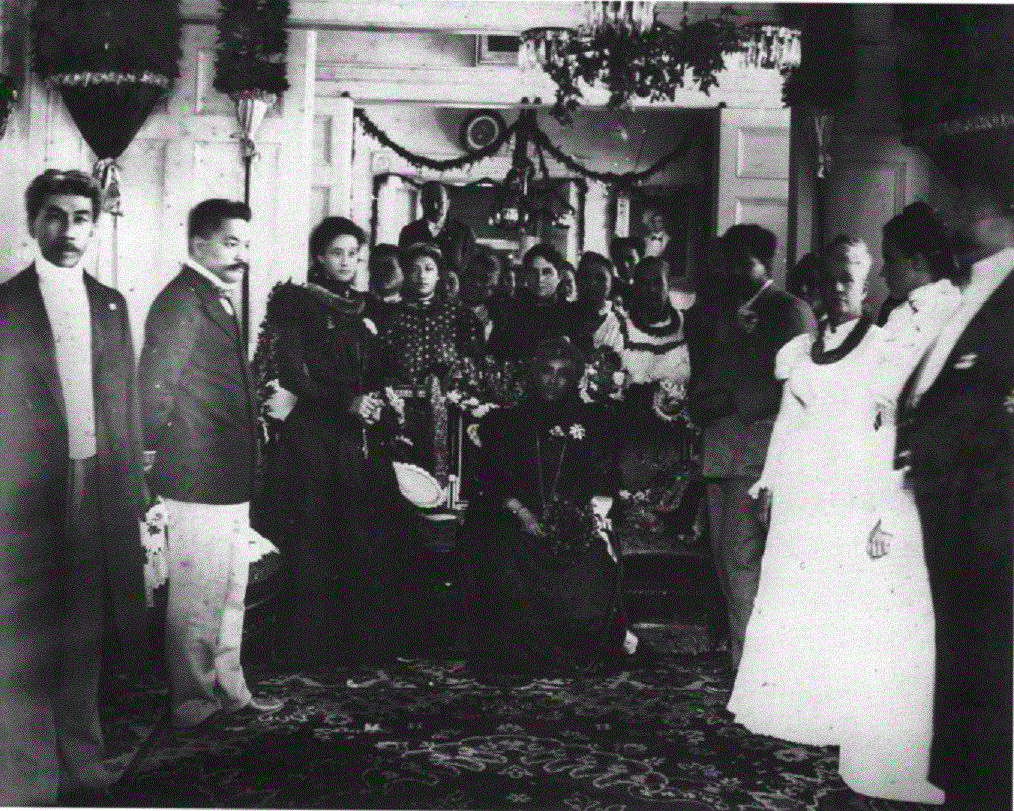
Kawānanakoa, second from left, Liliuokalani, center, during boycott of annexation ceremony.

After the formation of the Republic of Hawaii, Kawānanakoa became a supporter of the Royalist resistance and opposition to the overthrow of the monarchy. On January 6–9, 1895, supporters of the monarchy launched an unsuccessful counter-revolution led Robert William Wilcox to restore Liliʻuokalani to the throne. After the failed rebellion, the queen was imprisoned in the former bedrooms of the princes at ʻIolani Palace. Documents presented against the former queen at the subsequent trials included signed commissions for a restored monarchial government with Kawānanakoa and Kūhiō as governors of Maui and Kauai, respectively. A month after the rebellion, Kawānanakoa was arrested and jailed at Oahu Prison for misprision of treason on February 21. Kawānanakoa would be released due to lack of evidence. His brother Kūhiō played a more active role in the rebellion and was found guilty by a military tribunal and sentenced to one year imprisonment.

The Republic of Hawaii was annexed via the Newlands Resolution, a joint resolution of Congress, on July 7, 1898. The annexation ceremony was held on August 12, 1898, at the former ʻIolani Palace, now being used as the executive building of the government. President Dole handed over "the sovereignty and public property of the Hawaiian Islands" to United States minister Harold M. Sewall. The flag of Hawaii was lowered, and the flag of the United States was raised in its place. Liliʻuokalani with Kaʻiulani, Kawānanakoa and Kūhiō, their family members and retainers boycotted the event and shuttered themselves away at Washington Place, the private residence of Liliʻuokalani, in mourning. Many Native Hawaiians and royalists followed suit and refused to attend the ceremony.

=== Territory of Hawaii ===
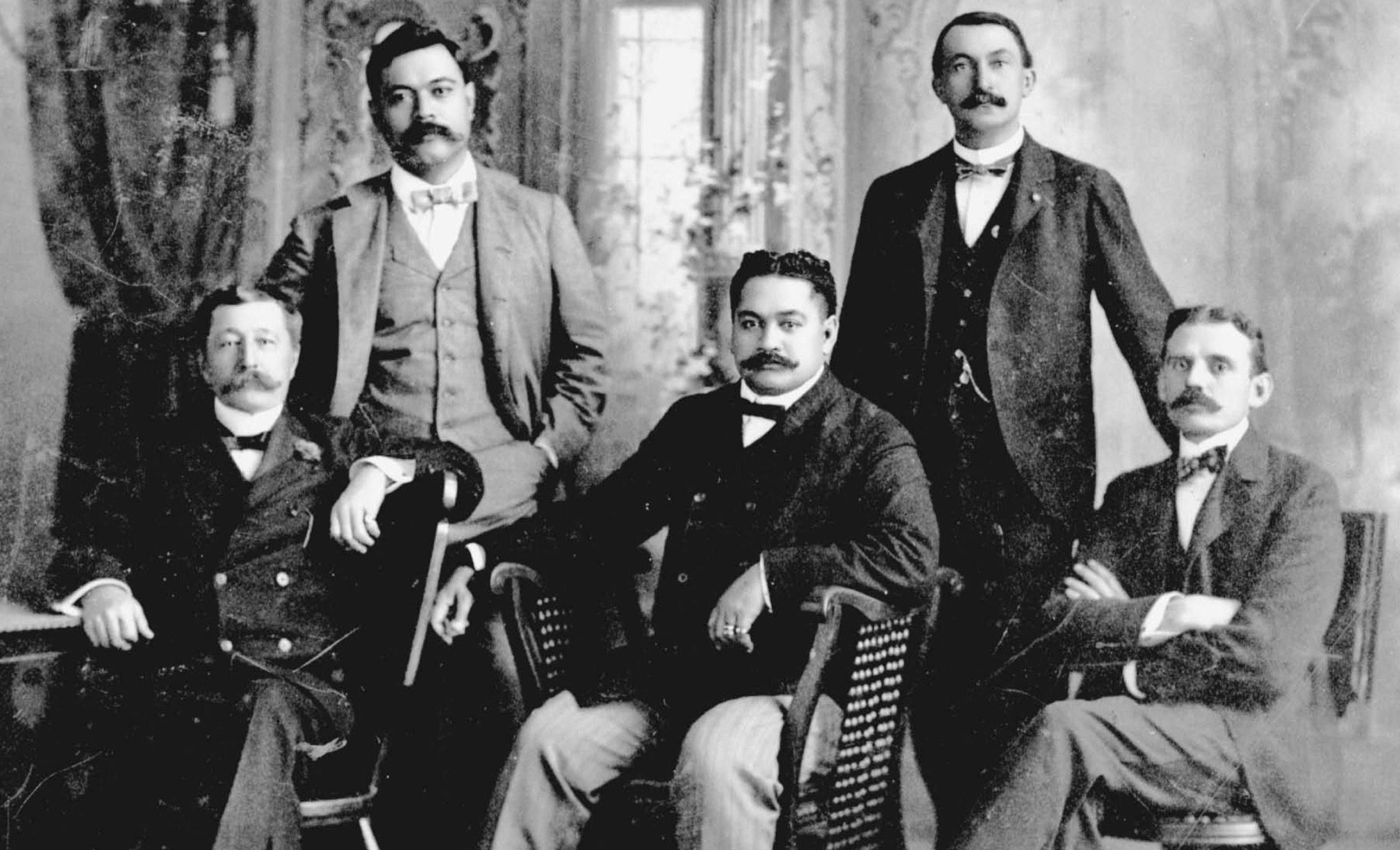
The Hawaiian Democratic Delegation, 1900.

Following annexation, the Hawaiian Organic Act established the Territory of Hawaii. Kawānanakoa became one of five founders of the Democratic Party of Hawaii. He attended the 1900 Democratic National Convention in Kansas City, Missouri and was the first royal to attend a national presidential nominating convention, where he was successful in gaining affiliation between his party and the Democratic Party in a party vote at the convention to incorporate Hawaii. He voted to break a tie about inserting a plank into the convention platform regarding free silver.

The Democrats nominated Kawānanakoa to run for the position of delegate to the United States Congress for the Territory of Hawaii in 1900. He placed third behind the Home Rule Party victor Robert William Wilcox and the Republican nominated Samuel Parker. In the subsequent election cycle, his younger brother Kūhiō (who was a former member of the Home Rule Party) joined the Republicans while the Democrats including Kawānanakoa allied with Wilcox. There was allegedly no animosity between the two brothers over the political differences. Kūhiō ended up winning the election, becoming the first former royal prince to serve in the United States Congress.

== Personal life ==
Records indicate that there may have been a written agreement of betrothal with Princess Kaʻiulani, that was quickly aborted. An unsubstantiated announcement dated February 3, 1898, was printed in The San Francisco Call and later reprinted in newspapers across the United States. According to the report, the betrothal was dependent upon the finalization of deeds to a sizeable real estate holding, transferred from Queen Kapiʻolani to both Kawānanakoa and Kalanianaʻole. On February 19, a denial of betrothal from Kawānanakoa was printed in the newspapers. Kapiʻolani did deed all her property, real and personal, to the brothers on February 10, with the express stipulation that the documentation not be executed until she was ready. Kapiʻolani wanted to hold off the transfer until she was too old to manage the property herself, and/or otherwise would believe she was close to death. She last saw the document with her notary Carlos A. Long, with her instructions to have changes made in the wording. Instead, the brothers had the deed executed immediately, without her knowledge. (Note: The personal writings of Curtis P. Iaukea, a royal courtier who served as chamberlain to King Kalākaua and later secretary to Queen Liliʻuokalani, notes: "On arriving at New York on our way home from the Jubilee, where I got the Honolulu papers, staring me in the face was the news that the Queen had deeded her property to her two Nephews, with some reservation for the payment of her outstanding liabilites [sic]. Curious to know what led the Queen to dispense with her estate in the way she did, I learned from one of the parties concerned in the transaction, whom I knew well and intimately, that in her anxiety that the older of the two Boys, David Kawananakoa, should marry Princess Kaʻiulani, a union that she had set her heart on, she executed the deed as a means of overcoming the reflection and representations made to her, that unless she did so, Kaʻiulani would not entertain or consent to marry David as he had no visible means of supporting a wife. That Princess Kaʻiulani ever entertained this proposition, I doubt. At all events, the union did not materialize, much to the Queen's disappointment. She then tried to recover the property, but proved unavailing. She died not long after.")

Family lore also conflicts over the exact nature of her relationship with Kawānanakoa. Kaʻiulani's niece Mabel Robertson Lucas said that the two cousins were close but only like siblings. Nancy and Jean Francis Webb's 1962 biography of Kaʻiulani says that Kawānanakoa's eventual wife told an unnamed biographer or close friend that "of course I never could have married David if Kaʻiulani had lived".

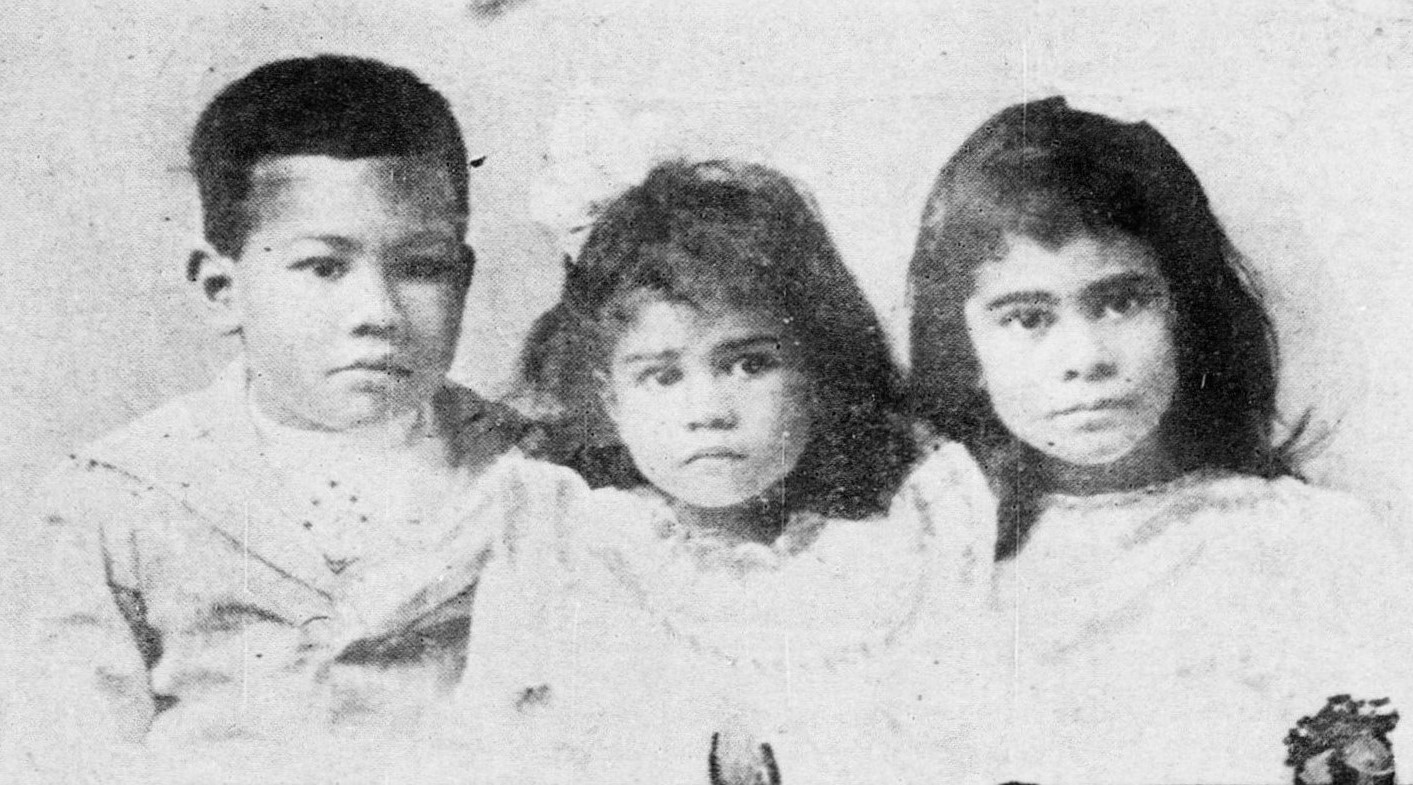
Children of David and Abigail Kawānanakoa

On January 6, 1902, Kawānanakoa married Abigail Wahiʻikaʻahuʻula Campbell in a Roman Catholic ceremony officiated by Patrick William Riordan, Archbishop of San Francisco at the Occidental Hotel. His wife was the eldest daughter of Scots-Irish industrialist James Campbell and Abigail Kuaihelani Maipinepine Bright, who refused to let her daughter marry the prince until he signed a prenuptial agreement. Two days prior, his mother-in-law had remarried to Kawānanakoa's former political rival Samuel Parker. After their marriage, Abigail assumed the courtesy title of princess. Their children were Princess Abigail Kapiʻolani (1903–1961), Prince David Kalākaua (1904–1953), and Princess Lydia Liliʻuokalani (1905–1969). His descendants which continue through his daughter Kapiʻolani are recognized by factions of the Hawaiian community as heirs to the Hawaiian throne.

Kawānanakoa converted to Roman Catholicism in 1907, no doubt through the urging of his wife.

Kawānanakoa died of pneumonia June 2, 1908, in San Francisco. After an elaborate funeral, he was buried in the Royal Mausoleum of Hawaii.

== Bibliography ==
- Alexander, William DeWitt (1896). History of Later Years of the Hawaiian Monarchy and the Revolution of 1893. Honolulu: Hawaiian Gazette Company. OCLC 11843616.
- Allen, Helena G. (1982). The Betrayal of Liliuokalani: Last Queen of Hawaii, 1838–1917. Glendale, CA: Arthur H. Clark Company. ISBN 978-0-87062-144-4. OCLC 9576325. Archived from the original on January 13, 2018.
- Cleghorn, Thomas A. K.; Cleghorn, Nellie Yarnell Maxwell; Argow, Dorothy; Allen, Katherine B. (1979). "Thomas Alexander Kaulaahi Cleghorn" (PDF). Oral History Project. Honolulu: The Watumull Foundation: 1–82. hdl:10524/48595. OCLC 10006035. Archived (PDF) from the original on June 27, 2020.
- Haley, James L. (2014). Captive Paradise: A History of Hawaii. New York: St. Martin's Press. ISBN 978-0-312-60065-5. OCLC 865158092. Archived from the original on June 13, 2020.
- Hawkins, Richard A. (2003). "Princess Abigail Kawananakoa: the Forgotten Territorial Native Hawaiian Leader". Hawaiian Journal of History. 37: 163–177. hdl:10524/354.
- Iaukea, Sydney Lehua (2012). The Queen and I: A Story of Dispossessions and Reconnections in Hawaiʻi. Berkeley: University of California Press. ISBN 978-0-520-95030-6. OCLC 763161035. Archived from the original on April 12, 2020 – via Questia.
- Joesting, Edward (1988). Kauai: The Separate Kingdom. Honolulu: University of Hawaii Press. ISBN 978-0-8248-1162-4. OCLC 154200817.
- Kam, Ralph Thomas (2017). Death Rites and Hawaiian Royalty: Funerary Practices in the Kamehameha and Kalākaua Dynasties, 1819–1953. S. I.: McFarland, Incorporated, Publishers. ISBN 978-1-4766-6846-8. OCLC 966566652. Archived from the original on December 24, 2019.
- Kamae, Lori (1980). The Empty Throne. Honolulu: Topgallant Publishing Co. ISBN 978-0-914916-44-4. OCLC 7080687.
- Kameʻeleihiwa, Lilikalā (1992). Native Land and Foreign Desires. Honolulu: Bishop Museum Press. ISBN 0-930897-59-5.
- Krauss, Bob (1994). Johnny Wilson: First Hawaiian Democrat. Honolulu: University of Hawaii Press. ISBN 978-0-8248-1577-6. OCLC 30398759.
- Kuykendall, Ralph Simpson (1967). The Hawaiian Kingdom 1874–1893, The Kalākaua Dynasty. Vol. 3. Honolulu: University of Hawaii Press. ISBN 978-0-87022-433-1. OCLC 500374815. Archived from the original on January 20, 2015.
- Liliʻuokalani (1898). Hawaii's Story by Hawaii's Queen, Liliʻuokalani. Boston: Lee & Shepard. ISBN 978-0-548-22265-2. OCLC 2387226.
- Linnea, Sharon (1999). Princess Kaʻiulani: Hope of a Nation, Heart of a People. Grand Rapids, MI: Eerdmans Young Readers. ISBN 978-0-8028-5088-1. OCLC 36727806.
- Mehmed, Ali (1998). "Hoʻohuiʻaina Pala Ka Maiʻa: Remembering Annexation One Hundred Years Ago". The Hawaiian Journal of History. 32. Honolulu: Hawaiian Historical Society: 141–154. hdl:10524/358. OCLC 60626541.
- Pukui, Mary Kawena; Elbert, Samuel H.; Mookini, Esther T. (1974). Place Names of Hawaii. Honolulu: University of Hawaii Press. ISBN 978-0-8248-0524-1. OCLC 1042464. Archived from the original on November 1, 2019.
- Quigg, Agnes (1988). "Kalakaua's Hawaiian Studies Abroad Program" (PDF). The Hawaiian Journal of History. 22. Honolulu: Hawaiian Historical Society: 170–208. hdl:10524/103. OCLC 60626541. Archived (PDF) from the original on June 27, 2020.
- Russ, William Adam (1961). The Hawaiian Republic, 1894–98, and its Struggle to Win Annexation. Selinsgrove, PA: Susquehanna University Press. OCLC 25026235.
- Schweizer, Niklaus Rudolf (1999). Turning Tide: The Ebb and Flow of Hawaiian Nationality. Berne, NY: Peter Lang. ISBN 978-3-906762-00-5. OCLC 41445703.
- Silva, Noenoe K. (2004). Aloha Betrayed: Native Hawaiian Resistance to American Colonialism. Durham: Duke University Press. doi:10.2307/j.ctv11smzsz. ISBN 0-8223-8622-4. JSTOR j.ctv11smzsz. OCLC 191222123. Archived from the original on June 26, 2020.
- Towse, Edward (1895). The Rebellion of 1895: A Complete History of the Insurrection Against the Republic of Hawaii: List of Officers and Members of the National Guard of Hawaii and the Citizen's Guard. Honolulu: The Hawaiian Star. OCLC 16334257.
- US House of Representatives; et al. (Kato, Kenneth; Litten, Joshua; Burns, Jacqueline, V.; Ethier, Grace; Hromada, Erin Marie-Lloyd; Murphy, Michael; O’Hara, Laura Turner; Rucker, Terrance) (2018). Kowalewski, Albin J. (ed.). Asian and Pacific Islander Americans in Congress, 1900–2017. Prepared under the direction of the Committee on House Administration by the Office of the Historian and the Office of the Clerk, US House of Representatives (PDF). Washington, DC: US Government Publishing Office. ISBN 978-0-16-094356-0. OCLC 1019833174.
- Van Dyke, Jon M. (2008). Who Owns the Crown Lands of Hawaiʻi?. Honolulu: University of Hawaii Press. ISBN 978-0-8248-3211-7. OCLC 163812857. Archived from the original on July 22, 2020.
- Webb, Nancy; Webb, Jean Francis (1998) [1962]. Kaʻiulani: Crown Princess of Hawaii. Honolulu: Mutual Publishing. ISBN 978-1-56647-206-7. OCLC 265217757.
