= George J. Wimberly =

American architect

George J. "Pete" Wimberly
- Born: George J. Wimberly; January 16, 1914; Ellensburg, Washington, U.S.
- Died: December 30, 1995 (aged 81); Honolulu, Hawaii, U.S.
- Education: University of Washington-Seattle
- Occupation: Architect
- Buildings: Jean Charlot House; Waikikian Hotel; Rattan Art Gallery
- Projects: Sheraton Waikïkï; Kona Hilton

George J. "Pete" Wimberly (January 16, 1914 – December 30, 1995) was an American architect known for his work in Honolulu, Hawaii and for his firm's designs of resorts. He was part of the architectural firm of Wimberly Allison Tong & Goo until his death in 1995.

Wimberly came to Hawaii in 1940 as a "journeyman architect doing naval work at Pearl Harbor." After the war he worked with Howard Cook in the architectural firm of Wimberly and Cook. The rehabilitation of the Royal Hawaiian Hotel was one of his first jobs and many more followed. His work is typified by the use of local materials such as coral stone, lava rock, wood beams, thatch, bamboo, and glass; local "forms" such as flowing indoor/outdoor open spaces sheltered by big dramatic roofs with big eaves; and "liberal use of figurations, patterns and motifs derived from the cultures of the Pacific".

An article in Honolulu Weekly said Wimberly "established himself as perhaps the most successful resort architect in the world" and that his "Honolulu—based firm of Wimberly Allison Tong & Goo, also known as WATG, designed many of the Pacific Rim's pace-setting hotels and is now the world's largest "niche" architecture firm, specializing in the $4-trillion-dollar travel industry." He did numerous small scale projects on the Hawaiian islands until after 1960 when tourism and travel greatly expanded tourism and he started working on larger projects, a "construction boom that... led to the demolition of" many buildings Wimberly designed.

He was "instrumental" in founding the Pacific Asia Travel Association in 1952 with Bill Mullahey, the regional chief of Pan American Airlines, after traveling the Pacific in the 1950s "looking for new destinations, new hotel opportunities" in Australia, New Zealand, Tahiti, Fiji, Jakarta, Singapore, and Bali.

Wimberly was an avid outdoorsman, according to his working partner of 27 years, Donald Goo. He relocated to Southern California late in life before returning to Honolulu when he became terminally ill with emphysema.

== Projects ==
- Jean Charlot House Honolulu, Hawaii
- Waikikian Hotel (1956)
- Top's, Coco's and Popo's coffee shops built with "lots of lava rock and an almost cartoonish South-Seas flair."
- Hotel Bora Bora that includes thatched huts built on stilts the edge of a lagoon in Tahiti.
- Bishop Bank in Waikiki (1951)
- Kau Kau Jr. hamburger stand on Nimitz Highway (1956) that included a "little glass kitchen huddled beneath a fantastical, arrow-shaped, concrete-slab roof was certainly Honolulu's most fanciful small building."
- Royal Theater (1962) ("shortlived")
- Don the Beachcomber bar/restaurant with "big, authentic thatched roofs" on Kaläkaua Avenue
- Kalakaua Avenue Shops
- original International Market Place
- Duke Kahanamoku's night club, "where Don Ho sang and drank through his salad days."
- Bishop National Bank that includes a mural by Jean Charlot (1959)
- McInerny department store (1959) and an earlier building on the same site.
- Royal Hawaiian Shopping Arcade wooden crescent(1960)
- Rattan Art Gallery, a "cooly modernist" building (1947)
- Canlis' Restaurant (1954)
- Kapi'olani Bowl building on Kapi'olani Boulevard at Ward Avenue (1958), demolished in 1996
- Valley of the Temples Chapel in 'Ähuimanu on the Windward Side (1965)
- Foodland supermarket at Windward Shopping Center (1953) in Käne'ohe.
- Bank of Hawai'i building, 15-stories (1966)
- Sheraton Waikïkï
- Sheraton Maui "clinging to the side of a prominent rock outcropping at Kaanapali Beach" (1963)
- Kona Hilton, a "primitivist, bony, whitewashed" building "built on a rocky point at Kailua Bay on the Big Island" (1968).
- Pago Pago Inter-Continental Hotel with its "authentically constructed thatch beach fale" in American Samoa.
- Tahara'a Hotel which is "no taller than three-quarters of a coconut palm" and spills "down a lush hillside above Matavai Bay" in Tahiti.

== Firm's projects ==
- Atlantis in the Bahamas
- Atlantis in Dubai
- Disneyland Hotel (Paris)
- Emirates Palace in Abu Dhabi (2001)
- Encore Las Vegas
- Hawaii Convention Center
- Hilton Waterfront Beach Resort
- Legoland Windsor
- Royal Hawaiian Center
