= Royal Hawaiian =

Royal Hawaiian may refer to:

- Royal Hawaiian Hotel, Honolulu
- Royal Hawaiian Center, a retail complex in Waikiki
- Royal Hawaiian Band, the oldest and only full-time municipal band in the United States

== See also ==
- Ali'i, the hereditary highest class of Hawaiian society
