= Edward M. Brownlee =

American artist (1929–2013)

Edward Malcolm Brownlee (1929–2013) was an American sculptor known for his modernist architectural creations with a style influenced by the art of Oceania, Asia, and the Pacific Northwest. He is best known for his work in Hawaii, where he was a frequent collaborator with architect Pete Wimberly.

== Life ==
"Mick" Brownlee was born in Portland, Oregon, on April 23, 1929, and grew up there on the west side in a dilapidated neighborhood where he found many remnants of building materials lying about and began making constructions from them. He joined the Army after three years of high school and was stationed overseas in occupied Japan working as a topographer. Brownlee received his formal education at Oregon State University and at the California College of Arts and Crafts. In 1954, he became the first recipient of a Master of Fine Arts degree from the University of Hawaiʻi. The Hawaii chapter of the American Institute of Architects recognized Brownlee with a special award for “outstanding contributions of art to architecture”.

He is known for doing many of the carvings for Donn Beach at his restaurants and for the original International Market Place, as well as at many other buildings across Hawaii.

Brownlee wrote an article titled "Art: The Complete Education" discussing his thoughts on the teaching of art as a discipline.

He maintained a studio on the Oregon Coast and worked in carved stone and cast bronze until his death on November 24, 2013.

== Works ==
Brownlee’s monumental sculptures may be found in Alaska, Oregon, British Columbia, Fiji, and Hawaii. In Honolulu, Hawaii, they are located at the Ala Moana Center, the Honolulu International Airport, River Street Mall, the library of Punahou School, and Orvis Auditorium at the University of Hawaiʻi at Mānoa. The 19 foot cast stone sculpture T'sung is typical of his outdoor sculptures. The Honolulu Museum of Art and the Hawaii State Art Museum are among the public collections holding work by Edward M. Brownlee. Some of his works can be viewed online at the Public Art Archive.
