= George Tapan =

Filipino photographer

- Other names: Georgegraphic
- Citizenship: Filipino
- Occupation: Travel photographer
- Spouse: Lisa Tapan
- Children: Harold Tapan; Harvey Tapan
- Awards: National Geographic Photo Contest (2011); PATA Gold Awards; ASEAN Tourism Association Award

George Tapan is a Filipino photographer. He is known for winning the National Geographic Photo Contest in 2011. Tapan has worked in the photography industry for over 50 years. He is often referred to by the nickname "Georgegraphic" due to his work documenting Philippine culture and tourism.

== Early life ==
Tapan is a third-generation photographer. His father moved from Quezon to Manila to work as an assistant photographer who documented the ruins of the capital city after it was leveled by war. Tapan began his professional photography career at the age of 19. During the 1960s, he worked as a photographer for movie posters. He took still photos for films featuring Filipino actors such as Joseph Estrada, Fernando Poe Jr., and Dolphy. Tapan also served as a campaign photographer for Joseph Estrada when Estrada ran for mayor of San Juan.

== Career ==
At the age of 24, Tapan shifted his professional focus to travel photography. His first travel assignment took place on Isla Verde, located between Batangas and Puerto Galera. Throughout his career, he has worked for the Philippine Department of Tourism and Philippine Airlines. His photographs have appeared on the covers of Mabuhay magazine. One of his notable magazine covers featured the Mayon Volcano, which he climbed with the assistance of an elderly guide.

Tapan has published five books on travel photography. He advocates for authenticity in his work and advises photographers not to use heavy post-processing or digital manipulation. His photographic style often involves including local people in landscape shots to provide cultural context. He is a member of the Press Photographers of the Philippines (PPP).

== Awards and recognition ==
In 2011, Tapan won first place in the Places category of the National Geographic Photo Contest. The winning entry was a photograph titled "Into the Green Zone". The image was taken on Onuk Island in Balabac, Palawan. The photo featured a rainbow, a boatman, and a woman with flowing hair. Contest judges, including photographer Peter Essick, noted the composition of the image and the detail of the subject's hair. Tapan stated that he entered the contest to showcase the beauty of the Philippines rather than poverty.

Tapan has received two Gold awards from the Pacific Asia Travel Association. He is also a recipient of an award from the ASEAN Tourism Association.

== Personal life ==
Tapan is married to Lisa. They have two sons, Harold and Harvey, who also work as professional photographers. Harold focuses on corporate photography, while Harvey works in travel and advertising photography. Tapan stated that he did not formally teach his sons photography because he wanted them to develop their own identities in the field. Tapan has expressed plans to establish a local museum of photography to display his work and the work of other Filipino photographers.
