= Coco Palms Resort =

Resort hotel in Wailuā, Kauaʻi, Hawaiʻi

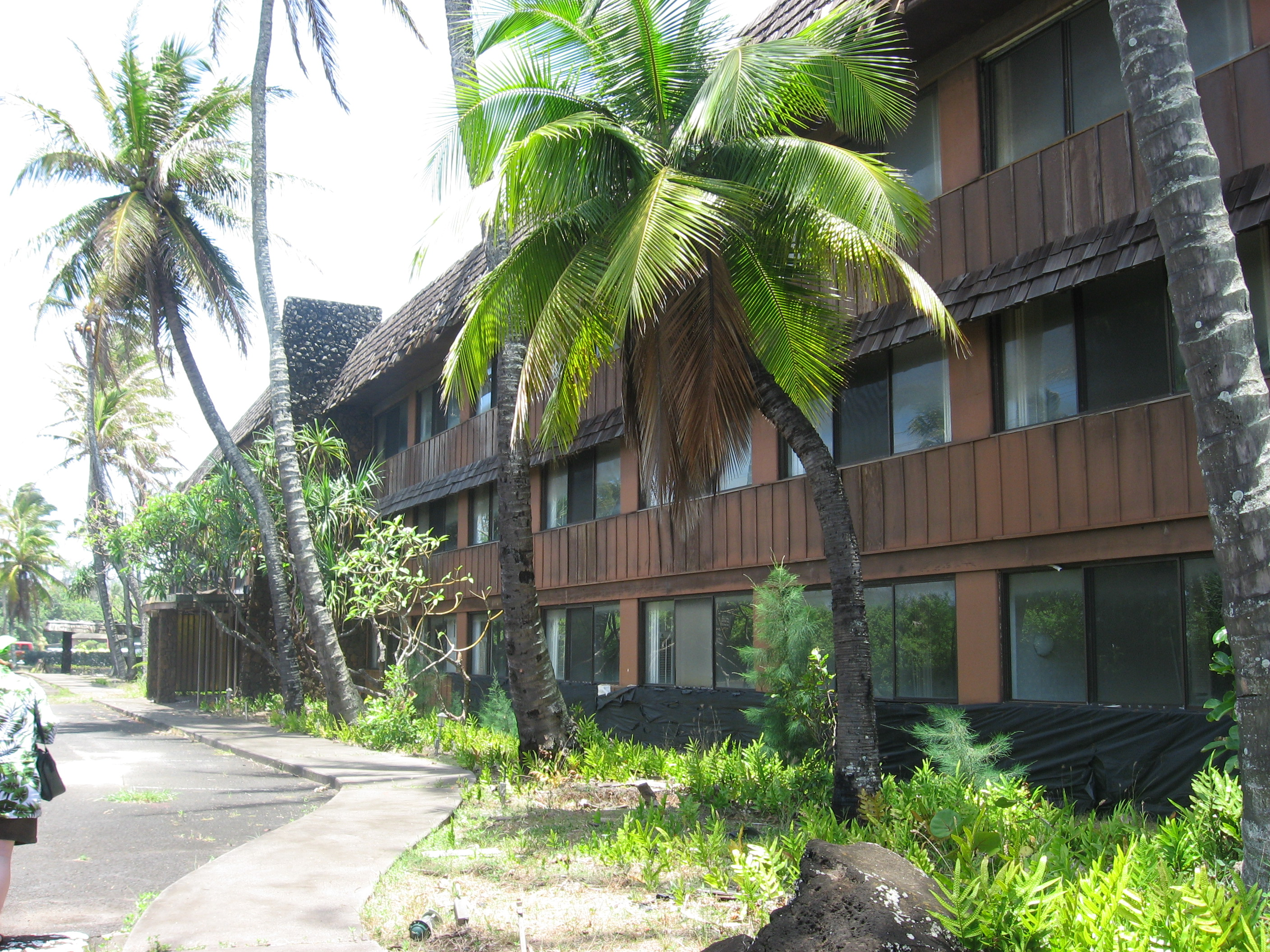
- One of the Coco Palms hotel buildings, 2006

- Location within Hawaii
- 22.049294°N 159.33586°W
- Location: Wailuā, Kauaʻi, Hawaiʻi

History
- Built: 1953

Hawaiʻi Register of Historic Places
- Designated: May 15, 2020
- Reference no.: 50-30-08-02402

Coco Palms Resort was a resort hotel in Wailuā, Kauaʻi, Hawaiʻi, that was noted for its Hollywood connections, Hawaiian-themed weddings, torch lighting ceremonies, destruction by a hurricane, and long-standing land disputes. The resort includes or is near to many culturally significant spots and the sites of some of the most important legends and historical events for Native Hawaiians.

The land is ancient Hawaiian royal property that has been in dispute since 1866. In that year, Junius Kaae, along with Kapiolani, Kalakaua, and others filed a petition seeking to revoke the will of Kealiiahonui, which had been filed in probate by Levi Haʻalelea in 1855. The petition was eventually overturned by Sanford B. Dole almost immediately after the overthrow of the Kingdom of Hawaii. Dole acted as a justice of the supreme court of the provincial government after stepping down from the bench and then being seated as president of the Republic of Hawaii. Litigants were made to sign an agreement for this adjudication to be allowed by Dole.

Lyle Guslander leased the site of Coco Palms from the Territory of Hawaii in 1952; the resort opened in early 1953. The hotel manager, Grace Buscher, took control of marketing the hotel as a Hawaiian-style getaway for tourists. A number of films were shot on location at Coco Palms, including Elvis Presley's film Blue Hawaii. The hotel made a big business out of Hawaiian-style weddings for decades. Buscher started a tradition, still in use at hotels throughout the islands, known at the hotel as the torch-lighting ceremony. Buscher also initiated a tree-planting ceremony to replenish the old coconut grove and honor individuals of note.

Coco Palms was destroyed by Hurricane Iniki in 1992. In 2016, Honolulu developers GreeneWaters LLC formed a partnership, Coco Palms Hui LLC, to restore the resort. Their intent was to reopen Coco Palms "as part of Hyatt's Unbound Collection." In 2019 the project collapsed. RP21 Coco Palms LLC, also known as Reef Capital Partners, plans to construct a 350-room resort to be completed in 2026.

== Background and history ==
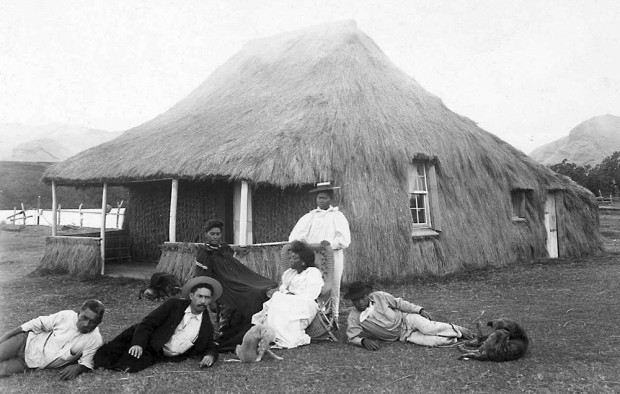
A home on the property of aliʻi Kekaihaakulou (Deborah Kapule) around 1900. Kapule lived near the Wailua River and was well known for taking in guests.

The area around the mouth of the Wailua River is well known to Hawaiians as a place of many legends and events of historical, cultural, and religious significance. It is the landing place of the Kahiki voyagers, who came ashore at Kauaʻi in about 500 AD, and the location of Hawaiian legends like the prophet Naula-a-Maihea and the origins of the Naha stone. According to the book The Story of the Coco Palms Hotel, by David P. Penhallow, the Coco Palms Resort sits on an ancient site of Hawaiian royalty and hospitality situated at the mouth of the Wailua River on the eastern side of Kauai.

=== Kaumualii and Kekaihaʻakūlou (Deborah Kapule) ===
In 1810 the monarch of Kauaʻi, Kaumualii (c. 1778–May 26, 1824), negotiated a peaceful agreement that allowed the island to become a part of Kamehameha I's new Kingdom of Hawaii, while still allowing Kaumualii to remain the ruler. The agreement established Kamehameha's son Liholiho as supreme monarch. After Kamehameha I's death, a council was held in July 1821 with Kaumualii and Liholiho, now styled as "Kamehameha II" along with the top chiefs and advisors. Kamehameha II decided to continue his father's arrangements. For this, Kaumualii asked the new monarch to take some Kauaʻi lands for his wives, to appease Liholiho's guardians. While Kamehameha II refused to do so—stating that his father had left no instructions about the land, only that he should be the supreme monarch—he did take Kaumualii's wife Kekaihaʻakūlou as one of his own wives and gave his wife Kekāuluohi to his most trusted advisor, Charles Kanaʻina, as a way to please the chiefs. It is believed the council decision displeased the new Kuhina Nui, Kaʻahumanu. A year later, she would take Kaumualii and later his son Kealiiahonui as her husbands, using the teachings of the missionaries on marriage, to make herself their heirs.

After Kaumualii was kidnapped, Kekaihaʻakūlou (now known as Deborah Kapule) owned a home on the banks of the river where travelers knew they were always welcome, long before any hotel existed on the island. She had converted to Christianity and remarried Simeon Kaiu, who was to become an instructor for the missionaries. The couple had a son, Josiah Kaumualii, and in 1837, in order that to be closer to their own estates, they moved an entire retinue of people to Wailuā. Shortly after relocating, Kaiu died from a stroke. Historian James Jarvis traveled up the river with Kapule in a double-hulled canoe in 1837, climbing to the top of Wailua Falls. Jarvis wrote: "She lived in a beautiful spot ... that looked more like park scenery than any work of nature." It was a large house that became open to visitors in 1823. It would become known as Deborah's Inn, where Kapule would entertain for twenty years. In the 1840s Kapule played host to the Protestant missionaries and the first Catholic priest on the island. By 1853, Deborah Kapule had moved to the other side of Kauaʻi and died, and the property began to rapidly deteriorate. George Washington Bates found the residence in complete disrepair, with the canoes, which had previously transported guests up the river, rotting in a shed. Several dilapidated buildings were left abandoned, including a small church. The villagers around the area continued to grow taro and care for the fishponds.

=== Kingdom Supreme Court probate decisions ===
Kealiiahonui was the son of Kaumualii, who died on approximately June 23, 1849. On January 25, 1855, Levi Haʻalelea petitioned the Hawaiian Supreme Court as a beneficial representative of the estate of Kekauʻōnohi, for whom he was the sole heir as her widower. Haʻalelea had possession of the will of Kealiiahonui, stating that Kekauʻōnohi was the monarch's sole heir but had also died before the petition. He filed the will into probate on February 16 of that same year. On July 2, 1866, a petition was filed on behalf of Kapiolani, her husband David Kalakaua, Poomaikelani and her husband Hiram Kahanawai, Victoria Kinoiki Kekaulike and her husband David Kahalepouli Piikoi, Kaluaipihana and her husband F. W. Malaihi, and a minor named Kamehaokalani through F. W. Malaihi. The case, involving the future king and queen and associates, was dismissed on November 30, 1866.

In the case of the "ESTATE OF KEALIIAHONUI, Deceased. Appeal From Bickerton, J." of June 17, 1890, involving the amended petition of Junius Kaae, Haʻalelea's widow Amoe Ululani Kapukalakala Ena (1842–1904), represented by F. M. Hatch, made a plea in bar stating that the court had already delivered a judgement dismissing the case in 1866. Bickerton's decision stated: "After careful examination of this case, and of the authorities, I consider that the petitioner is estopped from what would amount to a re-hearing of the original petition.... The plea in bar is sustained." The full decision of the court read: "We support the decision appealed from.... [T]he application of one desirous of suing as a next friend of a minor, was substantially complied with. The Judge's order for the issue of process, endorsed upon the petition, was a sufficient 'sanction' or authority for the person desirous of acting as the next friend of the minor to act throughout the proceedings in such capacity. Moreover, the minor in question was joined with several adult plaintiffs, and all were represented by counsel, and the case heard upon its merits. There is no claim that the case was not fully and adequately presented and tried."

=== Reversal by Dole acting as justice while president of provisional government ===
According to "IN THE MATTER OF THE ESTATE OF KEALIIAHONUI, Deceased. PETITION FOR REVOGATION OF ORDER ADMITTING WILL TO PROBATE, AND APPOINTMENT or ADMINISTRATOR. APPEAL FROM DOLE, J. HEARING, FEBRUARY 23, 1893. DECISION, JUNE 2, 1893", The petition reads as follows: "An executor of a deceased wife's estate filed a petition to revoke an order admitting to probate the will of K., who it was claimed was the uncle of petitioner's executrix, and a plea in bar thereto was sustained. (8 Hawl 93.) The same person filed another petition with the same object, claiming to be a purchaser of the rights of another person alleged to be a niece and heir of the testator, K. A party in interest pleads the former proceedings in bar. The plea is overruled." Junius Kaae was the petitioner who had filed a similar petition in 1890, along with Kapiolani, Kalakaua, and others, which was given a judgment dismissing it, pleaded in bar, and sustained upon appeal of the full court. Levi Haʻalelea's widow, A. A. Haʻalelea (Amoe Ululani Kapukalakala Ena), pleaded the last proceeding in bar to the present (at that time) proceedings as "that in a proceeding heretofore had in this Court in which said J unius Kaae was a party, the identical matter now set up by said Kaae was litigated and a judgment rendered against him." The plea in bar this time was overruled. When the decision was adjudicated, both litigants were required to sign an agreement allowing Justice/President of the Provisional Government of Hawaii Sanford B. Dole to continue to adjudicate even though he was no longer seated on the high court but president of the Provisional Government of Hawaii after the Overthrow of the Kingdom of Hawaii. The court wrote, "Now, therefore, it is hereby agreed that the said Honorable S. B. Dole may participate in, make, sign, file and enter a decision and judgment in this cause, upon said appeal, in like manner as though he were still in commission as a Justice of said Court."

=== Coconut grove ===
Although believed to have been a royal grove, the coconut grove was planted in 1896 by William Lindemann, a German immigrant, to harvest oil and copra (dried coconut meat). Lindemann hoped to someday operate a vast copra empire, but he was unaware of how long the trees took to mature, and the plantation was a failure. Today the vast coconut groves along the coastline are often referred to as the Coconut Coast, with many of the trees outliving their expected lifespan but thinning out over time.

== Former hotels ==
=== Early lodge ===
By the early 1950s, the site was home to a small businessmen's lodge, owned and operated by an elderly widow named Veda Warner Hills. She had advertised for the sale of the site in 1952, which was answered by Lyle Lowell Guslander, known in the tourist industry as Gus. Guslander had made a reputation for himself as "cantankerous", "ornery", and "brilliant". He was a former assistant manager of the Palace Hotel in San Francisco, California, and arrived in Hawaii in 1947 to manage the Niumalu Hotel (Hilton Hawaiian Village) but was fired by Walter Child, who was known to be equally unpredictable. He then began working for the Moana Hotel, beginning as assistant manager and eventually becoming general manager. Guslander asked his friend Henry Buscher to investigate the property for him, but Buscher, a liquor distributor, returned a negative report because he could not purchase a drink there. Although Guslander did not have the funds to purchase the property outright, he managed to get a lease with the option to buy from the Territory of Hawaii.

=== Island Holidays Ltd. ===
On January 25, 1953, the Coco Palms lodge opened with 24 rooms, five employees, and two guests. The lodge consisted of the main residence, which had been converted into the former businessmen's lodge, with eight rooms, and an additional 16 rooms in a reconfigured army surplus barracks. The entire property was set in front of the beach and encompassed 35 acres (14 ha), with over 2,000 coconut trees remaining from the former Lindemann coconut plantation. Guslander hired Grace Buscher to assist him with the management of the new lodge. Although she had no previous experience, Grace was creative and had a good understanding of buyer psychology. During this early period, the hotel still had a sugarcane train running past the front of the property. The hotel was run by Island Holidays Ltd., which was owned and operated by Guslander as president. The group also included William Newport, Bill Mullahey, and Grace Buscher, who became the general manager of the hotel. Mullahey was a regional director for Pan American Airlines. In an interview to the Garden Island newspaper, Mullahey announced the company's plans to expand and create a Hawaiian atmosphere. Development started immediately, and by 1956 the lodge had converted into a cottage-style hotel with 82 rooms. That same year, Guslander removed ten of the cottages to build a 24-room wing to the hotel, increasing its capacity to 96 rooms.

=== Torch lighting, Hollywood, weddings, and tree plantings ===
Postcard depicting local Hawaiian residents enacting the torch lighting ceremony at the Coco Palms Resort

While the exact origins of a Hawaiian torch-lighting ceremony are unknown, the use of this incarnation of Hawaiian culture, performed at many Hawaiian hotels, began at the Coconut Palms Hotel, with Grace Buscher making the first call. The ceremony would become a big part of the Coco Palms story. Hawaiians dressed in a traditional malo would blow a conch shell and beat a drum, as the call was answered by one man running across the coconut grove, lighting torches on his way until the entire lagoon was lit. In the book Kauai: 100 Years in Postcards, author Stormy Cozad states that while the torch-lighting ceremony was synonymous with the Coco Palms, it was not a true Hawaiian ceremony but a dramatic call to dinner for guests. Bits of Hawaiian culture displayed as parts of Hawaiian history were narrated during the lighting. Postcards from the time depict a number of local Hawaiian residents performing the ceremony, including Sebastian Alalem blowing the conch shell, Willie Carrillo beating the drum, and John Keleohi lighting the torch. The event would be followed by an hour-long Polynesian-themed show in the dining room. Bruscher had a firepit built for roasting a pig in full view of guests to entice them into the Lagoon Dining Room, one of three dining areas at the hotel, helping to distract them from the passing train. Another longtime employee was entertainer Larry Rivera, who began at the hotel as a waiter before it became the Coco Palms.

Hollywood took an interest in the Coco Palms, beginning in May 1953 with the filming of Miss Sadie Thompson, starring Rita Hayworth. The Chapel in the Palm was built by the studio in the Coconut Grove specifically for this production. The film was shot in Technicolor and 3D on location in and around the Coco Palms property and the Wailua River. Along with Hayworth were actors Jose Ferrer and Aldo Ray, director Curtis Bernhardt, and the entire crew of the production also staying at the hotel. Using the Hollywood chapel, Grace Buscher would invent the Hawaiian wedding for tourists. In 1926 Charles E. King wrote the song "Ke Kali Nei Au" (Waiting There for Thee) for the musical production The Prince of Hawaii. The song was originally recorded in 1928 by Helen Desha Beamer, with its original Hawaiian-language lyrics. It was then recorded in 1951 by Bing Crosby with an English translation. In 1958 Al Hoffman and Dick Manning wrote additional English lyrics for Andy Williams. Now called "Hawaiian Wedding Song", it was featured prominently in the film Blue Hawaii, starring Elvis Presley, whose character is married at the lagoon at the Coco Palms in the finale. The hotel made a big business of selling "Blue Hawaii" weddings that recreated the floating wedding ceremony depicted in the film. Extras for this wedding package included two singers performing "Hawaiian Wedding Song" and a conch shell blower. The hotel looked a lot like a movie set, with similar details such as cement coco palm pillars.

Another ceremony established by Buscher was the Coco Palms tree-planting ceremony. The idea was to help replenish the trees that had begun to die in the grove planted by Lindeman. It was established on May 10, 1955, to honor notable people from Kauai, Hawaii, and around the world. The first tree planting was for a local radio personality named Webley Edwards of the show Hawaii Calls. The ceremonies continued until 1980 and ended with the 127th tree planting, for architect John Gregg Allerton. Others who have had trees planted in their name include Duke Kahanamoku, Gene Autry, Liberace, James A. Michener, ʻIolani Luahine (Kumu hula), and the Kawānanakoa ohana (family).

=== Hurricane Iniki and closure ===
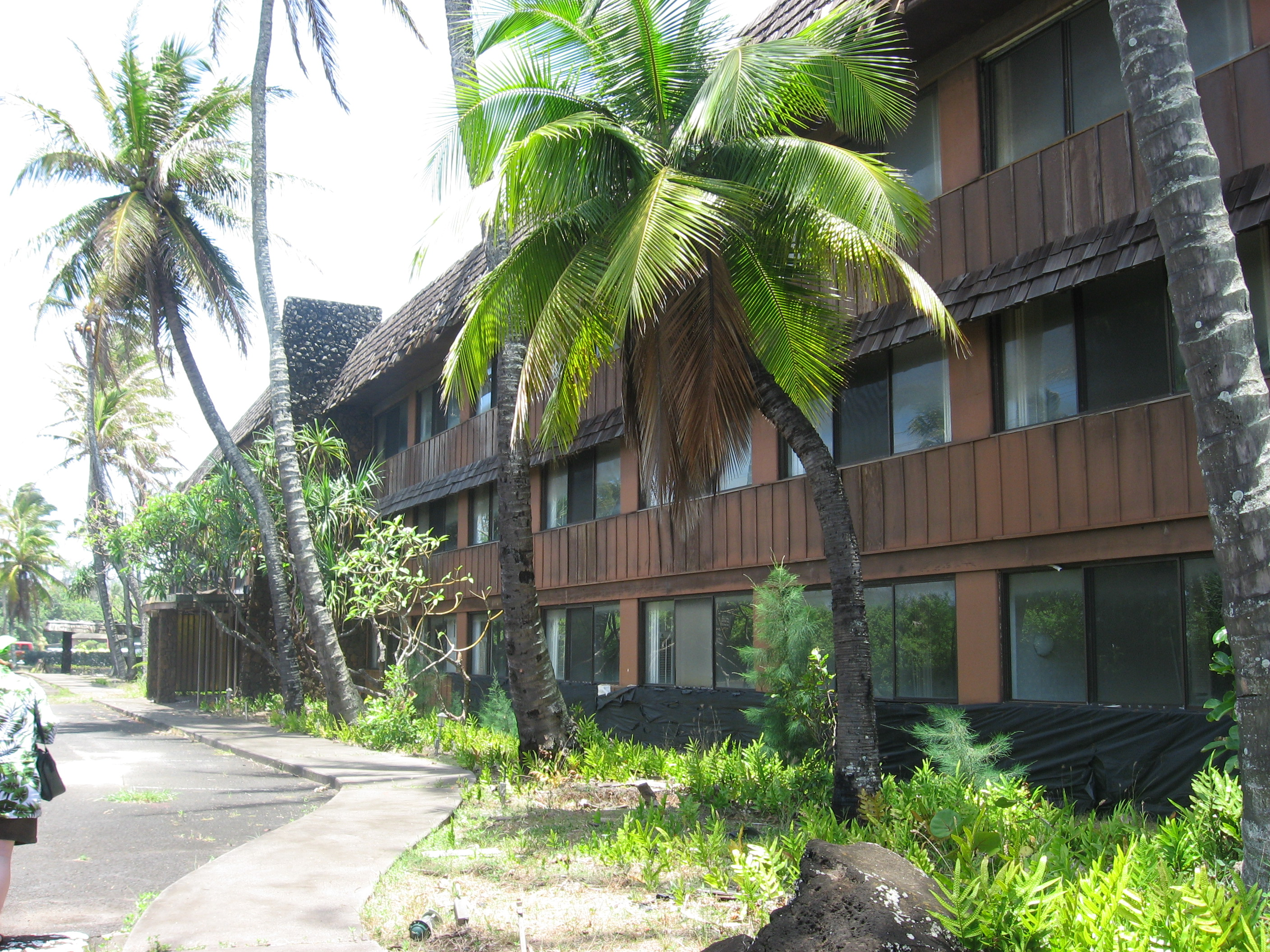
A building of the Coco Palms Resort with numerous rooms near the lobby.

The resort has been closed since being hit by Hurricane Iniki in 1992. Even though the hotel was closed, tours through the grounds continued with Hawaii Movie Tours, which was sold to Robert's Hawaii in 2011. Bob Jasper, the former owner of the tour, greeted guests regularly with occasional entertainment by Larry Rivera, who recounted stories of playing and touring with Elvis. Jasper also served as caretaker of the grounds. On July 4, 2014, the resort caught fire. No one was injured, and the fire was controlled by early afternoon.

== Purchase by Coco Palms Hui LLC ==
In 2013, Coco Palms Hui LLC was incorporated. The company is run by Chad Waters and Tyler Greene, who hired Agor Architects as their design firm and Unlimited Construction as their general contractor. Coco Palms Ventures, based in Maryland, had purchased the property in 2005, and it transferred the 20 acres (8 ha) for $11.2 million to Prudential Insurance as the lender. The buyers, Waters and Greene, estimated the cost to rebuild the hotel and restaurants at over $100 million.

=== Coco Palms occupation ===
Noa Mau-Espirito, a student of Kauaʻi immersion schools and 2009 graduate of Kapaa High School who has studied ʻōlelo Hawaiʻi since his childhood, began occupying a portion of the Coco Palms resort in early 2016. After researching his genealogy and the history of the local land, Mau-Espirito discovered a link to the area. With help from others, he began to plant taro and other traditional plants, care for burials and the nearby heiau, and clear a roadway of overgrowth with the goal of "living self-sustainably" on the land. Mau-Espirito and his cousin Kamuela Kapule O Kamehameha believed a royal patent, called a Palapala Sila Nui, gave their family land rights in perpetuity. Mau-Espirito stated: "Because my bloodline goes straight to Kaumualii, because Kamu's bloodline goes straight to Kapule, we have vested rights and vested interests in this land that nobody can take away from us." A number of other kanaka maoli, some of whom were formerly homeless or descendants of Kauaʻi royalty, joined in his efforts. The group had encounters with police several times, but Kamuela believes this is a civil matter.

An attempt was made by Coco Palms Hui to evict the group and ban them from the property, calling them "squatters" and filing trespass complaints with the Kauaʻi Police Department on February 11 and March 11, 2017. However, on May 17, Judge Michael Soong of the Fifth Circuit Court denied Coco Palms Hui's ex parte motion to remove the families, ruling that property ownership had not yet been fully determined.

This situation closely follows arrests in Wainiha, on Kauaʻi's Northern Coast, involving similar land claim assertions, and Facebook CEO Mark Zuckerberg's attempt to clear hundreds of ancient land titles from his 700-acre (280 ha) Pilaa, Kauai, compound, including Pilaa Beach, which angered many Native Hawaiians, triggering international attention to the land issues on Kauaʻi and in Hawaiʻi as a whole.

In 2016, GreeneWaters LLC, operating as the Coco Palms Hui, in conjunction with Hyatt Development's Unbound program, began demolition of the old structures in preparation for construction of a new resort. Tyler Greene, the lead developer, said, "Our mantra on this has been to honor the past and celebrate the future." Reef Capital took over the property in 2018.

=== Loan defaults ===
In March 2019, the redevelopment efforts of GreeneWaters LLC collapsed. The two Utah based companies, Stillwater Equity Partners and the lender Reef PCG who are financing the sale of the Coco Palms, stated that the property had gone into default. The 11.2 million dollar loan had not been paid and the land was faced with foreclosure. The site of the Coco Palms sits on 20 acres of land which consists of the land being sold but also an additional 14.8 acres leased by the State of Hawaii since 1983. These lease rights cannot be conveyed to another party without approval by the board of the Department of Land and Natural Resources. According to Aaron Gerszewski, an asset manager with Stillwater, the collapse of the project had begun to evolve over a two-year period as GreeneWaters LLC. was unable to fulfill funding commitments to keep the property out of default. Foreclosure proceedings had not begun but are the next step if funding cannot be found. According to Stillwater Equity Partners, the majority of the capital GreenWaters had was from loans by Reef PCG. This initial loan was to be paid off when GreenWaters received a construction loan but they failed to achieve that and defaulted on the PCG loan. In order to avoid further litigation that might create more delays for the project an arrangement has been made between GreeneWaters LLC and Reef PCG that puts Stillwater Equity Partners as managers of the Coco Palms Hui LLC in exchange for one last chance for GreeneWaters to formalize a plan and find funding. The companies quickly put the property back up for sale. Tyler Greene, managing partner of GreeneWaters LLC stated that they; “decided to put the property on the market in order to give a willing and able buyer or a joint venture partner an opportunity to step in and move faster than the project is currently going.” Stillwater stated that they were looking both nationally and internally for buyers with hotel experience but that they were also exploring other options to; “maximize the value for existing shareholders.”

=== Private Capitol Group foreclosure lawsuit ===
On June 4, 2019, the Utah-based company Private Capitol Group filed a civil foreclosure lawsuit in the Fifth Circuit Court of Hawaii naming Coco Palms Hui LLC and its managers, Chad Waters and Tyler Greene, as defendants. Private Capitol Group asked the court for a forced sale to use the proceeds to pay back lenders. According to the complaint, the loan given to Waters and Greene was to be repaid in full by February 2017 plus 12% interest. The suit alleged that the terms of the loan were violated within months of the money being accepted. A letter attached to the foreclosure complaint sent to the pair explained that loan went into default in October 2016 with the failure to deposit 5 million dollars into an escrow account as agreed. The letter accused Waters and Greene of; “false representations” to the financier and that the full debt remained unpaid; “despite repeated attempts to work with you on a solution,” which included a lengthy period before foreclosure proceeding were initiated.

On July 26, 2021, at the Fifth Circuit Courthouse in Lihu‘e, the property was auctioned off and sold to a single bid of twenty-two million dollars by the Private Capital Group. The bid was subject to a confirmation hearing in which further bids could be considered if qualified bidders pay a minimum of five percent above Private Capitol Group's bid, amounting to $23.3 million. At the time of the sale no confirmation hearing had been set. Local attorney Scott Batterman, representing the Salt Lake City buyers Mitchell Burton and Victor Kimbell, stated that if the sale was confirmed it was premature to say what would be done with the property. When asked about the auction of the Coco Palms site, Governor David Ige stated;

"I’m supportive of whoever acquires the property in working with them to really look at what the needs of Kaua‘i are. We are hoping that we can make progress in whether it’s affordable housing or shelters for homelessness or whatever the purchaser might want to do. It is definitely sad to see such an important asset being wasted for so many years".

The State land board ordered Coco Palms Ventures LLC in April 2023 to immediately stop the unpermitted clearing of trees. The company responded that the lease allows and requires them to maintain the grove according to modern nursery practices, including removing any diseased trees.

== Ola Wailuanui ==
Ola Wailuanui is a community organization that had gathered a petition of signatures in hopes of purchasing the Coco Palms site. The group would like to see the site used for educational and cultural practices.

According to Gary Hooser of The Garden Island, in reference to the foreclosure sale; "The bottom line is that the “bank/lender” took back the property from the prior would-be developers", "As has been the case in previous attempts to develop the property, the deal-makers were never able to make the deal work." Hooser notes that the site is deeply sacred, the birthplace of kings and queens. The lands once held royal compounds, a royal birthing site and other religious sites. Hooser feels that the overwhelming opinion of most of Kauai's community is for no hotel, resort, timeshare or luxury homes of any kind. A petition of 10,000 names has been collected of people opposed to development. Hooser states that; "From political leaders to the business community to the grassroots, the people of Kaua‘i are united on this one". Even the Coconut Coastal Resort Association support the use of the land as an acultural/educational center.

== 2009 native burials complaint ==
In 2009 Waldeen K. Palmeira and the Native Hawaiian Legal Corporation attempted to seek a preliminary injunction and summary judgment against the Department of Transportation for a widening project that involved a portion of the Coco Palms property.
