= International Market Place =

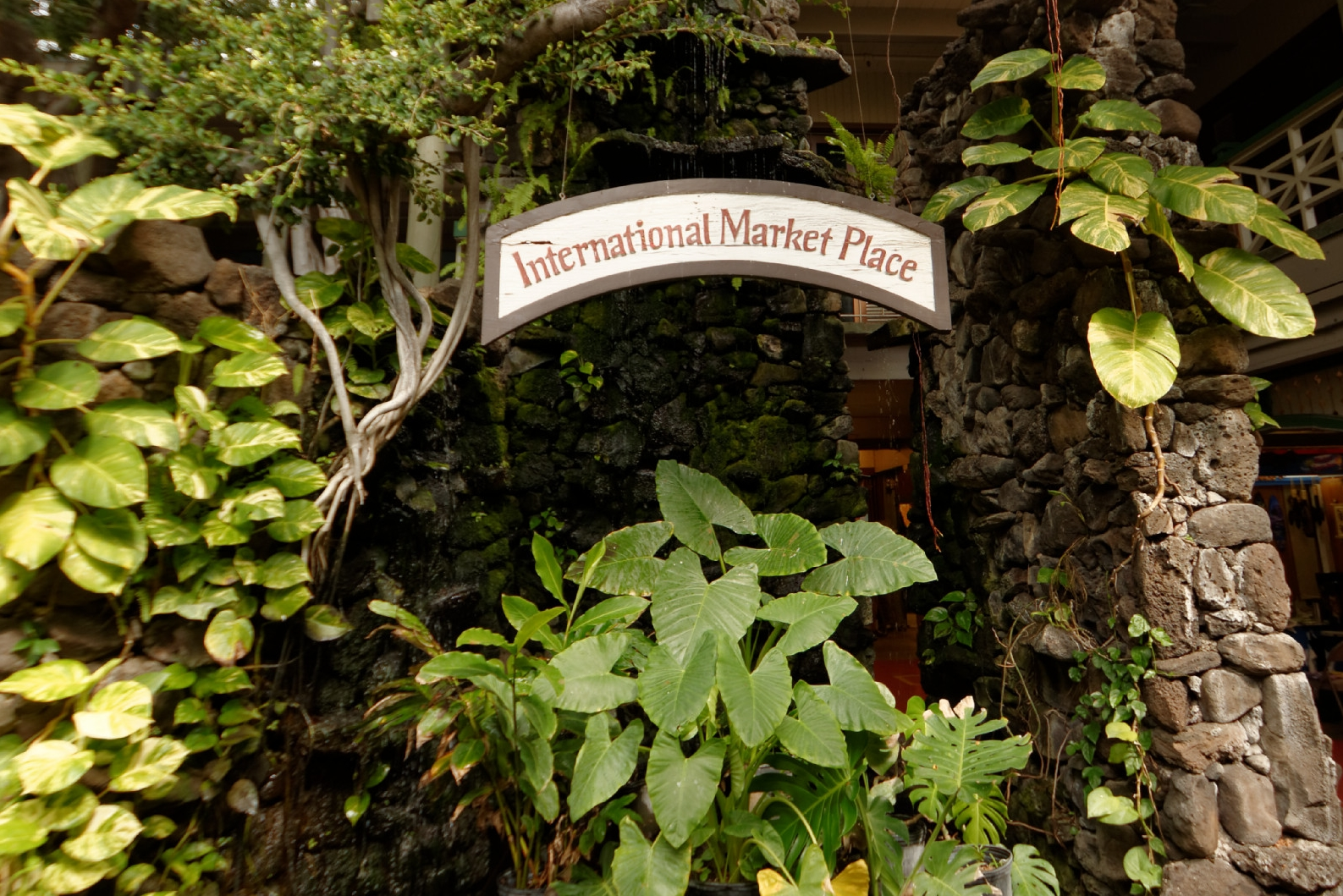
- Location: Waikiki, Oahu, Hawaii
- Coordinates: 21.2776233°N 157.8269007°W
- Address: 2330 Kalakaua Avenue Honolulu, HI 96815
- Opened: 1956; re-opening, August 25, 2016
- Developer: Taubman and CoastWood Capital Group
- Num. of stores: 90
- Num. of anchor tenants: 1 (Target)
- Floor area: 345,000 square feet
- Floors: 3
- Parking: 700
- Website: shopinternationalmarketplace.com

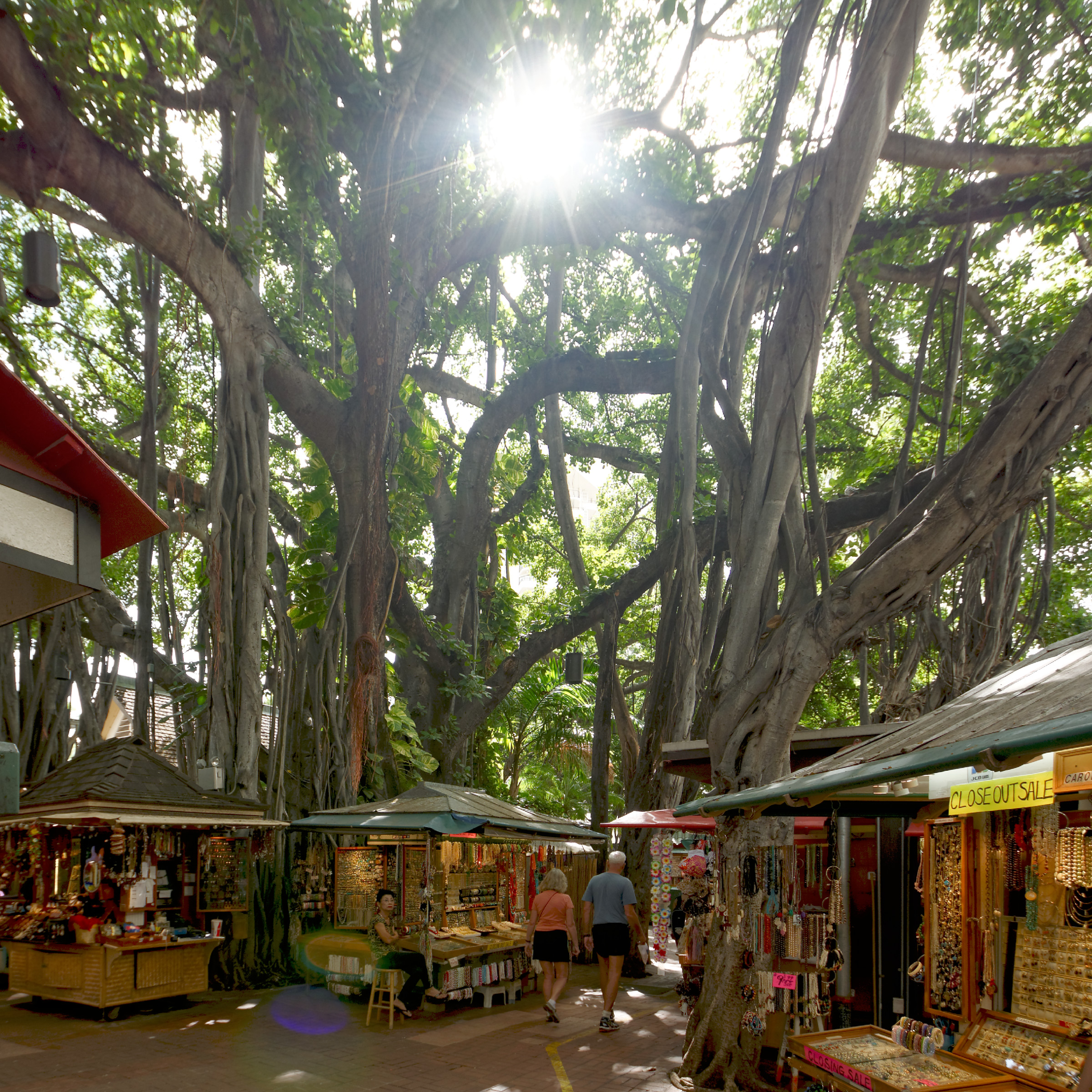
Grand Re-Opening day at the International Marketplace

The original treehouse occupied by Donn Beach in the International Marketplace

International Market Place is an open-air shopping center located in Waikīkī on the island of O‘ahu. It first opened in 1956 as a commercial, retail and entertainment center. After closing for complete renovation in 2013, the International Market Place reopened on August 25, 2016. Revenues from the International Market Place directly support The Queen’s Medical Center.

== Historical roots ==
King William Charles Lunalilo, the first elected king in Hawaiian history, at one time owned the land where the International Market Place is located, using it as grounds for his residence. Known as ke ali’i lokomaikaʻi, or "the kind king", Lunalilo later gifted the land to Queen Emma, wife of King Kamehameha IV. Queen Emma was well known for her tireless humanitarian efforts, and saw The Queen’s Hospital being named in her honor as part of her charitable legacy.

Donn Beach moved to Honolulu in the mid-1950s before Hawaii had become a state and leased a piece of land from the Queen Emma Foundation. He founded The International Marketplace in 1956, eventually opening a new Don the Beachcomber's restaurant there. A book co-authored by Beach's ex-wife claims the marketplace was the brainchild of Beach and "Pete" Wimberly, "conceived on wrapping paper in the back of the old Moana Cottages." He commissioned celebrated carver Edward “Mick” Brownlee to create much of the original woodwork for the Market Place.

A large banyan tree saw Beach's installation of an office tree house where he could be seen surveying the activity in the Market Place below. Other buildings included the Dagger Bar, and several representations of small villages meant to symbolize Korea, China, Japan, and the South Seas. During the 1960s, the Market Place also included the Hawaiian Hālau, Japanese Tea House and Esplanade buildings. Generations of notable musicians performed at the Market Place’s nightclubs. This included Martin Denny, the bandleader behind the fusion of new wave jazz and jungle noises called exotica. Singer Don Ho later had a regular gig at the International Market Place before he hit it big at places like Duke Kahanamoku's Nightclub. At its height the International Market Place encompassed 50 shops, night clubs, and restaurants, three of which were owned by Beach himself, including The Colonel's Plantation and Beef Steak and Coffee House.

Beach was honored with a House Resolution Tourism Award in 1957. He died in Hawaii in 1989. The International Market Place had experienced almost complete turnover since its inception, and all of its buildings were finally bulldozed in 2013 after they had fallen into great disrepair. Preservationists ensured that the main banyan tree remained for the completely new International Market Place's grand reopening in 2016. A commemorative plaque installed on the new "Don's Treehouse" reads in part: "The opening of Dagger Bar and the Bazaar Buildings in 1956 marked the establishment of Waikiki Village. Donn Beach...lived and worked in this treehouse...it was also the broadcasting home of radio personalities like J. Akuhead Pupule, who shared Hawaiian music with the world."

== Tenants ==
The International Market Place's tenants include approximately 90 stores and 10 restaurants. Its former anchor tenant was a three-level, 80,000-square-foot Saks Fifth Avenue, the department store’s only full-line Hawai‘i location. The department store closed during the summer of 2022, which was replaced with a Target that opened in October 2024.

== Ownership ==
International Market Place is situated on six acres of land, owned by the Queen Emma Land Company. The center itself is owned by Taubman and CoastWood Capital Group through a long-term land lease with the Queen Emma Land Company. Taubman leases and manages the project.

== Gallery ==
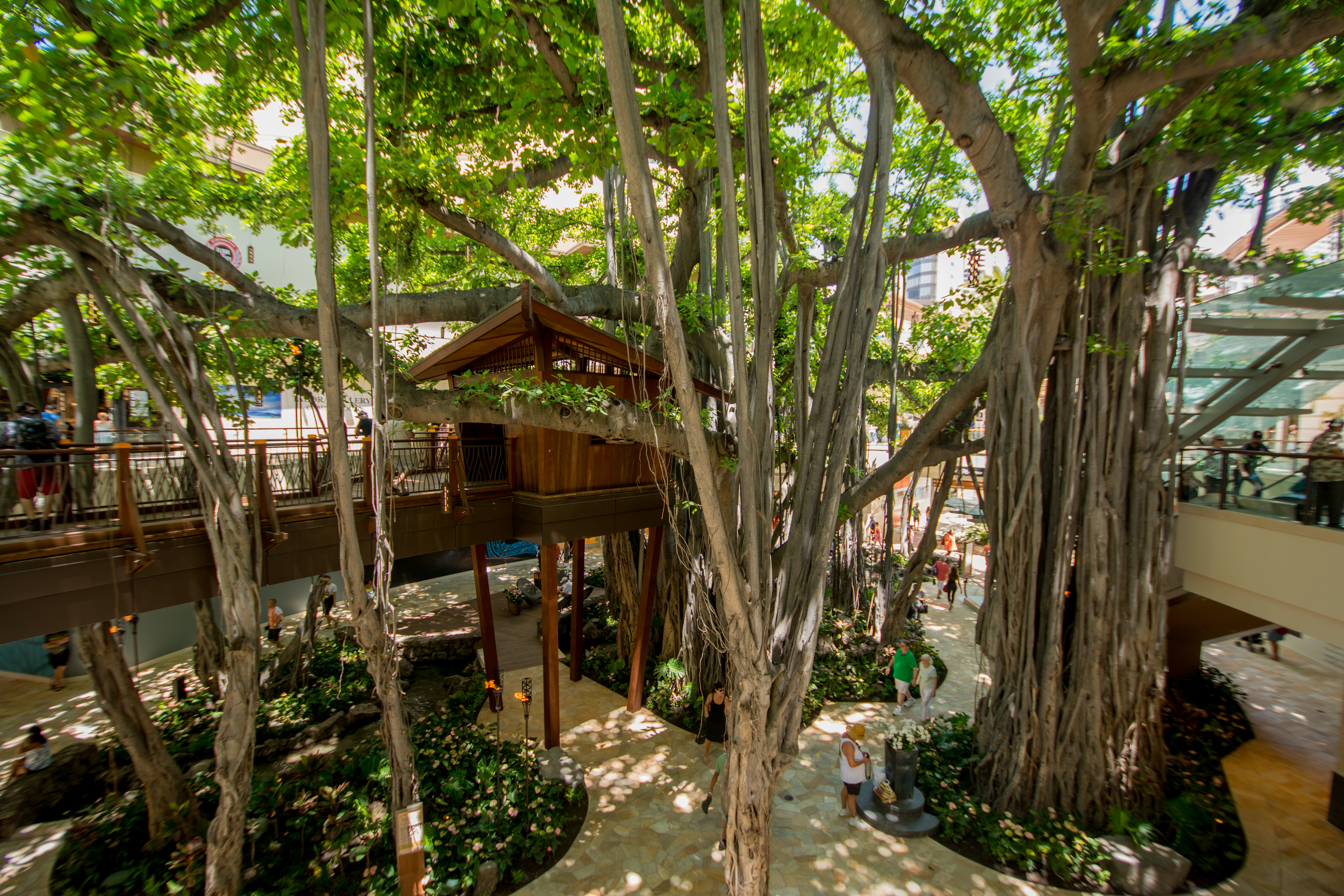

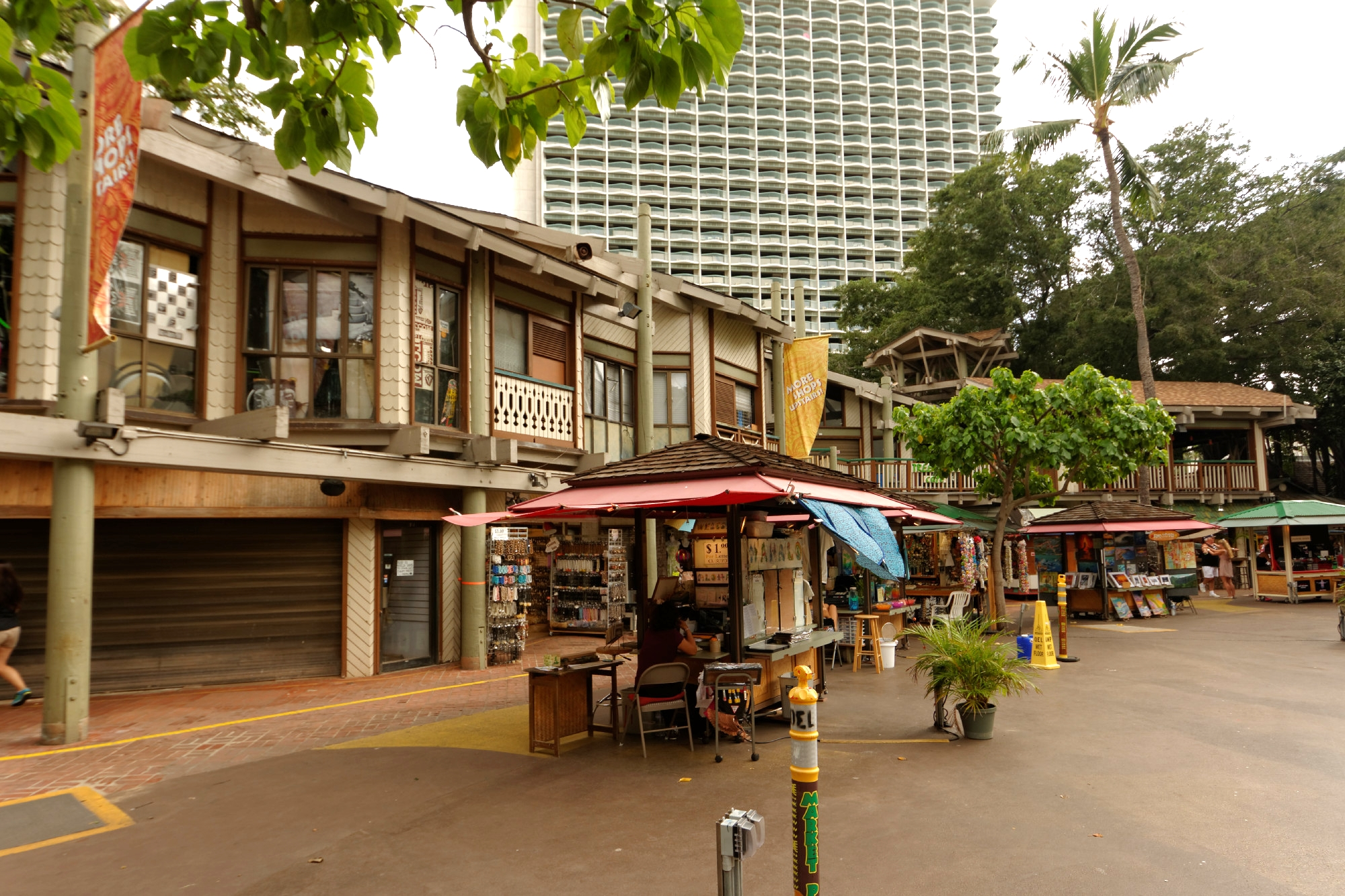

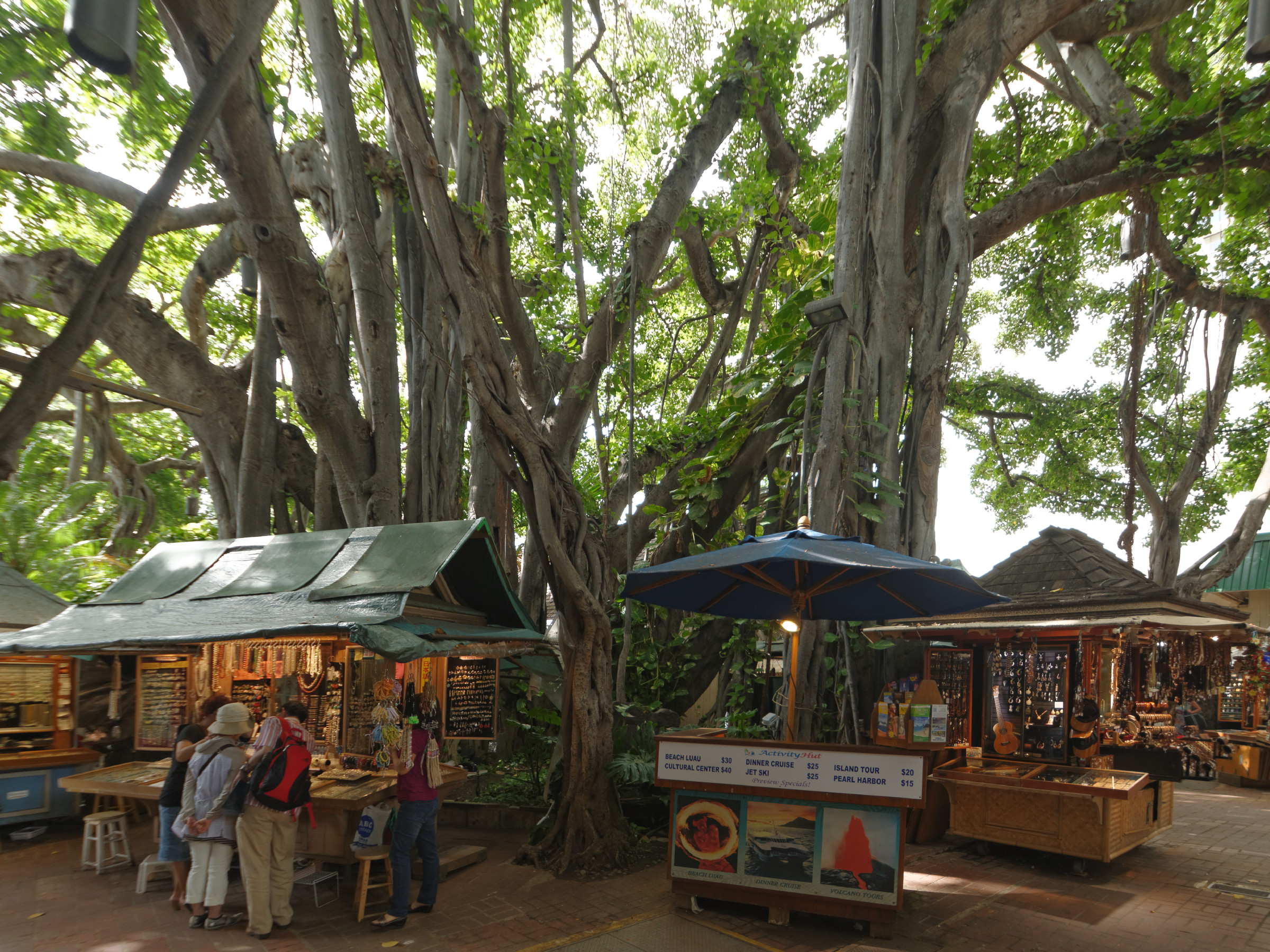

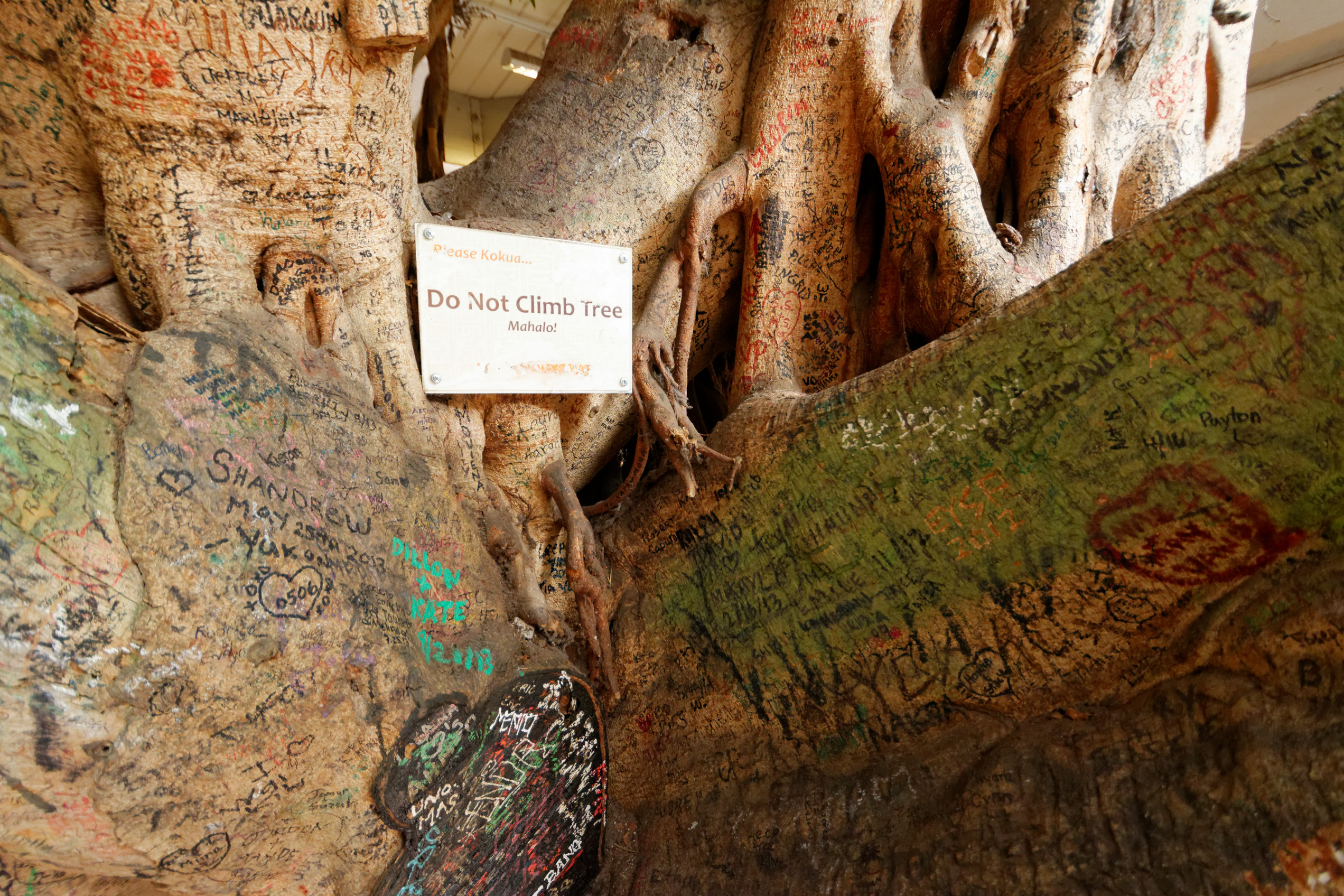

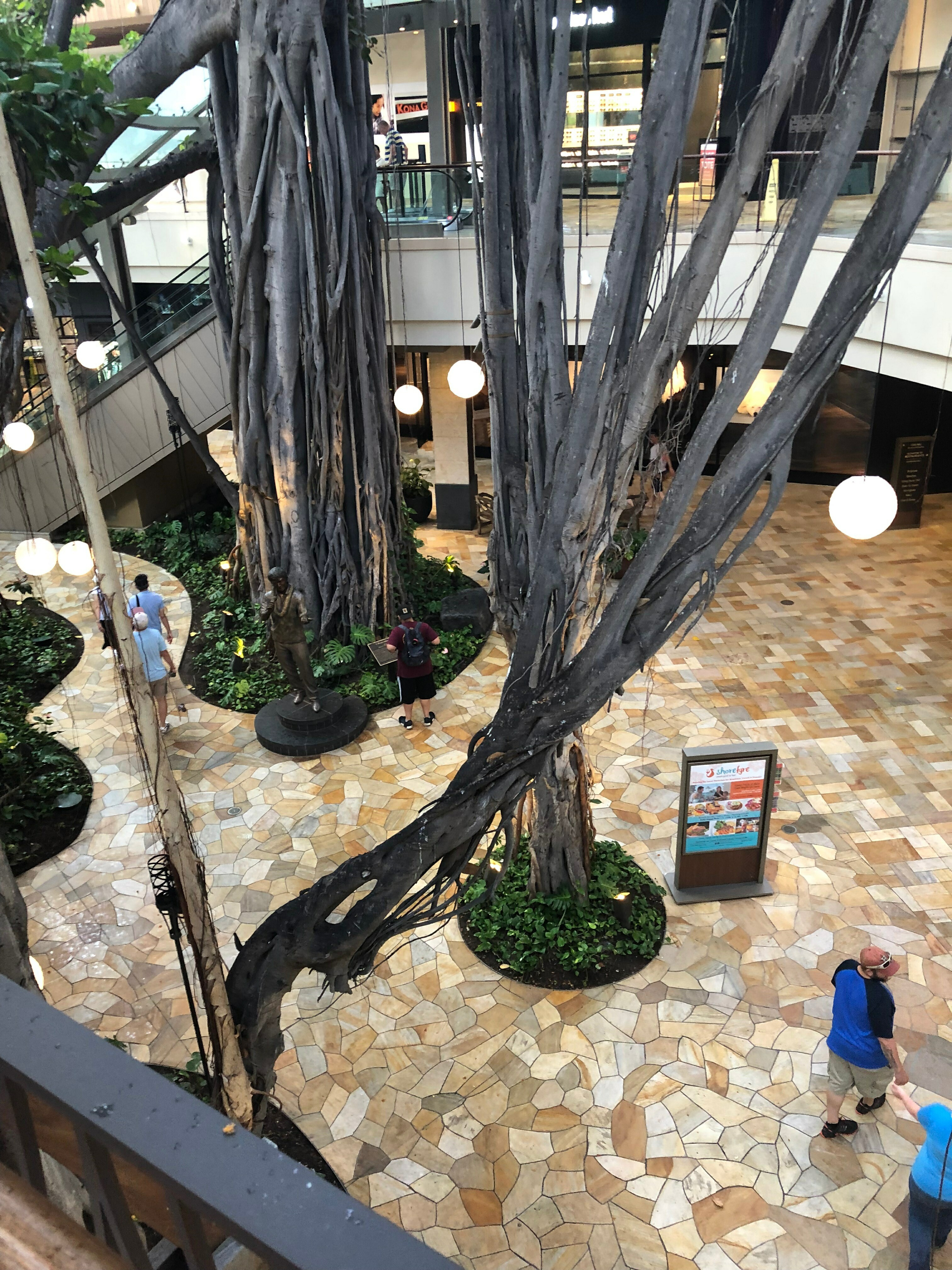

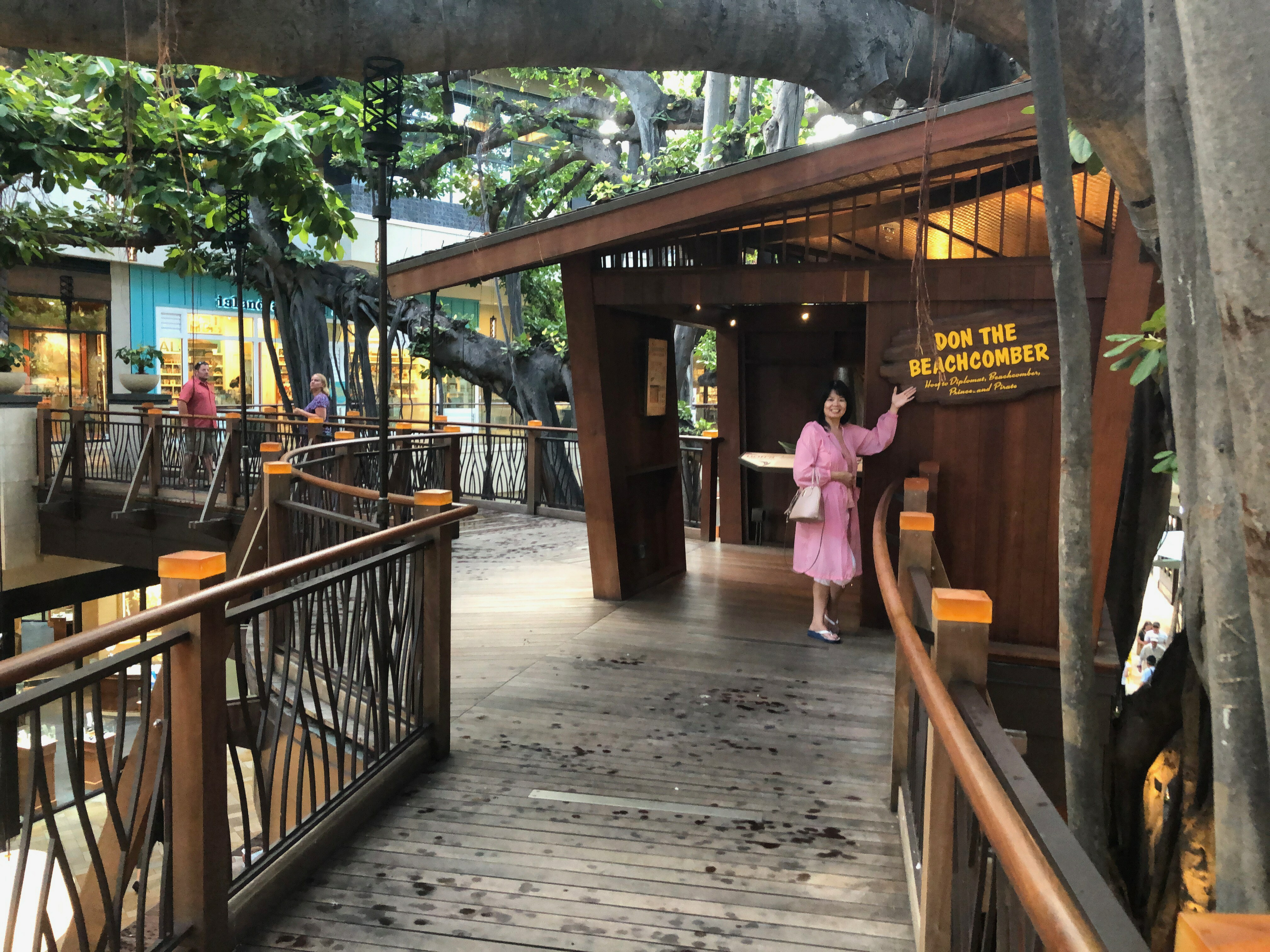

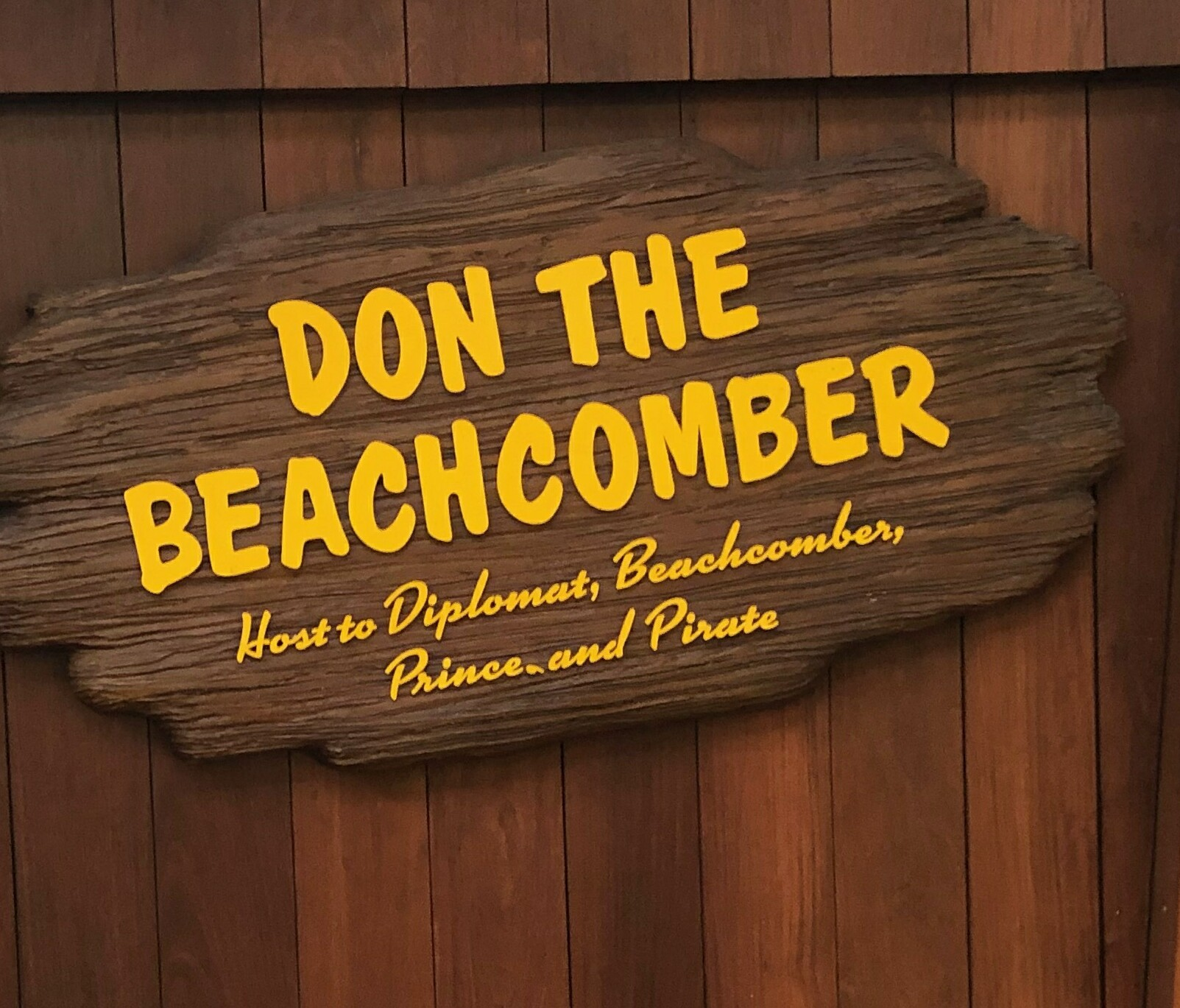

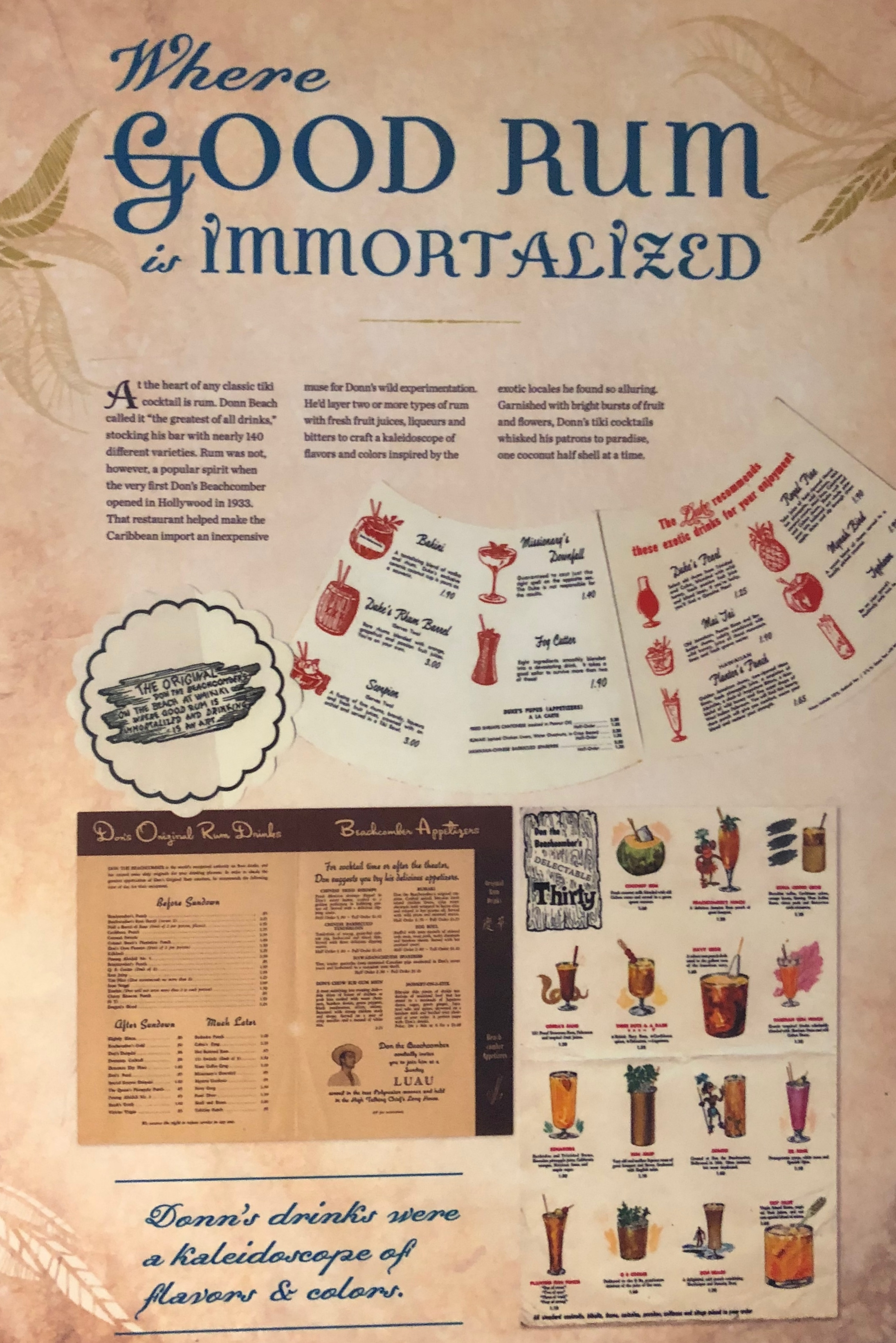
