= Royal Hawaiian Center =

Outdoor shopping center in Waikiki, Oahu

- Location: Waikiki, Oahu, Hawaii
- Address: 2201 Kalakaua Ave, Honolulu, HI 96815
- Opened: 1979; 40+ years ago
- Developer: Kamehameha Schools
- Manager: The Festival Companies
- Owner: The Festival Companies
- Num. of stores: 100
- Floor area: 310,000 square feet
- Floors: 3 (Note: Features 3 floors, though the A & B buildings of the center have a fourth floor.)
- Parking: 600+
- Website: royalhawaiiancenter.com

Royal Hawaiian Center is an outdoor shopping center in the shopping district of Kalakaua Avenue in Waikiki, Oahu, in the US state of Hawaii. As of 2017, Royal Hawaiian Center had the fifth highest sales per square foot in the US.

Restaurants at the Royal Hawaiian Center include The Cheesecake Factory, P.F. Chang's China Bistro, Tim Ho Wan and Wolfgang's Steakhouse.

== History ==
The shopping center originally opened in 1979 as the Royal Hawaiian Shopping Center, as part of the Royal Hawaiian Hotel complex with about 100 shops and restaurants and a food court. It was constructed as three separate buildings adjacent to each other with sky walks connecting the upper floors. The center, owned by Kamehameha Schools at the time, completed a $100 million renovation in 2007 to include more retailers and restaurants. The center was sold to RHC Property Holding LLC in 2013.

The Apple Store at the Royal Hawaiian Center was permanently closed on January 20, 2024.

== See also ==
- List of largest shopping malls in the world
- List of largest shopping malls in the United States
- Ala Moana Center
- International Market Place
