= Bill Mullahey =

Pan Am airline executive and Pacific tourism promoter

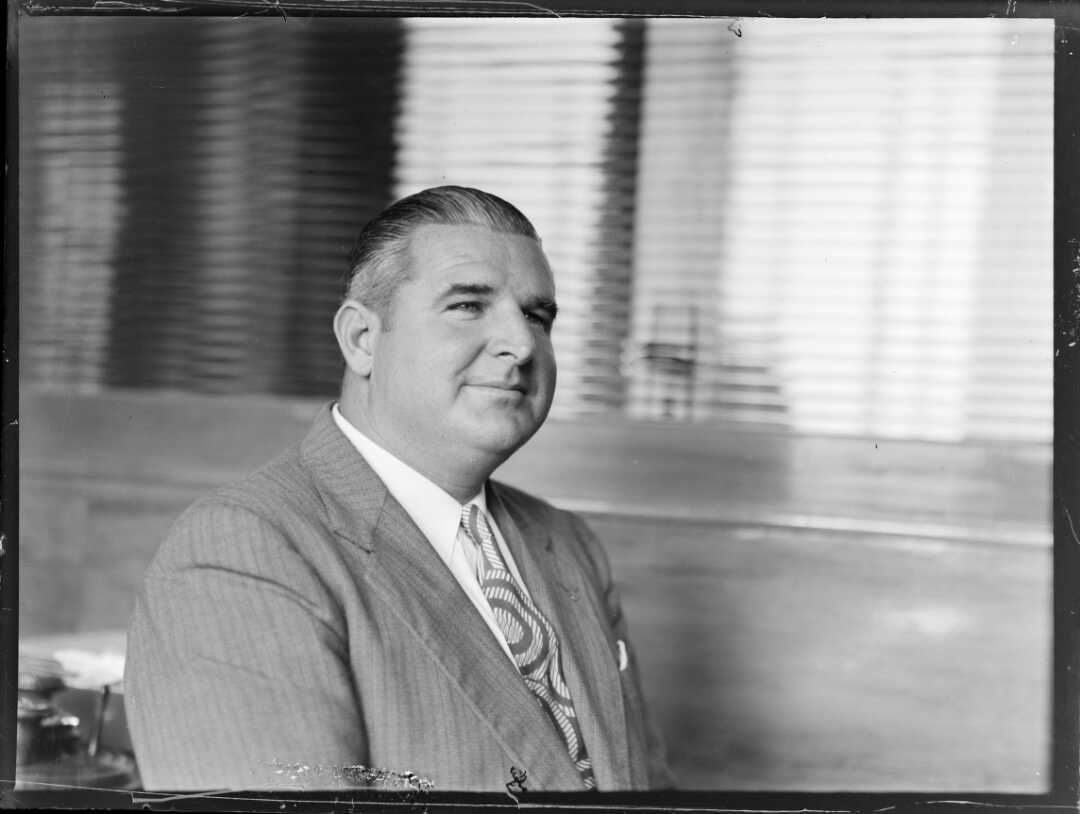
- Born: William Justin Mullahey; 1909; San Francisco, California, U.S.
- Died: April 15, 1981 (aged 71); Carmel, California, U.S.
- Occupation: Airline Executive
- Spouses: Mary M. Mason (m. 1935; died 1955) Margaret D. White (née Dalzell) (m. 1956)

William Justin Mullahey (1909 – April 15, 1981) was an American airline executive who was a long-time employee of Pan American Airways, helping the company expand its presence across the Pacific. He also played a large role in developing tourism throughout the Pacific Islands, including leading the development of the Pacific Asia Travel Association.

== Early life ==
Mullahey was born in 1909 in San Francisco, but his father, Thomas F. Mullahey, who worked for the Commercial Pacific Cable Company, was transferred to Honolulu in 1910. As a child, he was an active swimmer and surfer, and in 1928, Mullahey and two friends made local news for paddling on surfboards from Waimānalo to Mānana island, a distance of about 1 mile (1.6 km).

He attended the Saint Louis School in Honolulu before going to college at Columbia University in New York. At Columbia, he studied engineering and was on the swim and crew teams. It took him five years to earn his degree, in part because he often returned to Hawaiʻi to avoid New York winters. During summers, he stayed with family on Long Island and worked as a lifeguard at Jones Beach. As a lieutenant in the Jones Beach Lifeguard Corps, Mullahey promoted the use of surfboards in water rescues.

When he returned to Hawaiʻi in 1934, Mullahey was hired by the Outrigger Canoe Club to establish the Waikīkī Beach Patrol based on the lifeguard patrol at Jones Beach.

== Pan American Airways ==
In 1935, Mullahey returned to the Pacific, joining Pan Am's first S.S. North Haven expedition to construct provisioning ports for flying boats providing service across the Pacific. Mullahey served as an underwater demolitions expert, free diving at Wake and Midway atolls to place dynamite charges needed to clear coral to create landing channels in the lagoons. In total some 5 short tons (4.5 metric tons) of dynamite were used to demolish some 400 coral heads over the course of three months in the Wake Atoll lagoon. He spent over a year working at Wake and Midway, before becoming an airport clerk in Manila, Philippines. He next worked as an airport manager at Macao and Hong Kong, before becoming the Pan Am airport manager for Guam in 1937. He later served as airport manager in Manila, Honolulu, and Canton.

When World War II broke out, Mullahey was airport manager in Auckland, New Zealand, from where he helped evacuate Pan Am staff from across the Pacific. He also helped the crew of the Pacific Clipper map out its westward flight from Auckland to New York in December 1941. In 1942, Mullahey participated in the Naval Air Transport Service South Pacific Survey Flight, which used a Pan AM PBM-3 Mariner to scout a route for regular service between San Francisco and Brisbane, Australia. Throughout the war, Mullahey served as the liaison between Pan Am and the U.S. Navy, reporting to Admiral Chester W. Nimitz.

In 1954, Mullahey was named director of South and Central Pacific Operations for Pan Am, based in Hawaiʻi. He remained with Pan Am, building the airline's operations throughout the Pacific, until his retirement in 1972. During his time with Pan Am, Mullahey oversaw development of the Boeing 314 Clipper base at Cavite Naval Yard in the Philippines, opened a base at Suva, Fiji, arranged for the first Pan Am flights to Macao and Hong Kong, and oversaw aerial and landing surveys in Fiji, Lau, and New Caledonia, as well as opened new routes to other Pacific destinations.

== Tourism promotion ==
In 1951, Mullahey set about organizing the first Pacific-area travel conference with the aim of promoting tourism to the Asia–Pacific region, which had been heavily affected by World War II. During the conference, held January 10–15, 1952, in Waikīkī, Hawaiʻi, 32 companies established the Pacific Interim Travel Association (PITA), with the goal of encouraging and assisting travel throughout the Pacific area. PITA changed its name to the Pacific Area Travel Association (PATA) the following year. In 1986, PATA became the Pacific Asia Travel Association.

In 1953, he joined Island Holidays Ltd. as a personal investor in the Coco Palms Resort.

Mullahey was credited with establishing Hawaiʻi as a launching point for travel to the other island nations of the Pacific. Due to his work building Pan Am and tourism throughout the region, Mullahey was nicknamed "Mr. Pacific".

Mullahey received several awards and honors for his work promoting tourism to Hawaiʻi and the Pacific. In 1979, he was inducted into the Chamber of Commerce of Hawaiʻi's "Order of the Splintered Paddle". In 2007, the University of Hawaiʻi at Mānoa School of Travel Industry Management and the Hawaii Hospitality Hall of Fame posthumously honored Mullahey for his legacy. He is also included in the PATA Gallery of Legends at Daniel K. Inouye International Airport in Honolulu.

== Personal life ==
Mullahey married twice, first in 1935 to Mary H. Mason (1913–1955) of Hilo, Hawaiʻi, with whom he had a son, Michael; then, in 1956, to Margaret White née Dalzell (1912–1999). He died on April 15, 1981, in Carmel, California, and his ashes were spread in the Pacific near Hawaiʻi.
