= The Waterfront Beach Resort =

Hotel in Huntington Beach, United States

Coordinates: 33°39′12″N 117°59′40″W

The Waterfront Beach Resort, a Hilton Hotel
- Interactive map of the The Waterfront Beach Resort, a Hilton Hotel area

General information
- Location: 21100 Pacific Coast Highway, Huntington Beach, CA, 92648
- Opening: July 1990
- Operator: Hilton Hotels

Technical details
- Floor count: 12 Huntington Tower, 9 Twin Dolphin Tower

Design and construction
- Architects: Wimberly, Allison, Tong & Goo of Newport Beach

Other information
- Number of rooms: 437
- Number of suites: 156
- Number of restaurants: Henry's Coastal Cuisine, Cabo Wabo Beach Club, Surf Hero Marketplace, Offshore 9 Rooftop Lounge.
- Parking: Valet Parking Only

Website
- https://www.waterfrontresort.com/

The Waterfront Beach Resort is a 437-room hotel and resort located in Huntington Beach, California. The hotel is owned by Robert Mayer Corp., an Irvine-based family-operated company.

== History ==
The Hilton Waterfront Beach Resort opened in July 1990, constructed at a cost of $55 million.

In February 2016, the owner announced a $140 million expansion and renovation project to add a nine-story suite-only tower, containing 151 suites, 14,000 square feet of meeting space, a restaurant, a spa, and other amenities. The new Twin Dolphin Tower was opened in 2017. The project was completed by the end of 2019 after the opening of a 8,000-square-foot spa. At the conclusion of renovations, the hotel was renamed The Waterfront Beach Resort, a Hilton Hotel.
