= Pacific Asia Travel Association =

Travel and tourism trade organization

- Abbreviation: PATA
- Founded: 1951; 75 years ago
- Founder: Lorrin P. Thurston; Bill Mullahey
- Founded at: Honolulu, Hawaiʻi, US
- Type: trade association
- Legal status: not for profit
- Purpose: tourism promotion
- Headquarters: Bangkok, Thailand
- Location: Beijing, China
- Region served: Asia–Pacific
- Chief Executive Officer: Noor Ahmad Hamid
- Chief Financial Officer: Pairoj Kiatthunsamai
- Website: www.pata.org
- Formerly called: Pacific Interim Travel Association (1952–1953); Pacific Area Travel Association (1953–1986)

The Pacific Asia Travel Association (PATA) is a membership association working to promote the responsible development of travel and tourism in the Asia Pacific region. The Association organises innovative events, publishes research, and provides networking opportunities, brand exposure and advocacy, and sustainability consultation.

PATA’s current vision and mission statements have been ratified during the 74th Annual General Meeting on April 22, 2025. The vision statement is ‘A meaningful Pacific Asia tourism economy’ and the mission statement is ‘To share knowledge, enable networking, and protect tourism economy assets by fostering innovation, collaboration and adaptability.’

== History ==
The Pacific Asia Travel Association (PATA) was founded in 1951 and formally established in January 1952, following the efforts by Pan Am Regional Manager Bill Mullahey to organise a Pacific-area travel conference to promote tourism in a region still recovering from World War II. Supported by Lorrin P. Thurstin, publisher of the Honolulu Advertiser, the inaugural meeting convened in Waikīkī, Hawaiʻi, with 91 delegates from 13 countries. This gathering led to the formation of the Pacific Interim Travel Association (PITA), which was incorporated two months later with the mission to develop tourism throughout the Pacific area. PITA was formed with 25 active and 12 allied members. Represented were tourism and transportation companies from Alaska, Australia, Canada, Fiji, Guam, Hawaii, Japan, New Zealand, the Philippine Islands, Samoa, Tahiti, and the United States.

In 1953, PITA was renamed the Pacific Area Travel Association and relocated its headquarters to San Francisco under Executive Director Sam Mercer. Membership grew to include governments, carriers, hotels, travel agents, and other industry players. By the late 1950s, the association had 325 members and launched its first research initiatives and advertising campaigns.

The 1960s saw significant milestones, including the establishment of the first PATA chapters in New Zealand and Hong Kong, as well as the founding of the School of Tourism Industry Management (TIM) at the University of Hawaiʻi. In 1962, the Checchi Report, a comprehensive study on Pacific tourism commissioned by PATA, became a critical resource for member destinations.

In the 1970s, PATA expanded its focus to education, training, and heritage conservation through the establishment of the “Development Authority”, an advisory body composed of experts from diverse backgrounds and specialisations, whose purpose would be to carry out the association's intentions towards heritage conservation, education and training, and environmental enhancement. Pioneering initiatives included task force missions, such as the successful development plans for Chiang Mai, Thailand, as requested by Lieutenant General Chalermchai Charuvastr, Director General of the Tourist Organisation of Thailand (currently TAT).

In 1978, the inaugural PATA Travel Mart was launched in Manila. The event was the brainchild of then-PATA Staff Vice President Gerald Picolla, who saw the potential of such marts to generate huge volumes of business for participating member organisations at a fraction of the cost of doing business on the road.

The association adopted the name Pacific Asia Travel Association in 1986, reflecting Asia’s growing prominence. That decade also saw the creation of the PATA Foundation under George Howling, focusing on cultural and environmental preservation by administering project funding.

PATA advocated sustainable tourism in the 1990s with its "Code for Environmentally Responsible Tourism" and launched initiatives like the Green Leaf Program. In 1998, the organisation moved its headquarters to Bangkok, aligning more closely with its core membership base.

In the 2000s, PATA responded to global crises with initiatives such as Project Phoenix, which revitalised tourism following the September 11 attacks, and relief efforts after the 2004 Indian Ocean tsunami. Sustainability remained central, with the association adopting a mission to promote responsible tourism development.

== Organisational structure ==
The PATA Executive Board serves as the governing body of PATA, guided by the PATA Board. The organisation's staff operates under the leadership of the CEO.

== Events ==
Each year, PATA organises PATA Travel Mart and the PATA Annual Summit, which are flagship events held in rotation across member destinations. The Association also organises thematic events that focus on key topics in the travel and tourism industry.

The Association holds the PATA Gold Awards presentation annually to celebrate the achievements of organisations and individuals for their contributions to responsible and innovative tourism.

== Membership and Chapters ==
PATA serves as a collaborative platform that brings together organisations from both the public and private sectors. The association offers six categories of Membership: Partners, Government, Aviation, Hospitality, Industry and Education.

PATA Chapters and Student Chapters have been established throughout the world to assist in the fulfilment of the objectives of the Association.

== PATA Partners ==
PATA has signed Memoranda of Understanding (MOUs) and partnership agreements with educational institutions, travel technology providers, aviation data providers, accommodations, travel associations, and tourism organisations.

== Current Activities ==
=== Tourism and Travel Data: Publications and PATAmPOWER ===
PATA's flagship reports include the Asia Pacific Visitor Forecasts series (Executive Summary and Full editions), the Asia Pacific Destination Forecasts series, and the Annual Tourism Monitor series.

Complimenting these reports are the Quarterly Tourism Monitor (quarterly data release), and Issues & Trends (half-year analysis brief). In addition, PATA reviews, endorses, and co-brands externally produced studies in collaboration with partners and members..

Through long-term partnerships with national tourism offices, national statistical agencies, strategic partners and leading tourism research consultancies, PATA has access to tourism data such as international visitor arrivals, scheduled airline flights and seats, etc. Such data is made available for PATA members on the PATAmPOWER website.

=== Sustainability Initiatives ===
PATA supports its members and partners by enhancing capacity, amplifying voices, and delivering impactful projects to advance the United Nations Sustainable Development Goals (SDGs). Sustainability and social responsibility are central to its mission.

Since its inception, PATA has prioritised sustainable tourism, resilience, and crisis recovery. It has conducted over 40 task force visits, addressing challenges in established destinations and aiding emerging markets. Between 2021 and 2024, PATA trained over 1,900 tourism professionals in person and distributed over 6,000 course completion certificates for the TDR Core and TDR for SMEs online courses. Apart from these programmes, PATA has led destination transformation efforts with over 30 PATA Task Force initiatives, implemented in Macao, Bali, Nepal, Chiang Mai, and other destinations, providing tailored solutions and tangible positive impact.

PATA’s operations are guided by a Sustainability Policy, Climate Action Plan, and Carbon Neutral Events Guidelines, ensuring carbon neutrality across all activities since 2024. Its Sustainability Resource Centre (SRC) offers tools and training to support industry resilience and sustainability.

=== Human Capital Development ===
PATA has collaborated with Asia Pacific countries to deliver capacity-building training. These programmes often focus on building foundational knowledge in key areas such as tourism operations, MICE (Meetings, Incentives, Conferences, and Exhibitions), artificial intelligence, destination marketing, and more.

The workshops are aligned with PATA’s Strategy 2030, which aims to heighten tourism resilience and promote innovation in the Asia Pacific region.

=== Youth programmes and initiatives ===
PATA hosts Youth Symposia biannually to facilitate direct interaction and exchange of ideas between young professionals.

The PATA Internship Programme provides students and recent graduates from various backgrounds with practical experience in the travel and tourism industry. The programme offers skill development and cross-cultural engagement.

The PATA Face of the Future award is presented annually to young professionals. The candidates of this award are considered “Rising Stars”. The winners are selected based on demonstration of leadership qualities and dedication to sustainable tourism in the Asia Pacific region.

PATA Student Chapters are student-led groups that organise educational webinars, and networking events with industry professionals, and facilitate international collaborations. The chapters focus on encouraging students worldwide to be active in advocating for sustainable tourism practices, operating under the principle of ‘youth groups by students and for students’.

=== PATA Foundation ===
Since its establishment in 1984, the PATA Foundation has been supporting underprivileged communities in the region, with a focus on education and skill-building initiatives.
