= Haʻaheo Kaniu =

High chiefess of the Hawaiian Kingdom

- Died: c. 1843; Honolulu, Oahu
- Spouse: Kaikoʻokalani; Kuakini; Keaweamahi Kinimaka
- Issue: Kamanele

Haʻaheo Kaniu or Kaniuʻopiohaʻaheo (late 18th century – c. 1843) was a high chiefess (aliʻi) and member of the royal family of the Hawaiian Kingdom. She was also known as Lydia Haʻaheo Kaniu.

== Genealogy and family ==
Haʻaheo Kaniu was born in the late 18th-century. Sources on Haʻaheo Kaniu's genealogy are conflicting. An 1858 court case named Kalailua as the mother of Haʻaheo Kaniu and stated Kalailua was sister of ʻAikanaka (maternal grandfather of her future hānai son Kalākaua). An 1874 account in the Hawaiian language newspaper Ka Nuhou Hawaii listed her parent as Kalailua and Keaweaimoku and further specified that Kalailua was the child of Kaoo and Kamakaeheikuli.

Historian Abraham Fornander named High Chiefess ʻAkahi as her mother, who was a sister of Keawemauhili, Aliʻi Nui of Hilo and a rival of King Kamehameha I who conquered the Hawaiian Islands into a unified kingdom by 1810. This ʻAkahi was the foster mother of Keawemauhili's orphan daughter Kapiʻolani who became a later famous convert to Christianity. According to historian Sammy Amalu, she was the daughter of ʻAkahi-a-Kawalu (different from Fornander's ʻAkahi) and Keōua Kalanikupuapaʻīkalaninui Ahilapalapa, the father of Kamehameha I.

Haʻaheo Kaniu married to Kaikoʻokalani, the son of Kamehameha I and Peleuli. She also married Kuakini, who adopted the name John Adams and served as Governor of Hawaii Island. Kuakini was the younger brother of Kamehameha I's favorite wife Kaʻahumanu who served as Kuhina Nui (regent) for King Kamehameha II. With Kuakini, Haʻaheo Kaniu was the mother of Kamānele who was betrothed to Kamehameha III before her death at a young age. Both later remarried. Her final marriage was to Keaweamahi Kinimaka, a chief of lesser rank.

== Conversion to Christianity ==
American Protestant Christian missionaries arrived in Hawaii from New England in 1820. Three years later, around 1823, Haʻaheo Kaniu and her husband Kaiko became two of the earliest converts and accepted the new faith along with Queen Keōpūolani (the first royal to convert), Hoapili, Princess Nāhiʻenaʻena, Keʻeaumoku II, Kekauʻōnohi, Wahinepio, and Kaukuna Kahekili. These chiefs all attended classes set up by the American missionaries Charles Samuel Stewart and William Richards on the island of Maui. After her conversion to Christianity, she adopted the English name Lydia Haʻaheo Kaniu. Lydia was also the baptismal name of the future queen Liliʻuokalani.

== Adoption of Kalākaua ==
In 1836, Kapaʻakea and Keohokālole initially promised their unborn child Kalākaua in hānai to Kuini Liliha, a high-ranking chiefess and the widow of High Chief Boki who were both former governors of Oahu. The Hawaiian custom of hānai is an informal form of adoption between extended families. However, on the night of his birth at 2:00 a.m. on November 16, 1836, Haʻaheo Kaniu stood outside the grass hut compound on the outskirt of Honolulu where Keohokālole was in labor. She took the newborn from his birthplace to her home at Honuakaha, which was one of the residences of King Kamehameha III. Afterward, Kuhina Nui Elizabeth Kīnaʻu, who disliked Liliha, deliberated and ordered his parents to give him to Haʻaheo Kaniu and her husband Kinimaka instead.

Haʻaheo Kaniu brought Kalākaua with her when the royal court and King Kamehameha III returned to Lāhainā, which was the kingdom's capital at the time. At the age of four, Kalākaua was enrolled with his birth siblings at Honolulu's Chiefs' Children's School and formally proclaimed by the king as eligible for the throne of the Hawaiian Kingdom.

According to the testimony of Nauhele (a member of her family), Haʻaheo Kaniu died in 1843, in Honolulu. In a verbal will witnessed by Oahu Governor Kekūanaōʻa, she bequeathed all her properties in Honolulu and Lahaina and on the islands of Hawaii and Molokai to her hānai son with her widower Kinimaka holding onto the properties until Kalākaua came of age. After her death, Kinimaka was given guardianship over Kalākaua. Kinimaka would later marry Pai, a subordinate Tahitian chiefess, who treated Kalākaua as her own until the birth of her own son. Eventually, Kalākaua returned to live with his birth parents. Kinimaka named his daughter Haʻaheo Kaniu Kinimaka after her. Kinimaka died in 1857. In 1858, Kalākaua successfully sued the heirs of Kinimaka for the rights to Haʻaheo Kaniu's landholding in a case presided by Supreme Court justice George Morison Robertson.

== Bibliography ==
- Allen, Helena G. (1982). The Betrayal of Liliuokalani: Last Queen of Hawaii, 1838–1917. Glendale, CA: A. H. Clark Company. ISBN 978-0-87062-144-4. OCLC 9576325. Archived from the original on January 13, 2018.
- Allen, Helena G. (1995). Kalakaua: Renaissance King. Honolulu: Mutual Publishing. ISBN 978-1-56647-059-9. OCLC 35083815. Archived from the original on December 21, 2019.
- Boelen, Jacobus; Broeze, Frank (1988). A Merchant's Perspective: Captain Jacobus Boelen's Narrative of His Visit to Hawaiʻi in 1828. Honolulu: Hawaiian Historical Society. ISBN 978-0-945048-00-8. OCLC 18364753.
- Biographical Sketch of His Majesty King Kalakaua. Honolulu: P. C. Advertiser Steam Printing Office. 1884. pp. 72–74. OCLC 12787107. Archived from the original on October 19, 2018.
- Cooke, Amos Starr; Cooke, Juliette Montague (1937). Richards, Mary Atherton (ed.). The Chiefs' Children School: A Record Compiled from the Diary and Letters of Amos Starr Cooke and Juliette Montague Cooke, by Their Granddaughter Mary Atherton Richards. Honolulu: Honolulu Star-Bulletin. OCLC 1972890. Archived from the original on November 28, 2016.
- Dibble, Sheldon (1843). History of the Sandwich Islands. Lahainaluna: Press of the Mission Seminary. OCLC 2145112.
- Fornander, Abraham (1880). Stokes, John F. G. (ed.). An Account of the Polynesian Race: Its Origins and Migrations, and the Ancient History of the Hawaiian People to the Times of Kamehameha I. Vol. 2. London: Trubner & Company. OCLC 4823096. Archived from the original on June 29, 2016.
- Kamakau, Samuel (1992) [1961]. Ruling Chiefs of Hawaii (Revised ed.). Honolulu: Kamehameha Schools Press. ISBN 0-87336-014-1. OCLC 25008795. Archived from the original on May 23, 2006.
- McKinzie, Edith Kawelohea (1986). Stagner, Ishmael W. (ed.). Hawaiian Genealogies: Extracted from Hawaiian Language Newspapers. Vol. 2. Honolulu: University of Hawaii Press. ISBN 978-0-939154-37-1. OCLC 12555087. Archived from the original on June 13, 2020.
- Mookini, Esther T. (1998). "Keopuolani: Sacred Wife, Queen Mother, 1778–1823" (PDF). The Hawaiian Journal of History. 32. Honolulu: Hawaiian Historical Society: 1–24. hdl:10524/569. OCLC 60626541.
- Pratt, Elizabeth Kekaaniauokalani Kalaninuiohilaukapu (1920). History of Keoua Kalanikupuapa-i-nui: Father of Hawaii Kings, and His Descendants, with Notes on Kamehameha I, First King of All Hawaii. Honolulu: Honolulu Star-Bulletin. OCLC 154181545. Archived from the original on May 3, 2016.
- Stewart, Charles Samuel (1828). Journal of a Residence in the Sandwich Islands: During the Years 1823, 1824, and 1825. New York: John P. Haven. OCLC 1179424.
- Van Dyke, Jon M. (2008). Who Owns the Crown Lands of Hawai'i?. Honolulu, HI: University of Hawaii Press. ISBN 978-0-8248-3210-0. Archived from the original on November 11, 2016 – via Project MUSE.
