= List of burials at the Royal Mausoleum (Mauna ʻAla) =

The following is a list of burials at the Royal Mausoleum, in Nuʻuanu Valley (within Honolulu, Hawaii). Many took royal titles after their predecessors; the list below gives birth name as well if different.

== Kamehameha Tomb ==
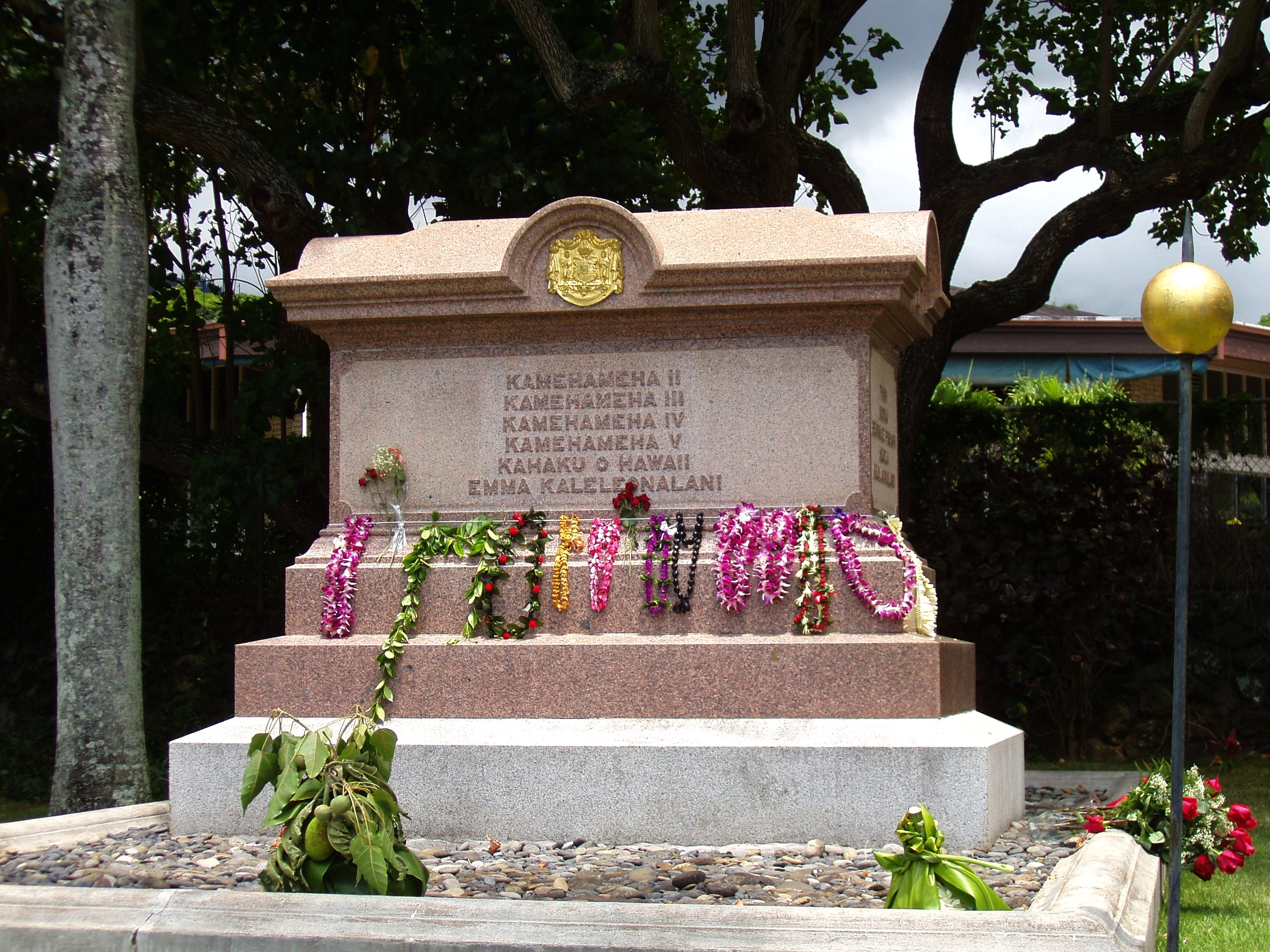
The Kamehameha Dynasty Tomb

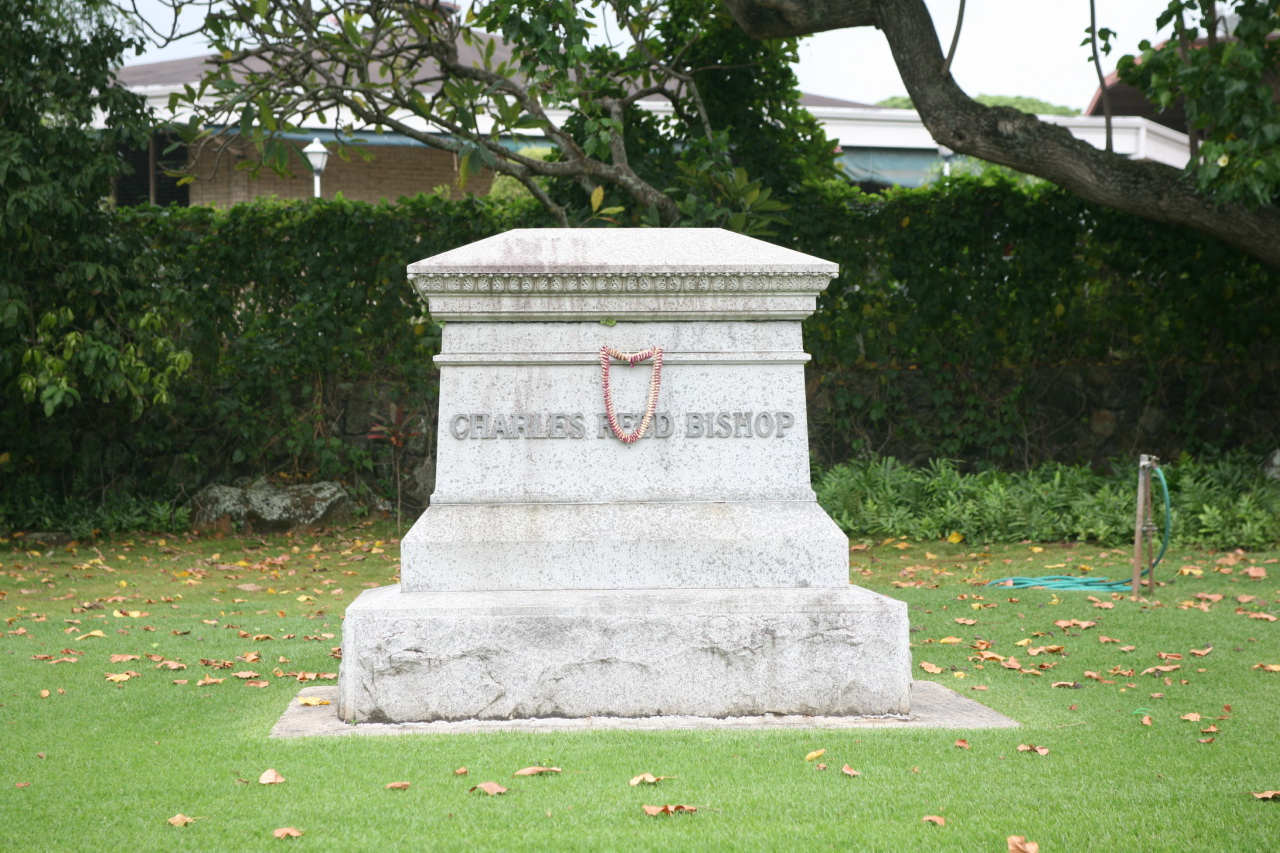
Monument to Charles Reed Bishop, husband of Princess Bernice Pauahi Bishop. Although Bishop is actually buried in the Kamehameha Tomb.

- Queen Kaʻahumanu (c. 1768–1832)
- King Kamehameha II, Liholiho (1797–1824)
- Queen Kamāmalu, Victoria Kamāmalu (1802–1824)
- King Kamehameha III, Kauikeaouli (1813–1854)
- Queen Kalama (1817–1870)
- Prince Keaweaweʻulaokalani I (January 1832–February 1832)
- Prince Keaweaweʻulaokalani II (1839?)
- Queen Kīnaʻu Kaʻahumanu II, Elizabeth Kīnaʻu (1805–1839)
- King Kamehameha IV, Alexander Liholiho (1834–1863)
- Queen Emma, Emma Kaleleonālani Rooke (1836–1885)
- Prince Albert Kamehameha, Albert Edward Kauikeaouli (1858–1862)
- King Kamehameha V, Lot Kapuāiwa (1830–1872)
- Princess Victoria Kamāmalu Kaʻahumanu IV (1838–1866)
- Prince Moses Kekūāiwa (1829–1848)
- Prince David Kamehameha (1828–1835)
- High Chief William Pitt Leleiohoku I (1821–1848)
- Princess Ruth Keʻelikōlani (1826–1883)
- Prince John William Pitt Kīnaʻu (1842–1859)
- Prince Keolaokalani Davis Bishop (1862–1863)
- High Chief Pākī, Abner Kuhoʻoheiheipahu Pākī (1808–1855)
- High Chiefess Kōnia, Laura Kōnia (1808–1857)
- High Chiefess Bernice Pauahi Bishop (1831–1884)
- Charles Reed Bishop (1822–1915)

== Kalākaua Crypt ==
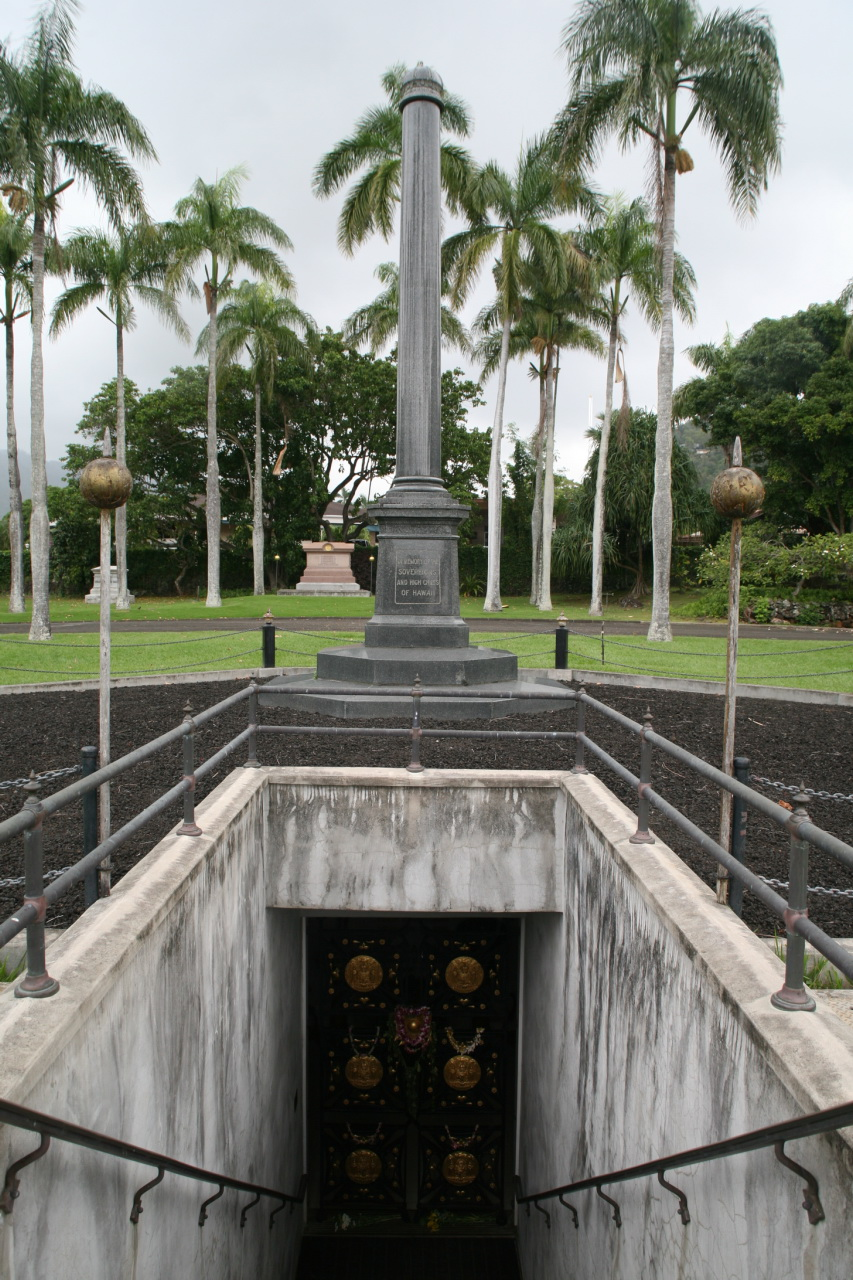
Entrance to the Kalākaua Crypt.

- King Kalākaua (1836–1891)
- Queen Kapiʻolani (1834–1899)
- Queen Liliʻuokalani (1838–1917)
- Prince Consort John Owen Dominis (1832–1891)
- High Chief Caesar Kaluaiku Kapaʻakea (1815–1866)
- High Chiefess Analea Keohokālole (1816–1869)
- Princess Miriam Likelike (1851–1887)
- Archibald Scott Cleghorn (1835–1910)
- Princess Victoria Kaiʻulani (1875–1899)
- Prince William Pitt Leleiohoku II (1854–1877)
- Kaʻiminaʻauao (1845–1848)
- Princess Virginia Poʻomaikelani (1839–1895)
- Princess Victoria Kūhiō Kekaulike (1843–1884)
- Prince David Kawānanakoa (1868–1908)
- Prince Jonah Kūhiō Kalanianaʻole (1871–1922)
- Prince Edward Abnel Keliʻiahonui (1869–1887)
- Princess Abigail Campbell Kawānanakoa (1882–1945)
- Prince David Kalākaua Kawānanakoa (1904–1953), last to be buried.
- A casket with remains of ancient chiefs, perhaps those of Naihe or Keawe-a-Heulu and Keliʻimaikaʻi

== Wyllie Tomb ==
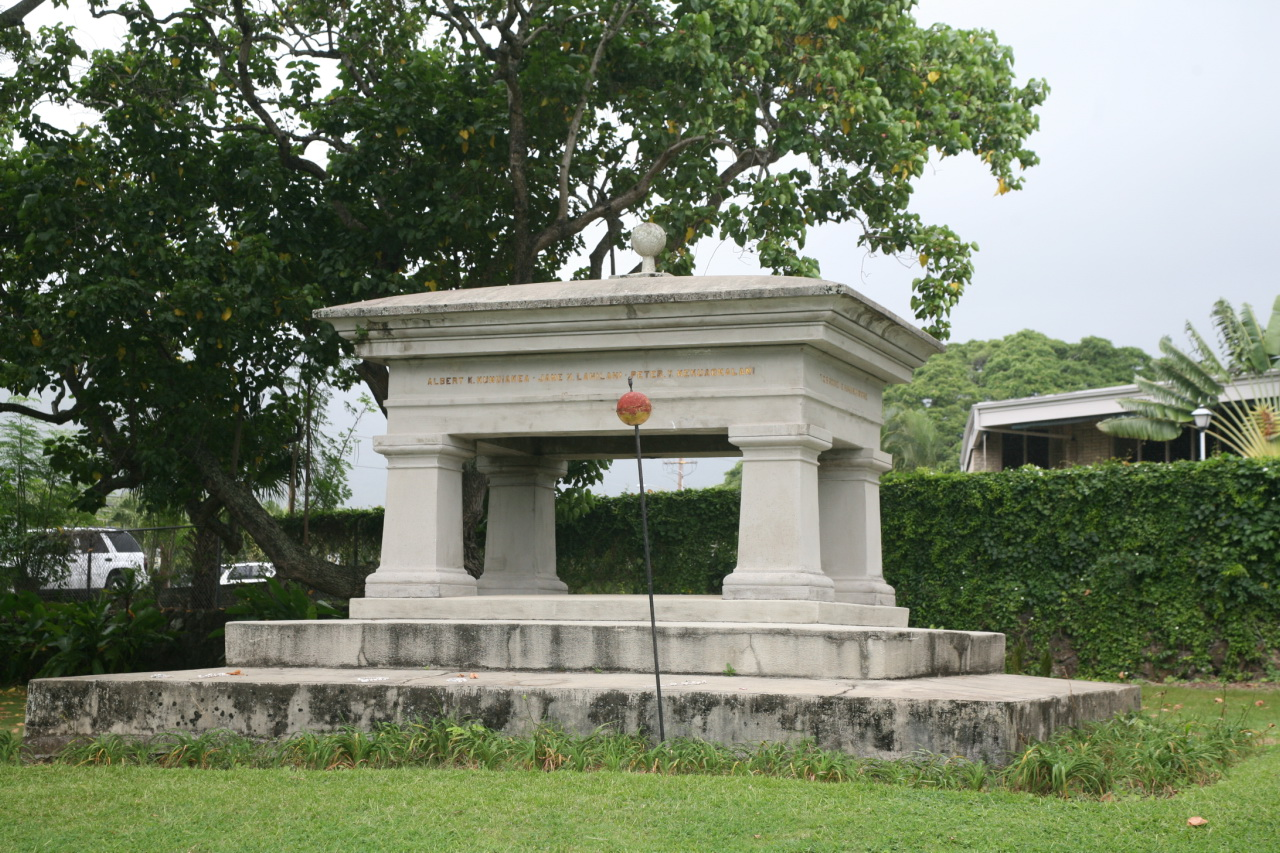
Wyllie Tomb.

- Robert Crichton Wyllie (1798–1865)
- Bennett Nāmākēhā (c. 1799–1860)
- Grace Kamaʻikuʻi (1808–1866), sometimes listed as Maikui (w) in older sources
- Thomas Charles Byde Rooke (1806–1858)
- Jane Lahilahi (1813–1862)
- Peter Kaʻeo (1836–1880)
- Albert Kūkaʻilimoku Kūnuiākea (1853–1903)
- Fanny Kekelaokalani (1806–1880)
- Keoni Ana (1810–1857)

== John Young Tomb ==
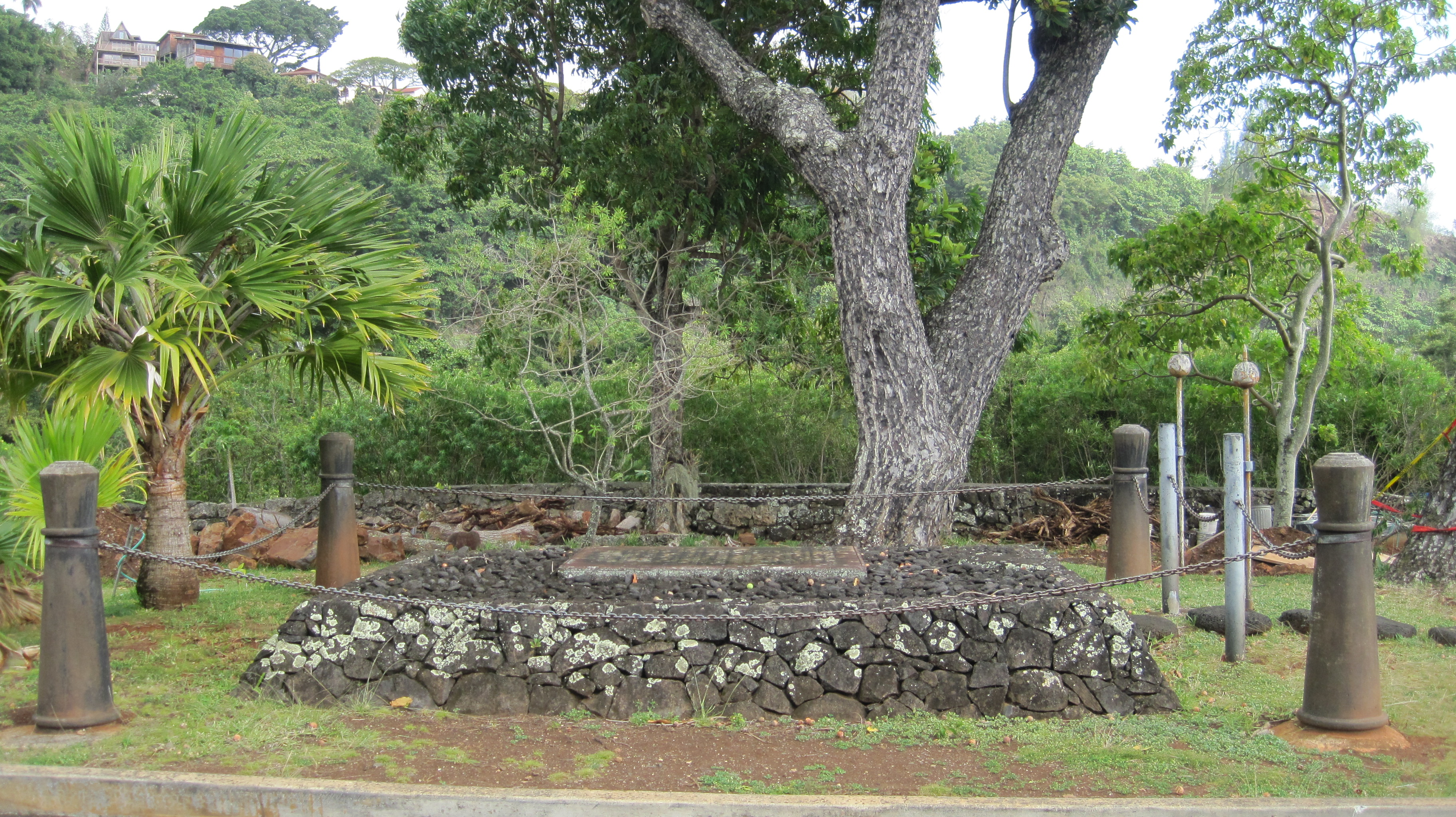
John Young's gravesite

- John Young (c. 1742–1835)
- High Chiefess Kaʻōanaʻeha (c. 1780–1850)

== Abigail Kinoiki Kekaulike Kawānanakoa Tomb ==
- Princess Abigail Kinoiki Kekaulike Kawānanakoa (1926–2022)

== Unsure ==
The following are some names whose identities or which tombs they are interred in are not known for sure. The men are identified by a (k) for kāne (Hawaiian for "male" or "man"), and the women by a (w) for wahine (H: female or woman).

- Kamānele (w, 1814–1834), fiancée of Kamehameha III.
- Alapaʻi (w), probably Julia Alapaʻi, the wife of Keoni Ana.
- Naʻea (k), probably George Naʻea, the biological father of Queen Emma.
- Kaʻeo (k), probably Joshua Kaʻeo, uncle of Queen Emma.
- Kepoʻokawelo (n), unknown
- Nueu or Nunu (k), brother of Kaleioku, high priest of Lono.
- Kakohe (k), brother of Kaleioku, high priest of Lono, advisor of ʻUmi-a-Līloa.
- Kapiʻolani I, but other sources says she is still buried in the plot at Pohukaina.
- Haʻalilio, but other sources says he is still at Pohukaina or buried in a neglected grave in the Kawaiahaʻo Cemetery.

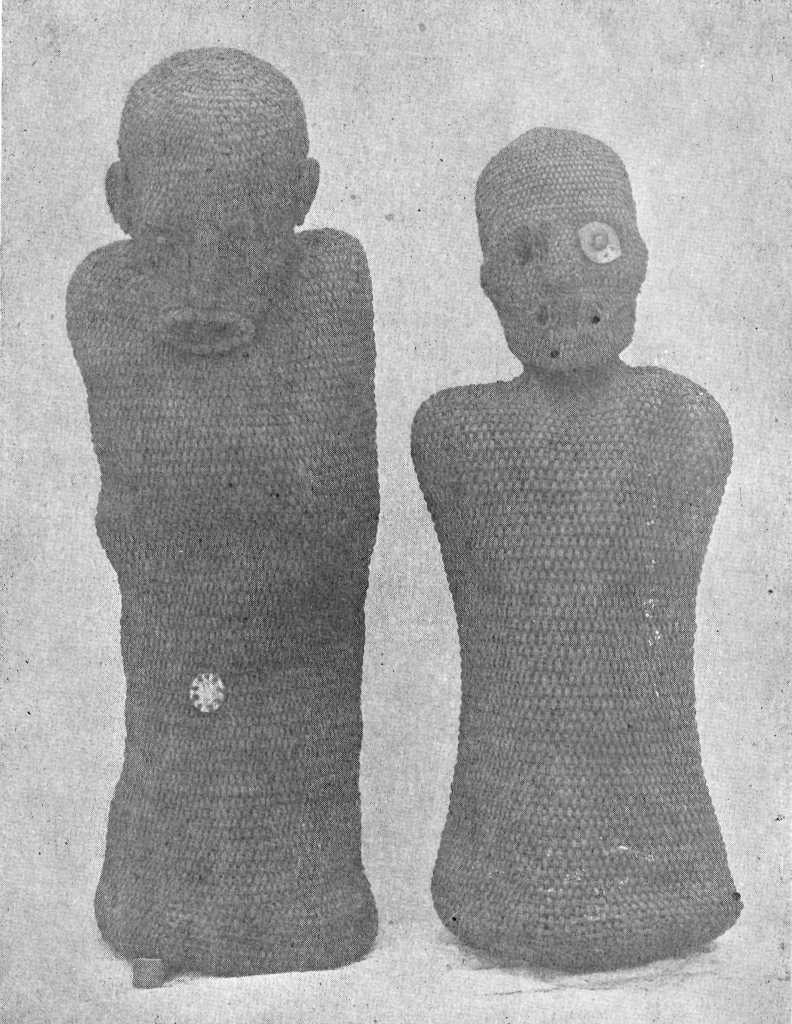
The kāʻai of Līloa and Lonoikamakahiki

- Two basketry kāʻai containing the ʻiwi (bones) of Līloa and Lonoikamakahiki the only discernible remains rescued from Hale O Keawe and Hale O Līloa by Queen Kaʻahumanu and later transported to Oʻahu by King Kamehameha IV. These remains were later transferred to the Bernice Pauahi Bishop Museum on the authorization of Prince Kūhiō.
- A bundle of bones wrapped in kapa and red silk with King Kalākaua's signet ring. These were once thought to be the remains of Kamehameha I. Last mentioned in 1918 as still remaining in the main chapel by Bill Maiʻoho.
- The other remains of 23 kings of chiefs rescued from Hale O Keawe and Hale O Līloa were placed in two caskets containing the ʻiwi (bones) of Keohokuma, Okua, Umioopa, Keaweluaole, Keaweakapeleaumoku, Kuaialii, Kaaloa, Lonoakolii, Kaleioku, Kalaimamahu, and Kaoleioku in one coffin, and in another coffin are the remains of Keawe, Kumukoa, Lonoikahaupu, Huikihe, Kekoamano, Keaweakanuha, Niula, Kowaiululani, Lonoamoana, Lonohonuakini, Ahaula, Okanaloaikaiwilewa. These names are undiscernible in their original forms and historians speculate they may be Keaweʻīkekahialiʻiokamoku, his father and sons, Lonoikahaupu, Kalaniʻōpuʻu, Kaʻōleiokū, and Kalaʻimamahu. No sources stated they were moved to the Royal Mausoleum from Pohukaina so according to historian John F. G. Stokes, they are still buried at Pohukaina.
