= Wahine Piʻo =

Hawaiian politician and royal consort (d. 1826)

Kahakuhaʻakoi Wahine Piʻo
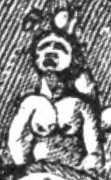
- Illustration of a mourning Wahinepio from Memoir of Keopuolani, late queen of the Sandwich Islands by William Richards
- Died: May 20–26, 1826; Mokuʻula, Lāhainā, Maui
- Burial: Mokuʻula then Waineʻe Cemetery
- Spouse: Kamehameha I Kalaʻimamahu; Kahōʻanokū Kīnaʻu; Kaukuna Kahekili
- Issue: Kahalaiʻa Luanuʻu; Kekauʻōnohi
- Father: Kekuamanoha
- Mother: Kamakahukilani

Kahakuhaʻakoi Wahinepiʻo (died 1826) was a Hawaiian chiefess and member of the royal family during the Kingdom of Hawaiʻi. Wahinepiʻo means captive women in Hawaiian. Sometimes she is called Wahineopiʻo, or an extra ʻokina is added, calling her Kahakuhaʻakoʻi. She was also called Kamoʻonohu. She was considered Kamehameha I's third favorite wife and served as female Governor of Maui, an act unheard of at the time in the western world, but common in Hawaiian history.

== Life ==
She was born on the island kingdom of Maui. Her father was Kekuamanoha, and her mother was Kamakahukilani, the niece of her father. Through her father she was a granddaughter of Kekaulike, the King or Moʻi of Maui. Her mother was the daughter of Kauhiaimokuakama, the eldest son of Kekaulike, who was denied the right of succession to the throne of Maui due to his mother Kahawalu's inferior rank in contrast to Kekaulike's other wife Kekuiapoiwa I. Supported by King Peleioholani of Oahu, he fought against his younger half-brother Kamehamehanui Ailuau, who was assisted by the King of the Big Island Alapainui, at the Battle of Keawawa. The battle ended in a stalemate, but Kauhiaimokuakama was captured and drowned by Alapainui's orders. Her siblings included Kalanimoku, Boki, Governor of Oʻahu, and Manono II, the wife of Keaoua Kekuaokalani. She was cousin of Kaʻahumanu, Kalākua Kaheiheimālie, and Namahana Piʻia, Kuakini, Governor of Hawaiʻi; and Keʻeaumoku II, who later served as her predecessor as Governor of Maui.

Born Kahakuhaʻakoi, details of her early life are scarce. She grew up in the court of her uncle King Kahekili II of Maui. During her early childhood her father Kekuamanoha helped Kahekili conquer the island of Oahu, and was the chief responsible for the capture and execution of its King, Kahahana, who was his own brother-in-law. Afterward Kahekili set up his court on Oahu. She probably stay on in Maui with her aunt Kalola, the most senior chiefess of Maui at the time, and her cousin Kalanikauikaʻalaneo (later named Keōpūolani), Kalola's granddaughter. When Maui forces under Kalanikūpule, Kahekili's son and regent in his absence, lost to Kamehameha I at the Battle of Kepaniwai, Kalola along with her family tried to flee to Oahu. They stopped in Molokai as sickness overcame the elderly Kalola, and were caught by Kamehameha's forces. The dying Kalola offered her granddaughter Keōpūolani as a future bride in exchange for peace. Other Maui chiefesses, including Kahakuhaʻakoi, also joined Kamehameha's court. She and her cousin both shared the new name Wahinepio (captive women) commemorating this event. Her cousin later adopted the name Keōpūolani, while Kahakuhaʻakoi is mainly called Wahinepio by historians throughout the rest of her life.

=== Marriages ===
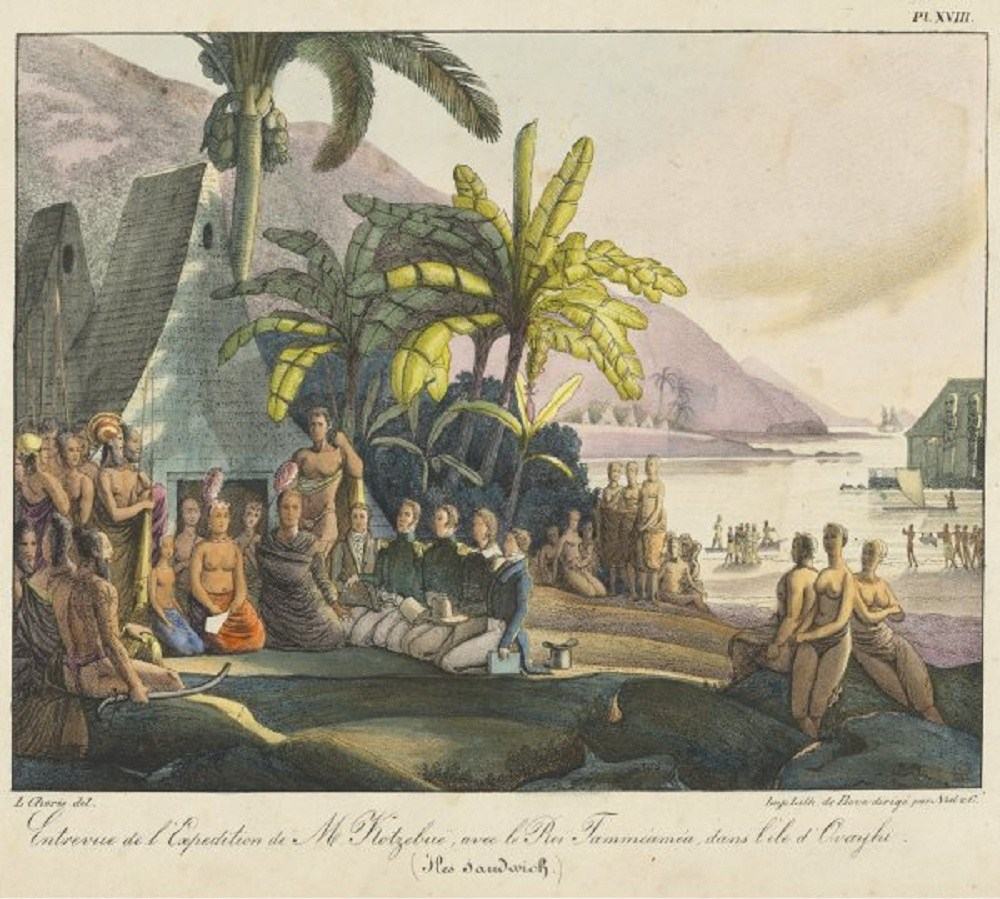
Royal Court of King Kamehameha I at Kailua-Kona, c. 1816

Kamehameha I married most of the women he took captive because they were the highest-ranking women in all the Hawaiian Islands and any children bore by them would hold the highest mana or spiritual power. Wahinepio married Kamehameha around that time. She was related to everyone of Kamehameha's wives; her cousins mentioned above were all married to the king, and her younger sister Manono was later to be one of two young women taken by Kamehameha "to warm his old age". She was considered to be Kamehameha's third favorite wife, after Kaʻahumanu and Kaheiheimālie, although Keōpūolani was his most sacred wife. Like Kaʻahumanu she had no children by Kamehameha.

She and Kamehameha separated in the early 1800s, around the time he married Kaheiheimālie. As a sort of compensation Kamehameha may have given Wahinepio to Kaheiheimālie's first husband, his half-brother, Kalaʻimamahu. Kamehameha gave many of his wives to his trusted friends and relatives. Remarriage was common among the chiefs of Hawaiʻi, and many chiefesses could even choose to have more than one husband at a time. She had a son Kahalaiʻa Luanuʻu by her second husband. Some sources state he was the product of her third marriage and not her second marriages, but most historian agree that he was Kalaʻimamahu's son. Kahalaiʻa would later be appointed Governor of Kauaʻi after helping suppress the Humehume rebellion in 1824. He had a possible daughter Keʻelikōlani and an unnamed son from his fourth and fifth marriages, respectively.

Her second marriage didn't last long, and she remarried to Kahōʻanokū Kīnaʻu, the eldest surviving legitimate son of Kamehameha by his wife Peleuli. According to Hawaiian tradition Kīnaʻu would have been Kamehameha's heir to the throne as his eldest son, instead his younger half-brother Liholiho was chosen to be Kamehameha's heir due to his mother Keōpūolani's higher rank. This is ironic considering Wahinepio's own grandfather had been denied his right to the throne because of the inferior rank of his own mother. Tradition tells of a story, recorded down by John Papa ʻĪʻī, that once while traveling with Kīnaʻu from Honolulu to Waikīkī, an offering of fishes were made to the couples by Kinopu from Moehonua's fishpond in Kālia. At the moment the sea came into the pond and fishes of every kind entered the sluice gate. Fish nets were cast and the harvest was so abundant that a great heap of fish lay spoiling upon the bank of the pond. When word of this reached Kamehameha, instead of being pleased, was displeased at that their waste of food. Kalanimoku, who was by the king's side at the time, ordered that Kinopu release most of the fish. When Kalaʻimamahu heard of what his nephew had done, his anger was kindled against him. With Kīnaʻu she had a daughter named Kekauʻōnohi, who later became one of the five wives of Kamehameha II and later Governor of Kauaʻi. Kekauʻōnohi had a son, but he died young. Kīnaʻu died around 1809 leaving her a widow.

Her final marriage was to Kaukuna Kahekili, who was descended from the Kings of Maui like herself and had Spanish blood in his vein. Her fourth husband had absolutely no power and served no post under Kaʻahumanu, although he had help lead an army of a thousand soldier to Kauai with Hoapili and Kaikioʻewa to assist her brother Kalanimoku and her son Kahalaiʻa put down the Humehume uprising in 1824. He was noted as a stern warrior with great strength and many battle scars. No known children came from this union.

=== Governor of Maui ===
Wahinepio died May 26. She served as governor of Maui at one point as one of the few female governors in the kingdom's history.

Like many Hawaiian chiefesses at the time, Wahinepio was a giant of a woman. Reverend Stewart observed that she weighed no less than four hundred pounds. But like many females of rank, she became accustomed to Western dress and may have become self-conscious about her weight and thought of eating less poi, so her clothes could sit better. She became part of the first generation of Hawaiian women to be bothered by their appearance and inability to fit the mold of Western femininity. This came at the cost of lowering the status and right of Hawaiian women, and subsequent generations' only notion of being a woman was to follow their subservient Puritanic sisters.

=== Christianity ===
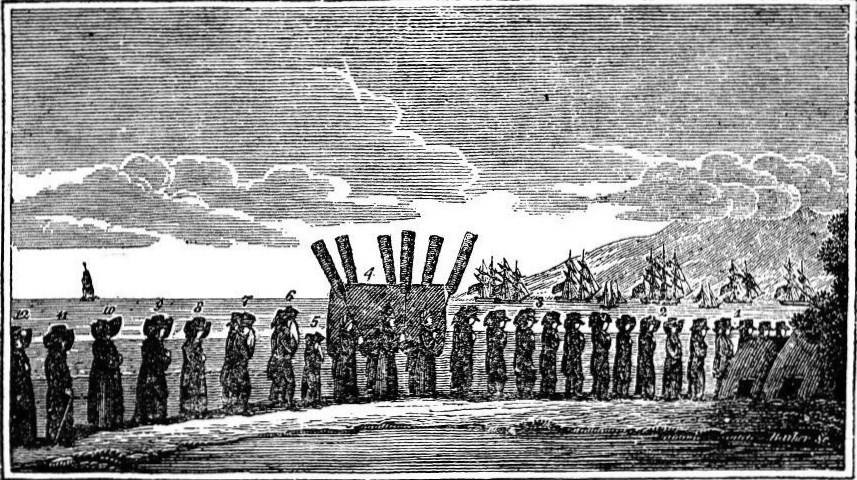
Wahinepio in the Christian funeral procession of Queen Keōpūolani, 1823

When the Christian missionaries arrived Wahinepio accepted Christianity along with Queen Keōpūolani, Hoapili, Nāhiʻenaʻena, Keʻeaumoku II, Kekauʻōnohi, Kahekili, and Kaiko and his wife Haʻaheo Kaniu who all attended classes set up by the missionaries. After Keōpūolani's death in 1823, many of the chiefs returned to some of the old ways including Wahinepio, who allowed most of her subjects to do as they wish. She was said to have been the principal agent in leading the princess to return to worshipping the old Hawaiian gods in 1824, a year after the death of her mother. Wahinepio may have assumed a motherly role over the recently orphaned princess. Although not for long because Nāhiʻenaʻena return to the Christian faith the following year and forbade anyone to enter her house who could no read hymns, targeting Wahinepio who couldn't read. The angry Wahinepio likewise forbade any to enter her house who was not skilful in dancing, referring to the pagan hula forbidden by the missionaries. She may have eventually reconverted, but she was never considered a devout Christian and was clearly disliked by Reverend Richards and Reverend Bingham. Her refusal to bend to Western ways or submitting to Christianity and her strong belief in the old Hawaiian ways was identical to her possible granddaughter Princess Ruth Keʻelikōlani.

Reverend Richard tells of a change of heart by Wahinepio, in an account involving a Hawaiian girl Leoiki under her care. The sixteen-year-old girl Leoiki was an attentive student of the Christian missionaries. She had attracted the eyes of Captain William Buckle of the British whaleship Daniel IV, who resolved to have her board his vessel. She pleaded to be spared, but Wahinepio allow her to be taken for the payment of sixteen doubloons, valued at ten dollars each, and Leoiki was taken on board for seven months, according to Richard's as a slave. Wahinepio soon confessed that she had done wrong. She gave the coins to Nāhiʻenaʻena who refused them, and according to legends the coins were placed among the treasures left by Kamehameha II. Afterward laws were placed throughout the islands forbidding women to visit ships for immoral purposes much to the anger of visiting sailors. Although, this might just be missionary propaganda.

Other accounts seems to suggest that Wahinepio took the payment as dowry and assurance of her return. And that Leoiki, instead of being sold, married Captain Buckle and had a son with him, born on February 5, 1826, as a British citizen on board the Daniel IV. The boy was named William Wahinepiʻo Kahakuhaʻakoi Buckle in honor of her, and he served in King Kalakaua's privy council and was the first warden of Oahu prison. Leoiki's granddaughter Jane Kahakuwaiaoao Keakahiwalani Buckle Clark was a lady-in-waiting of Queen Liliʻuokalani during her 1895 imprisonment in ʻIolani Palace.

=== Death and legacy ===
In 1826, an epidemic of whooping cough and bronchitis swept across Hawaii, claiming the lives of many Hawaiians who lack natural immunity to the disease. Her son Kahalaiʻa and his son, her grandson, fell victim to the epidemic in April of that year. This double loss brought great sorrow to Wahinepio. Her grief weakened her constitution even further, and added with the rapid cultural change Hawaii due to the arrival of the missionaries, she succumbed to the epidemic. She died at Mokuʻula, the royal residence of Kamehameha III, in May 1826. She was given the honor of being buried at Mokuʻula, where Keōpūolani and Nahi`ena`ena had been interred and where Wahinepio's daughter Kekauʻōnohi would be buried too. Her remains along with other royals were assumed to have been transported to the Waineʻe Church, later renamed the Waiola Church, in Lāhainā.

Wahinepio Avenue in Kahului, next to Maui Community College and Maui Nui Botanical Gardens, is named after her.

== Ancestry ==
Ancestors of Wahine Piʻo

16. Lonohonuakini
8. Kaulahea II (=#24)
17. Kalanikauanakinilani
4. Kekaulike (=#12)
18. ʻUmi-a-Liloa II
9. Papaikaniau Lonoikaniau (=#25)
19. Kuihewamakawalu
2. Kekuamanoha
20. Kauaua-a-Mahi
10. Haʻae-a-Mahi
21. Kalanikauleleiaiwi
5. Haʻaloʻu
22. Kaʻalo-a-Piʻi
11. Kalelemauliokalani
23. Kaneikaheilani
1. Kahakuhaʻakoi Wahinepio
24. Kaulahea II (=#8)
12. Kekaulkie (=#4)
25. Papaikaniau Lonoikaniau (=#9)
6. Kauhiaimoku-a-Kama
13. Kahawalu
3. Kamakahukilani
28. Kookuiniaumakaokalani
14. Kainahopukahi
29. Kahoowaha
7. Luukia
15. Kauopuuikanuumealani

Preceded by Keʻeaumoku II	Royal Governor of Maui ca. 1820s	Succeeded by Hoapili
