= Kekauʻōnohi =

Hawaiian high chiefess (c. 1805–1851)

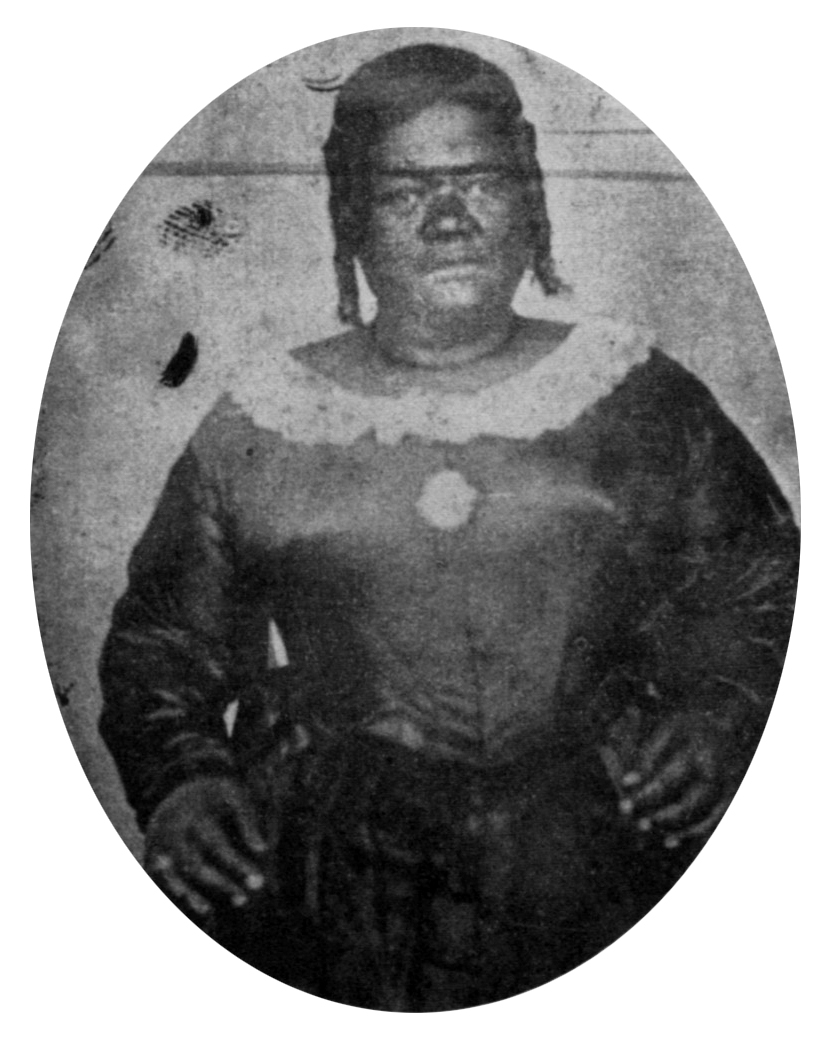
- Born: c. 1805; Lahaina, Maui
- Died: June 2, 1851; Honolulu, Oʻahu
- Burial: June 30, 1851; Pohukaina then Waiola Cemetery
- Spouse: Kamehameha II (as Queen); Kahalaiʻa Luanuʻu; Kealiʻiahonui; Levi Haʻalelea
- Issue: William Pitt Kīnaʻu II; Abigail Maheha (hānai); Mary Ann Kiliwehi (hānai); Anna Kaiʻulani (hānai)
Names
- Miriam or Mikahela Keahikuni Kekauʻōnohi
- House: House of Kamehameha
- Father: Kahōʻanokū Kīnaʻu
- Mother: Kahakuhaʻakoi Wahinepio

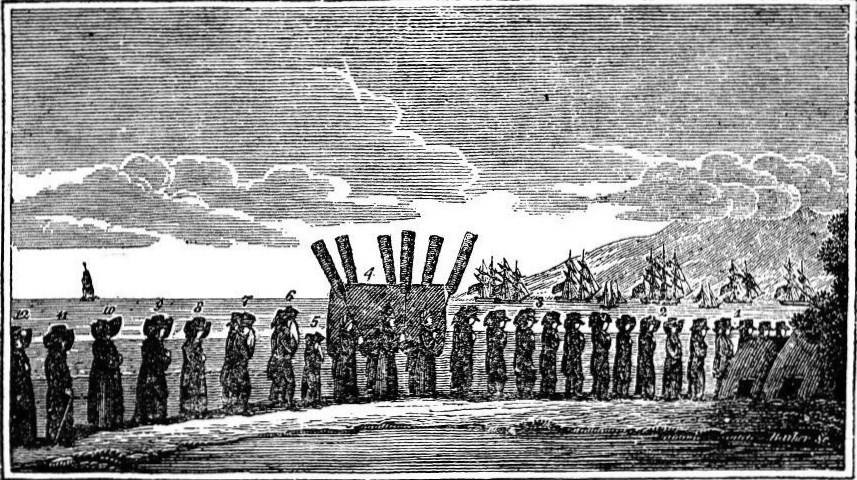
Kekauʻōnohi, alongside the pall-bearers in the center of funeral procession of Queen Keōpūolani, 1823

Keahikuni Kekauʻōnohi (c. 1805–1851) was a Hawaiian high chiefess who was a member of the House of Kamehameha. She was granddaughter to King Kamehameha I and one of the wives of Kamehameha II. Her Christian name is disputed; it is given as Mikahela in the 1848 Mahele Book and as Miriam in later sources.

== Biography ==
She was born circa 1805 at Lahaina, Maui. Her father was Kahōʻanokū Kīnaʻu. Her mother was Kahakuhaʻakoi Wahinepio, sister of Boki and Kalanimoku and granddaughter of Aliʻi Nui, Kekaulike of Maui. Her father was a son of Kamehameha I and his wife Peleuli, daughter of Kamanawa, one of the royal twins.

She married her uncle Kamehameha II. She was one of his five wives. Others were Kamāmalu, Pauahi, Kīnaʻu, and Kekāuluohi. She was the youngest, but Kamāmalu was Liholiho's favorite. She was at the famous meal when the kapu system was overturned in 1819, known as the ʻAi Noa. After Liholiho's death in London, she went to Kauaʻi to live with her half-brother Kahalaiʻa Luanuʻu, who served as governor of Kauaʻi from 1824 to 1825.

Kekauʻōnohi served as a governor of the island of Kauaʻi some time around 1840–1845 and was a stanch Protestant. Kamehameha III created the House of Nobles in the Hawaiian Constitution of 1840. She was among the first members along with the King, Hoapiliwahine, Pākī, Kōnia, Keohokalole, Kuakini, Kahekili, Leleiohoku I, Kekūanaōʻa, Kealiʻiahonui, Kanaʻina, Keoni ʻĪʻī, Keoni Ana, and Haʻalilio.

After the death of Kuhina Nui, Kaʻahumanu in 1832, she remarried Kealiʻiahonui, former aliʻi of Kauaʻi and the son of Al'iʻI Nui, Kaumualiʻi of Kauaʻi. They had no children. After his death in 1849 she remarried Levi Haʻalelea, a relative of Queen Kalama (wife of Kamehameha III) and had a son named William Pitt Kīnaʻu, who died young. After the Great Mahele in 1848, Kekauʻōnohi was given the second-largest land allotments, seventy-seven ʻāina (land parcels), making her the largest landholder after the King. She inherited most of the land of her uncle William Pitt Kalanimoku along with land given to her by her other relatives: Kamehameha III, Kaukuna Kahekili, Kaiko, Koahou, her aunt Maheha, her mother Kahakuhaʻakoi Wahinepio and Hao.

Kekauʻōnohi died in Honolulu June 2, 1851 age 46. She was described as "the last of the old stock of chiefs – one of the best of them – good-natured, benevolent, liberal and generous". She was initially buried at the Pohukaina Tomb, located on grounds of ʻIolani Palace, but her remains were later transported to Maui where they were buried in the cemetery at Waiola Church.

She left her land to her husband Haʻalelea. She was foster mother of her nieces Abigail Maheha, Mary Ann Kiliwehi and Anna Kaiʻulani.

When the Admiral Henry Byam Martin, aboard HMS Grampus, visited the islands in 1846, he described the Princess Kikuanoki:

The arrival of Kikuanoki — granddaughter of Kamehameha 1st and 1st cousin of the present King — was a treat. She sailed into the room with all the pomp and majesty of Q. Elizabeth. Her dress — evidently got up for the occasion — was a very transparent muslin shirt — through which those parts of her person which in most countries are covered were very visible. A green crape shawl — and a band of red & yellow (the royal colours) round her head completed her costume.

== Bibliography ==
- Bingham, Hiram (1855) [1848]. A Residence of Twenty-one Years in the Sandwich Islands (Third ed.). Canandaigua, NY: H. D. Goodwin.
- Biographical Sketch of His Majesty King Kalakaua. Honolulu: P. C. Advertiser Steam Printing Office. 1884. pp. 72–74. OCLC 12787107.
- Forbes, David W., ed. (2001). Hawaiian National Bibliography, 1780-1900. Vol. 3. Honolulu: University of Hawaii Press. pp. 11, 390. ISBN 0-8248-2503-9.
- Freycinet, Louis de (1978). Kelly, Marion (ed.). Hawaií in 1819: A Narrative Account. Honolulu: Department of Anthropology, Bernice Pauahi Bishop Museum.
- Hawaii Supreme Court; Davis, Robert G. (1866). "L Keelikolani v. James Robinson". Reports of a Portion of the Decisions Rendered by the Supreme Court of the Hawaiian Islands in Law, Equity, Admiralty, and Probate. Vol. 2. pp. 514–552.
- Hill, Samuel S. (1856). Travels in the Sandwich and Society Islands. London: Chapman & Hall. pp. 207–208.
- Joesting, Edward (1988). Kauai: The Separate Kingdom. Honolulu: University of Hawaii Press. ISBN 978-0-8248-1162-4.
- Kam, Ralph Thomas (2017). Death Rites and Hawaiian Royalty: Funerary Practices in the Kamehameha and Kalakaua Dynasties, 1819–1953. S. I.: McFarland, Incorporated, Publishers. ISBN 978-1-4766-6846-8. OCLC 966566652.
- Kamakau, Samuel (1992) [1961]. Ruling Chiefs of Hawaii (Revised ed.). Honolulu: Kamehameha Schools Press. ISBN 0-87336-014-1.
- Kameʻeleihiwa, Lilikalā (1992). Native Land and Foreign Desires. Honolulu: Bishop Museum Press. ISBN 0-930897-59-5.
- Liliuokalani (1898). Hawaii's Story by Hawaii's Queen, Liliuokalani. Boston: Lee and Shepard. ISBN 978-0-548-22265-2.
- Lydecker, Robert Colfax, ed. (1918). Roster Legislatures of Hawaii, 1841-1918. Honolulu: Hawaiian Gazette Company.
- Martin, Henry Byam (1981). The Polynesian Journal of Captain Henry Byam Martin, R. N. (PDF). Canberra: Australian National University Press. hdl:1885/114833. ISBN 978-0-7081-1609-8. OCLC 8329030.
- Pratt, Elizabeth Kekaaniauokalani Kalaninuiohilaukapu (2009) [1920]. Daniel Logan (ed.). History of Keoua Kalanikupuapa-i-nui: Father of Hawaii Kings, and His Descendants. Honolulu: republished by Kessinger Publishing. ISBN 978-1-104-76661-0.
- Reynolds, Stephen (1989). Joerger, Pauline King (ed.). Journal of Stephen Reynolds: 1823–1829. Honolulu: Ku Paʻa Incorporated. ISBN 978-0-914916-80-2. OCLC 20465590.
- Stewart, Charles Samuel (1839). Ellis, William (ed.). A Residence in the Sandwich Islands. Boston: Weeks, Jordan & Company.

Preceded by Keaweamahi	Royal Governor of Kauaʻi; 1842–1845	Succeeded by Paul Kanoa
