= Leleiohoku =

Leleiohoku may refer to:

- Leleiohoku I, William Pitt Leleiohoku I, (1821–1848), Hawaiian Kingdom chief
- Leleiohoku II, William Pitt Leleiohoku Kalahoolewa II, (1854-1877), Hawaiian Kingdom prince
