= Kahekili =

Kahekili may refer to:

- Kahekili I, early king of Maui
- Kahekili II (c. 1737–1794), king of the island of Maui and Oahu
- Kaukuna Kahekili, a Hawaiian high chief during the early period of the Kingdom of Hawaii
- Kahekili Highway, a 35-mile road on West Maui, Hawaii
