= Peleuli =

Hawaiian chiefess and queen (fl. 19th century)

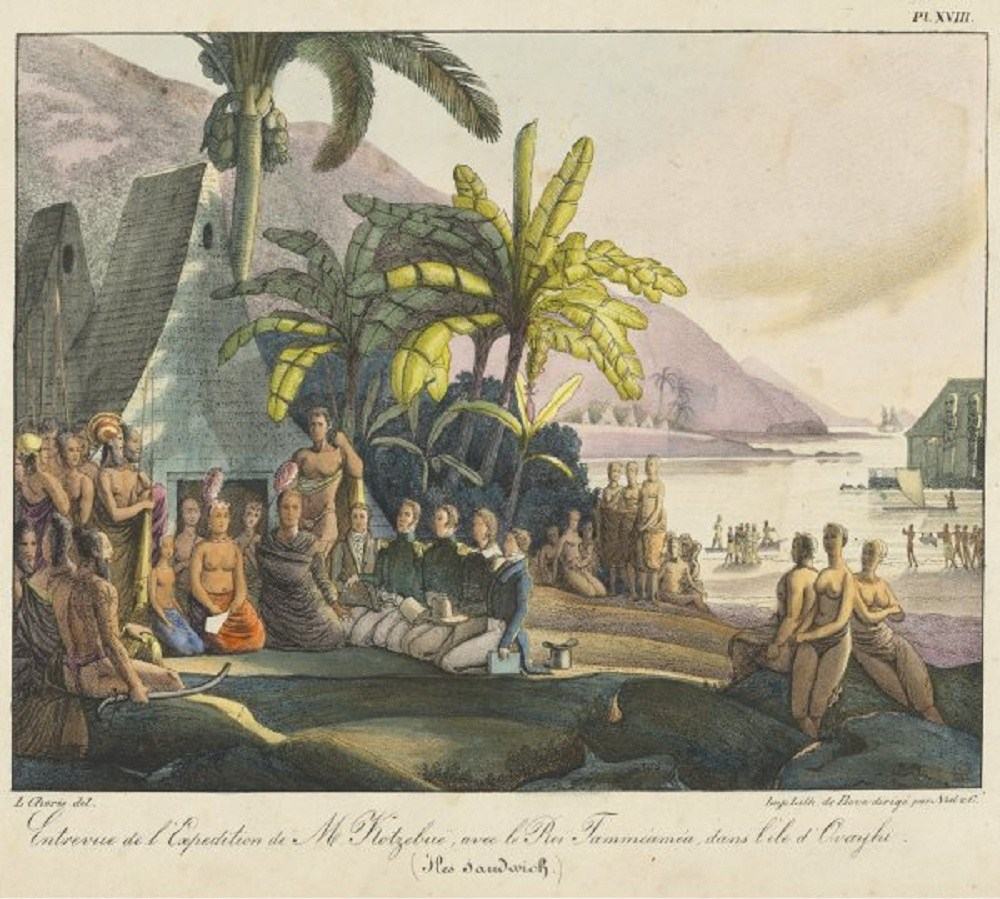
- Royal Court of Kamehameha I at Kailua-Kona, c. 1816
- Spouse: Kamehameha I Kaweloʻokalani
- Issue: Maheha Kapulikoliko; Kahōʻanokū Kīnaʻu; Kaikoʻokalani; Kiliwehi; Kīnaʻu (hānai)
Names
- Peleuli-i-Kekela-o-kalani
- Father: Kamanawa
- Mother: Kekelaokalani-a-Kauakahiakua

Peleuli (fl. 19th century), formally Peleuli-i-Kekela-o-kalani, was a Queen consort of the Kingdom of Hawaii as a wife of king Kamehameha I.

== Biography ==
She was a daughter of High Chief Kamanawa and High Chiefess Kekelaokalani. Her father, along with his brother Kameʻeiamoku, were known as one of the "royal twins" who helped Kamehameha I come to power and served as advisors. Her mother was the daughter of High Chief Kauakahiakua, son of Lonomakahonua and Kahapoohiwi, and High Chiefess Kekuʻiapoiwa I, once the wife of King Kekaulike of Maui. She had three brothers: Koahou, Noukana and Amamalua, and a half-sister Piʻipiʻi Kalanikaulihiwakama.

In 1920, Elizabeth Kekaaniau published a book recounting the history of the descendants of Keōua. In the book, Elizabeth Kekaaniau stated that Piʻipiʻi Kalanikaulihiwakama and Peleuli were the daughters of Keōua and Kekuʻiapoiwa II, therefore full-blood sisters of Kamehameha I. Many sources also incorrectly call her an aunt of Kamehameha I because of Queen Liliuokalani's autobiography Hawaii's Story by Hawaii's Queen, which confused Peleuli's mother Kekelaokalani-a-Kauakahiakua with Kekuʻiapoiwa II's mother Kekelakekeokalani-a-Keawe. Hawaiian historian Samuel Kamakau stated that Peleuli was the aunt of Keōpūolani, whom she served as an attendant.

Peleuli was given in marriage to Kamehameha I by her father after the former's victory at the Battle of Mokuʻōhai while Kamanawa took Kamehameha's mother Kekuʻiapoiwa II as his wife, cementing an alliance between their families. She was his second wife because up to that point, Kamehameha had only one other wife Kalola-a-Kumukoʻa.

According to Kamakau, she was considered his fifth favorite wife, behind Kaʻahumanu, Kalākua Kaheiheimālie, Kahakuhaʻakoi Wahinepio, and Keōpūolani, his highest ranking consort. With Kamehameha I, she was the mother of four children, including: Maheha Kapulikoliko, a daughter, Kahōʻanokū Kīnaʻu, a son, who married Wahinepio; Kaikoʻokalani, a son, who married Haʻaheo Kaniu; and Kiliwehi, a daughter, who married of Kamehamehakauokoa and probably Kalanimoku. Her grandchildren were Kekauʻōnohi by Kīnaʻu and Leleiohoku I by Kiliwehi. Her progenies with Kamehameha were his eldest children, with the exception of his illegitimate son Pauli Kaʻōleiokū by his aunt Kānekapōlei, but they were passed over in the line of succession in favor of his descendants by Keōpūolani and Kalākua Kaheiheimālie because of their superior rank.

She later married to Kaweloʻokalani, her husband's younger half-brother and the son of Keōua and Kamakaeheikuli. This marriage occurred while Kamehameha was still alive and the couple lived in the King's household. She and Kaweloʻokalani had no children, although one source says that Kaukuna Kahekili was the son of Kaweloʻokalani and Peleuli. They adopted (hānai) the youngest daughter of Kamehameha I and Kalākua Kaheiheimālie. She named the child Kīnaʻu after her own son and took her back to the island of Hawaiʻi after Kamehameha moved his capital back to Kailua-Kona. Another hānai child and namesake was Elizabeth Peleuli II, who became the ancestor of the Crowningburg family.

After Kamehameha I's death, his son Liholiho succeeded him as Kamehameha II and they were both included as a part of his court. The last mention of her or her husband states that they moved to Lahaina on the island of Maui, which had become the new capital, in the 1820s. Her husband Kawelo died around 1824, and she probably died soon after if she had not already predeceased him.

== Ancestry ==
Ancestors of Peleuli

16. Kauakahilau =#16
8. Lonoikahaupu (=#10)
17. Kuluina =#17
4. Keawepoepoe
18. Kaneikaiwilani =#22, 30
9. Kalanikauleleaiwi (=#11, 15)
19. Keakealaniwahine =#23, 31
2. Kamanawa
20. Kauakahilau =#20
10. Lonoikahaupu (=#8)
21. Kuluina =#21
5. Kanoena
22. Kaneikaiwilani =#18, 30
11. Kalanikauleleaiwi (=#9, 15)
23. Keakealaniwahine =#19, 31
1. Peleuli
24. Lonohonuakini (=#28)
12. Lonomakaihonua
25. Kalanikauanakinilani (=#29)
6. Kauakahiakua
13. Kahapoʻohiwi
3. Kekelaokalani
28. Lonohonuakini (=#24)
14. Kaulahea II
29. Kalanikauanakinilani (=#25)
7. Kekuʻiapoiwanui
30. Kaneikaiwilani =#18, 22
15. Kalanikauleleaiwi =#9, 11
31. Keakealaniwahine =#19, 23
