= Kamānele =

Hawaiian high chiefess (d. 1834)

Mele Kaʻauʻamokuokamānele or Kamānele (c. 1814 – May 7, 1834) was a high chiefess of the Kingdom of Hawaii and the betrothed bride of King Kamehameha III. Her early death prevented the marriage from occurring. Her Hawaiian name Kamānele means "the sedan chair".

== Life ==
Born around circa 1814, her parents were John Adams Kuakini and Kaniuʻopiohaʻaheo. The Governor of the Island of Hawaii, her father Kuakini was the younger brother of Queen Kaʻahumanu, the favorite wife of Kamehameha I, who served as kuhina nui and regent for his successors King Kamehameha II and Kamehameha III. Her family descended from the aliʻi of Maui and Hawaii. In 1825, Kamānele and other chiefs attended the baptism of her aunt Queen Kaʻahumanu by Hiram Bingham I at the site where Kawaiahaʻo Church stands today. Kamānele most likely converted as well during this period and was christened with the name "Mele", the Hawaiian version of Mary. When her aunt died in 1832 Kamānele occupied the covered litter that brought her remains into the city of Honolulu for burial.

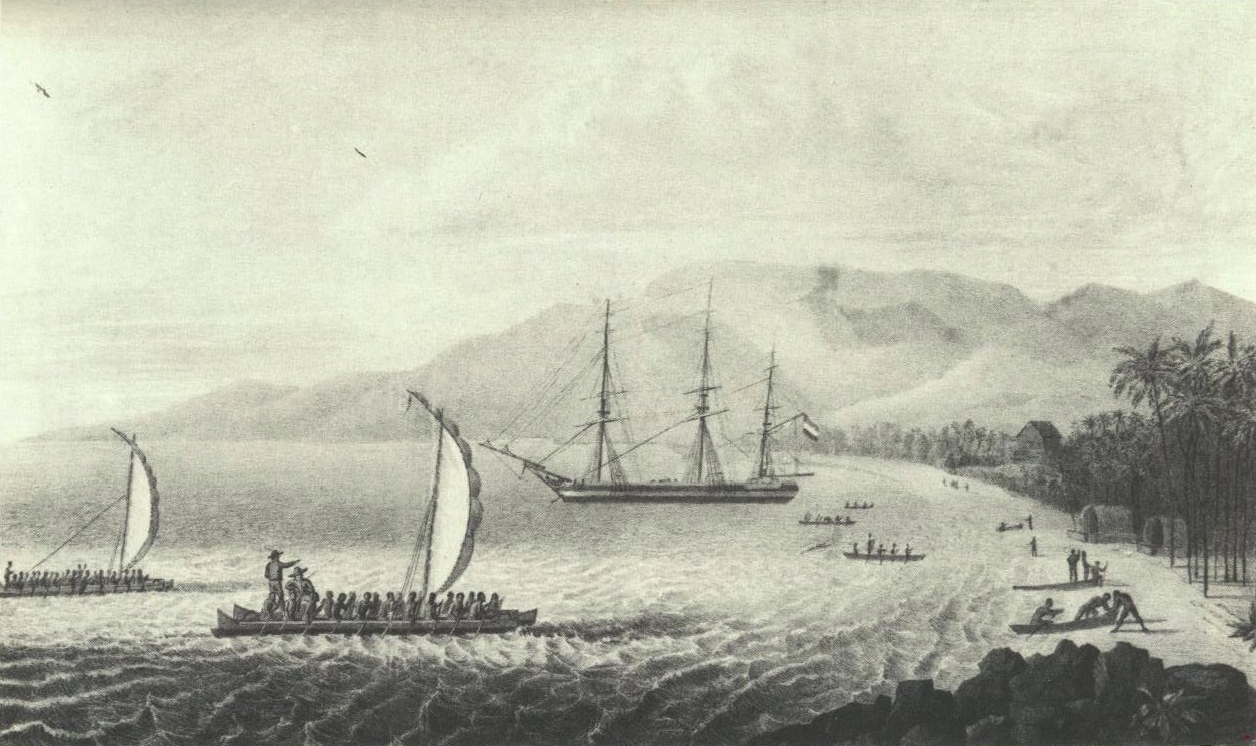
Governor Kuakini visiting the Wilhelmina and Maria at Kealakekua Bay, Hawaii

On February 3, 1828, the Dutch Captain Jacobus Boelen met with Kamānele and her father aboard the Wilhelmina and Maria at Kealakekua Bay. Boelen gave a description of the high chiefess whom he called "Princess Koakini":

Not long after we anchored, a large double canoe came alongside with Governor Adams' daughter, who, as Mr. French assured me, was to be the queen of the islands and was already betrothed to the present young king, Kauikeouli [Kauikeaouli]. Princess Koakini [Kuakini], who appeared to me to be a girl about fourteen years old, could well pride herself on being one of the beauties of the island. She was dressed in the European fashion — that is, except for all those various accouterments which our ladies use to complete their toilet. But I must say that this did not detract from the splendor of the beautiful stature or the charming features of the young princess. We received Her Highness with as much pomp as the lack of preparation for her arrival made possible. The girl was very sweet and friendly indeed. She stayed on board to have breakfast with me and her father and two other gentlemen. We then went ashore.

In 1832, Kamānele was betrothed to King Kamehameha III having been chosen by the chiefs as the most suitable bride in terms of age, rank and education. Around the same time, Kamehameha III had developed an incestuous relationship with his sister Princess Nāhiʻenaʻena. This latter union was strongly opposed by the Christian chiefs and the American missionaries. Before their marriage took place, Kamānele died on May 7, 1834. Around the same time, Keolaloa, the betrothed of Nāhiʻenaʻena, the sister of King Kamehameha III, died as well. They were both about nineteen or twenty years old. After their death and being rebuffed by his sister, Kamehameha III fell into a bout of depression and drunkenness, and attempted to commit suicide at his residence in Pu'uloa. The events of 1834 ultimately culminated in a brief, unrecognized union between the two siblings, but they were eventually pressured to separate and marry other individuals. Nāhiʻenaʻena married Leleiohoku in 1835 while Kamehameha III married Kalama in 1837.

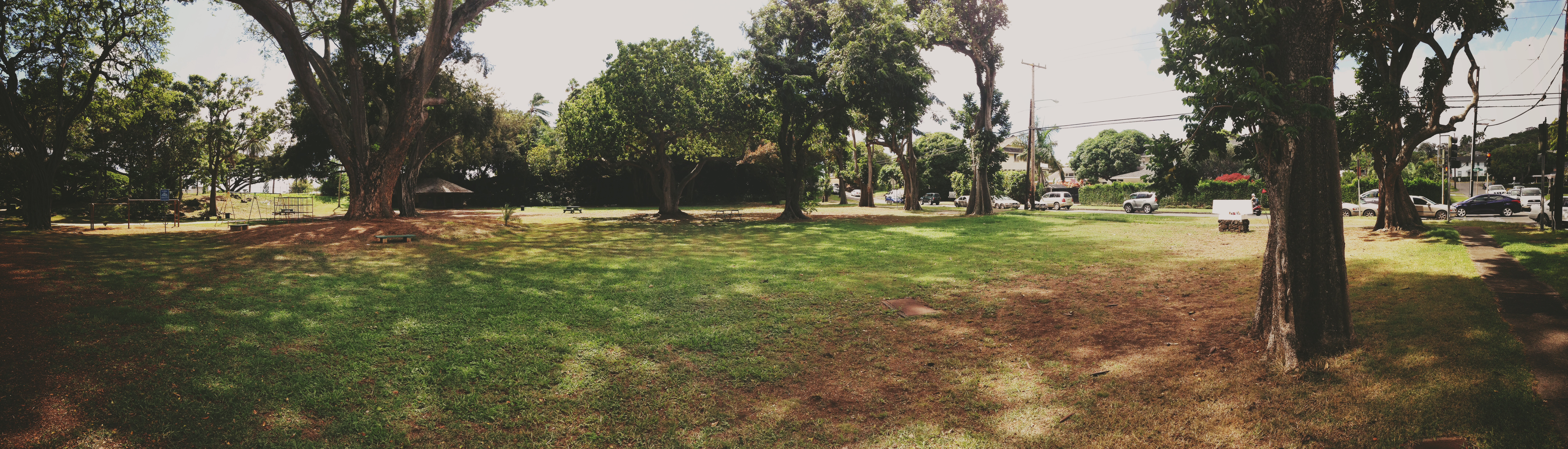
Kamanele Park was named after Kamanele in 1915.

Initially buried in the royal tomb at Pohukaina, Kamānele was reburied in 1865 at the Royal Mausoleum at Mauna ʻAla in the Nuʻuanu Valley. Built in 1915, Kamanele Park in Honolulu is named after her. The name was chosen by Mary Jane Montano because the chiefess once lived in the Mānoa Valley, where the park is located.

== Bibliography ==
- Bingham, Hiram (1855). A Residence of Twenty-one Years in the Sandwich Islands (Third ed.). Canandaigua, NY: H. D. Goodwin. OCLC 7294318.
- Boelen, Jacobus; Broeze, Frank (1988). A Merchant's Perspective: Captain Jacobus Boelen's Narrative of His Visit to Hawaiʻi in 1828. Honolulu: Hawaiian Historical Society. ISBN 978-0-945048-00-8. OCLC 18364753.
- Bouslog, Charles; Greig, Thelma (1994). Mānoa: the Story of a Valley. Honolulu: Mutual Publishing. ISBN 978-1-56647-067-4. OCLC 32599587.
- Borofsky, Robert (2000). Remembrance of Pacific Pasts: An Invitation to Remake History. Honolulu: University of Hawaii Press. ISBN 978-0-8248-2301-6. OCLC 246994158.
- Kamakau, Samuel (1992) [1961]. Ruling Chiefs of Hawaii (Revised ed.). Honolulu: Kamehameha Schools Press. ISBN 0-87336-014-1. OCLC 25008795.
- Pukui, Mary Kawena; Elbert, Samuel H.; Mookini, Esther T. (1974). Place Names of Hawaii. Honolulu: University of Hawaii Press. p. 81. ISBN 978-0-8248-0524-1. OCLC 1042464.
- Sinclair, Marjorie (1969). "Princess Nahienaena". The Hawaiian Journal of History. 3. Honolulu: Hawaiian Historical Society: 3–30. hdl:10524/247. OCLC 6062654.
- Sinclair, Marjorie (1976). Nāhiʻenaʻena, Sacred Daughter of Hawaiʻi. Honolulu: University Press of Hawaii. ISBN 978-0-8248-0367-4. OCLC 2373094.
- Winne, Jane Lathrop (1928). Kuakini and Hulihee: the Story of the Kailua Palace, Kona, Hawaii. Honolulu. OCLC 16333276.
