= Koahou =

Hawaiian high chief

- Died: 1826; Punahou, Hilo
- Spouse: various
- Father: Kamanawa
- Mother: Kekelaokalani

Koahou (died 1826) was a Hawaiian high chief who succeeded his father Kamanawa as one of the chief counselors of Kamehameha I.

== Life ==
He was the son of High Chief Kamanawa and High Chiefess Kekelaokalani. His father Kamanawa, along with Koahou's uncle Kameʻeiamoku, were known as the "royal twins" and helped Kamehameha I come to power and served him as advisors. His mother Kekelaokalani was the daughter of High Chief Kauakahiakua, son of Lonomakahonua and Kahapoohiwi, and High Chiefess Kekuʻiapoiwa I, the former wife of King Kekaulike of Maui. His siblings included two brothers: Noukana and Amamalua, a sister Peleuli, who became one of the wives of Kamehameha I, and a half-sister Piʻipiʻi Kalanikaulihiwakama.

After the death of his father and the passing of the last of the four warrior chiefs that supported Kamehameha I, the sons of the four were chosen to replace them in the Council of Chiefs. They included Koahou, son of Kamanawa, Hoapili, son of Kameʻeiamoku, Kahekili Keʻeaumoku, son of Keʻeaumoku Pāpaʻiahiahi and Naihe, son of Keaweaheulu. They were given the same honors, rights and powers that their fathers had held including any lands that were originally awarded to them as spoils of Kamehameha's conquest.

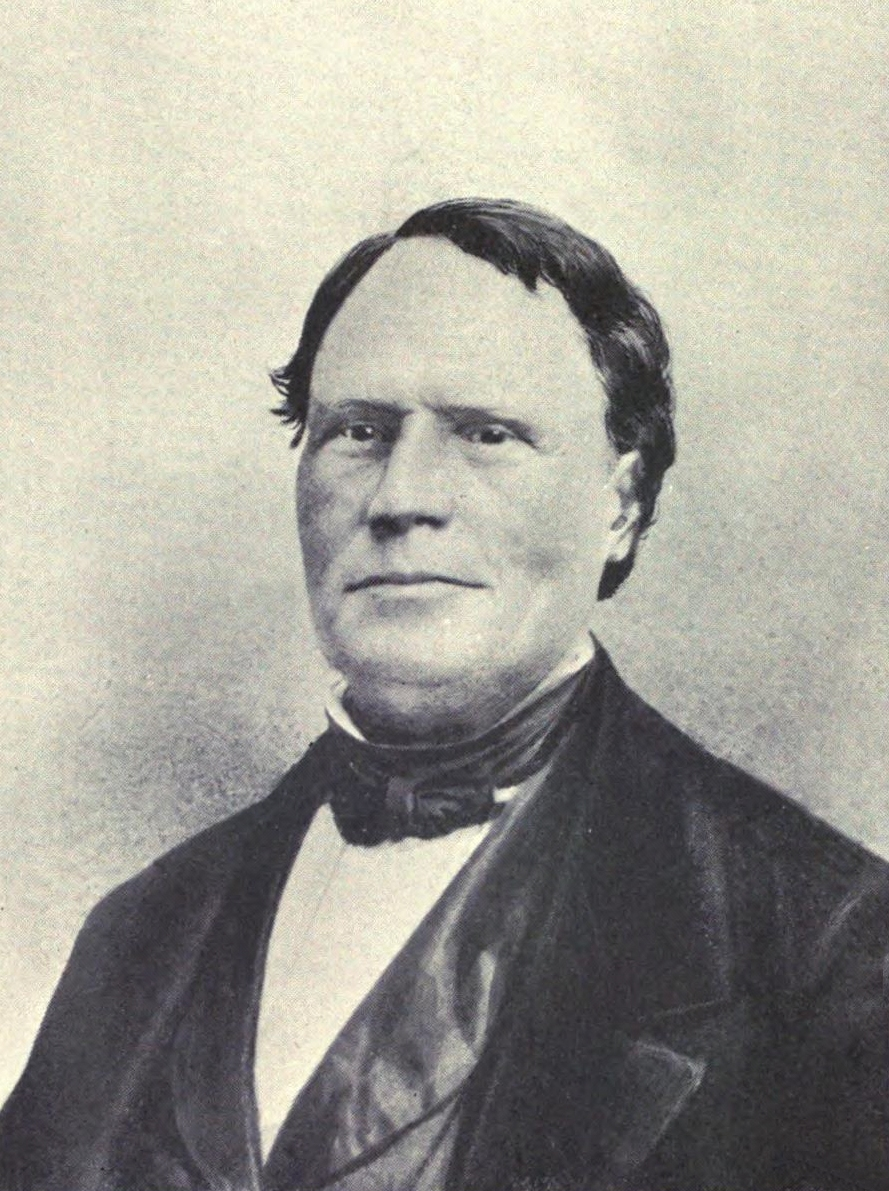
Rev. Artemas Bishop, 1857

Koahou would continue to serve Kamehameha I's successor Kamehameha II and briefly served under the child monarch Kamehameha III. His principal place of residence was Hilo, which was called Byron's Bay by the foreigners at the time after George Byron, 7th Baron Byron who brought the bodies of King Kamehameha II and Queen Kamāmalu back from London aboard HMS Blonde. Even after the arrival of the missionaries, Koahou never converted to Christianity or if he ever did, he didn't take their religious teaching very seriously. On December 25, 1825, Rev. Artemas Bishop complained how Koahou's behavior and continual practice of polygamy were discouraging the natives of Hilo from converting:

Preached morning and evening at the usual place of worship. The house was filled, and good attention paid in general to the word. But it is to be regretted, that no better example is set, and, in general, no more countenance given to religious things, by Koahou, the principal chief at this place. He still retains three wives, and revels in all the abominations of heathenism, while neither he, or his people, are often at church. Such an example, from a principal chief, has a pernicious effect upon the common people, and accordingly, there are found more open opposers among the natives at this, than at any other station....

Koahou died in 1826, at a place called Punahou, near Hilo. It isn't known whether he left any descendants or what happened to his lands and properties after his death, but they were probably inherited by his sister Peleuli and her descendants.

== Ancestry ==
Ancestors of Koahou

16. Kauakahilau =#16
8. Lonoikahaupu (=#10)
17. Kuluina =#17
4. Keawepoepoe
18. Kaneikaiwilani =#22, 30
9. Kalanikauleleaiwi (=#11, 15)
19. Keakealaniwahine =#23, 31
2. Kamanawa
20. Kauakahilau =#20
10. Lonoikahaupu (=#8)
21. Kuluina =#21
5. Kanoena
22. Kaneikaiwilani =#18, 30
11. Kalanikauleleaiwi (=#9, 15)
23. Keakealaniwahine =#19, 31
1. Koahou
24. Lonohonuakini (=#28)
12. Lonomakaihonua
25. Kalanikauanakinilani (=#29)
6. Kauakahiakua
13. Kahapoohiwi
3. Kekelaokalani
28. Lonohonuakini (=#24)
14. Kaulahea II
29. Kalanikauanakinilani (=#25)
7. Kekuʻiapoiwanui
30. Kaneikaiwilani =#18, 22
15. Kalanikauleleaiwi =#9, 11
31. Keakealaniwahine =#19, 23

== Bibliography ==
- Bishop, Artemas (1827). "Journal of Mr. Bishop, While on a Tour to Hilo". The Missionary Herald: Volume 23. American Board of Commissioners for Foreign Missions. pp. 48–55.
- Fornander, Abraham (1880). Stokes, John F. G. (ed.). An Account of the Polynesian Race: Its Origins and Migrations, and the Ancient History of the Hawaiian People to the Times of Kamehameha I. Vol. 2. Trübner & Co.
- Kamakau, Samuel (1992) [1961]. Ruling Chiefs of Hawaii (Revised ed.). Honolulu: Kamehameha Schools Press. ISBN 0-87336-014-1.
- Kameʻeleihiwa, Lilikalā (1992). Native Land and Foreign Desires. Honolulu: Bishop Museum Press. ISBN 0-930897-59-5.
- Kuykendall, Ralph Simpson (1965) [1938]. The Hawaiian Kingdom 1778–1854, Foundation and Transformation. Vol. 1. Honolulu: University of Hawaii Press. ISBN 0-87022-431-X.
