= Kaukuna Kahekili =

- Died: c. 1840s
- Spouse: Kahakuhaʻakoi Wahinepio
- Issue: Kahalaiʻa Luanuʻu (stepson); Kekauʻōnohi (stepdaughter)
- House: Kekaulike
- Father: Kawelookalani?
- Mother: Peleuli?
- Religion: Christian

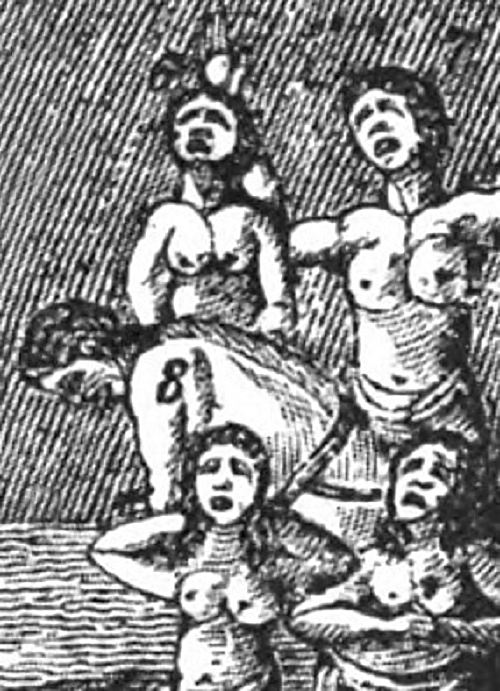
8. Kahekil's brother Kaiko and 6. wife Wahinepio mourning alongside 7. Kalākua Kaheiheimālie and two unidentified women during Queen Keōpūolani's funeral.

Kaukuna Kahekili, often called Kehikili or Kehikiri in earlier sources, was a Hawaiian high chief during the early period of the Kingdom of Hawaii.

His parentage and ancestry are disputed. Most source said he was descended from the Kings of Maui, although it doesn't tell how. While another source claim that not only was he descended from the last king of Maui, probably Kalanikūpule or Kahekili II, but that he had Spanish blood in his vein, citing the legend of a shipwreck Spanish captain and his daughter who married into the aliʻi class. One source says he was the son of Kawelookalani and Peleuli. Peleuli was the daughter of High Chief Kamanawa, one of the royal twin and trusted advisor of Kamehameha I, and his wife Kekelaokalani. Peleuli was a former queen of Kamehameha I. Kawelookalani's was Kamehameha's half-brother and son of High Chief Keōuakupuapāikalani and High Chiefess Kamakaeheukuli.

He had a brother by the name of Kaiko (sometimes written Kakio) who later married Haʻaheo Kaniu, the future foster mother of Kalākaua. They became the punahele of close companions of Kamehameha II. He and his brother had absolutely no power and served no significant governmental post under Queen Kaʻahumanu or King Kamehameha II. Although Kahekili led an army of a thousand men alongside Hoapili and Kaikioʻewa to reinforce Kalanimoku and Kahalaiʻa Luʻuanu in Kauaʻi against Humehume and his rebels in 1824. Placed in charge of small battery in Lahaina under Governor Hoapili, he was noted as a stern warrior with great strength and many battle scars – "a savage in countenance, in form and muscle ... a perfect Hercules" – and was a greatly trusted member of court.

Kahekili was one of the founding members of the House of Nobles in 1841. His name was mentioned in the 1840 Constitution of the Kingdom of Hawaii.

Kahekili married Kahakuhaʻakoi Wahinepio as her fourth husband. They had no known children. He converted to Christianity in the 1820s alongside many of his relatives. He died in the 1840s and willed all his lands to his stepdaughter Kekauʻōnohi.
