= Waiola Church =

Historic church and cemetery in Hawaii, United States

- Waiola Church and Cemetery
- U.S. Historic district – Contributing property
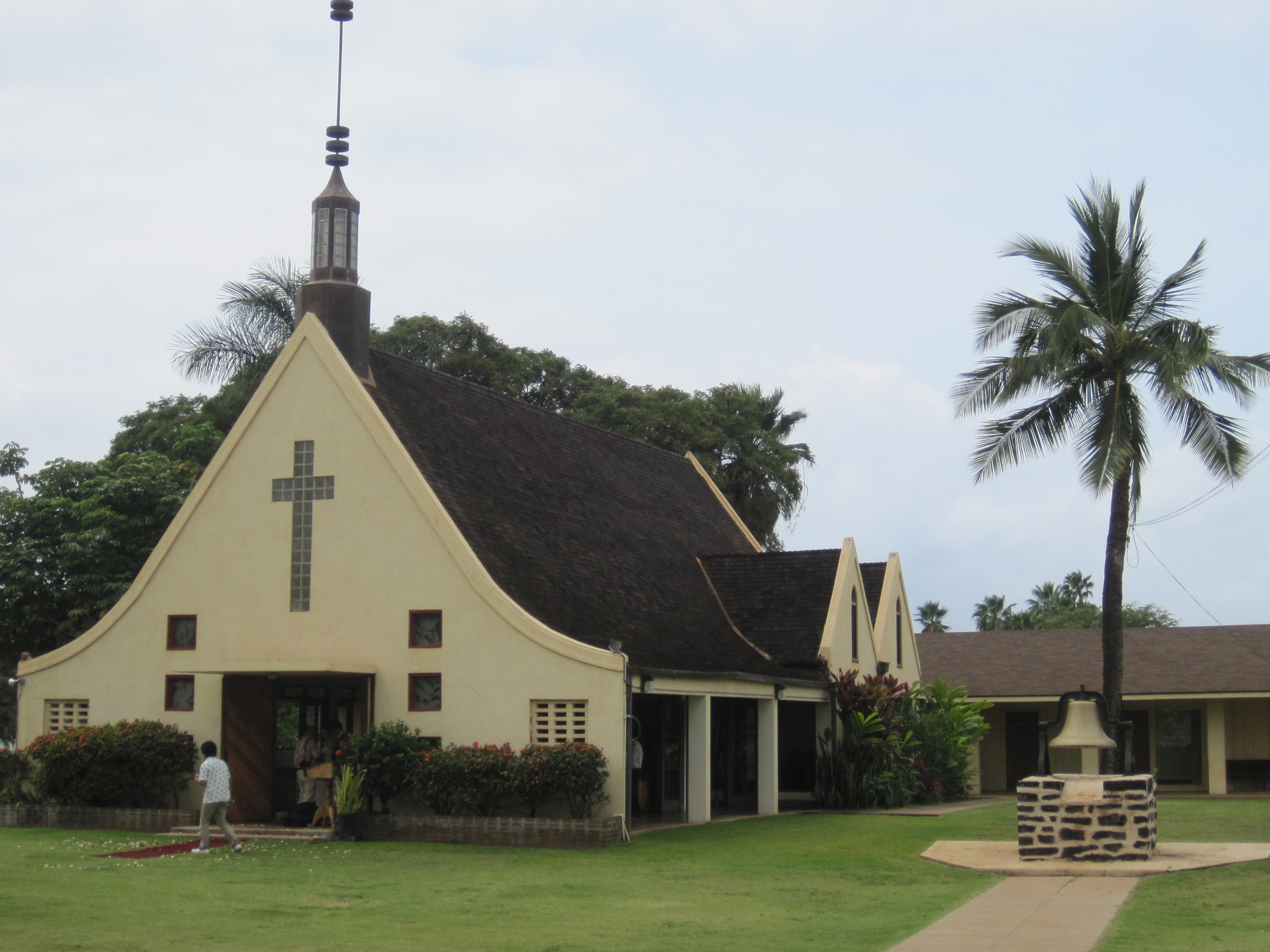
- Waiola Church in 2010

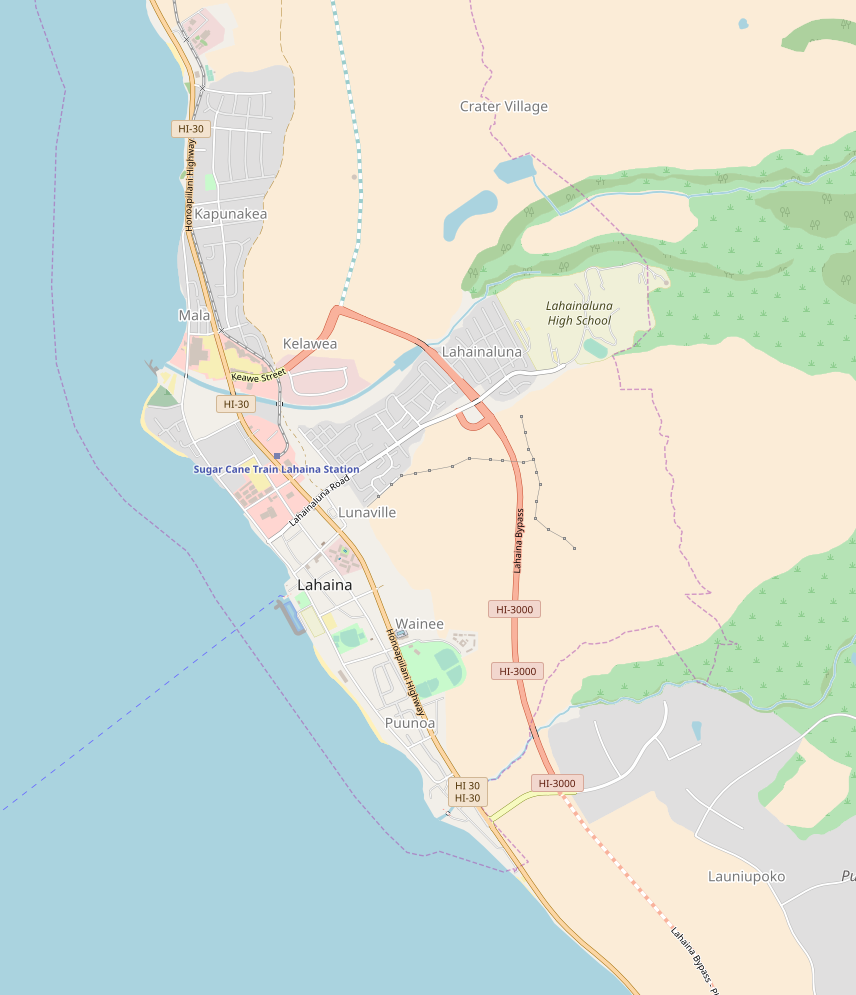
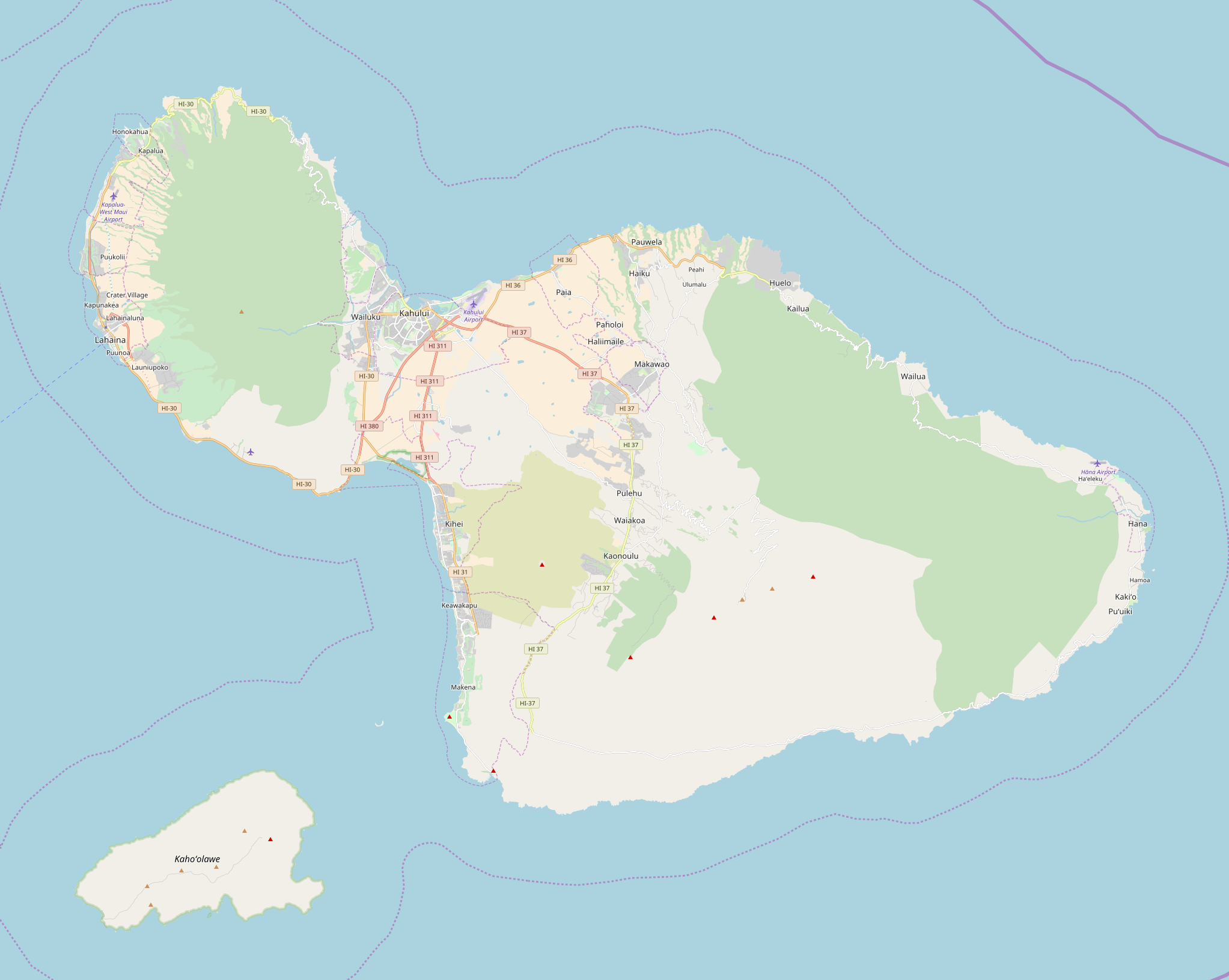
- Location within Lahaina, Hawaii Location within Maui Location within Hawaii
- Location: 535 Waineʻe street Lahaina, Hawaii
- Coordinates: 20°52′10.05″N 156°40′24.12″W
- Area: 2.54 acres (1.03 ha)
- Built: 1832, rebuilt 1954
- Demolished: 1894, 2023
- Part of: Lahaina Historic District (ID66000302)

Waiola Church in Lāhainā is the site of a historic mission established in 1823 on the island of Maui in Hawaiʻi. Originally called Waineʻe Church until 1953, the graveyard, which retains the original name of Waineʻe Cemetery, is the final resting place for aliʻi and early members of the royal family of the Kingdom of Hawaii.

Since first being established, the many iterations of the mission have been susceptible to destruction by wind and fire. One instance took place in 1894, when the church was destroyed by the groundskeeper accidentally losing control of a rubbish fire. It was subsequently rebuilt only to be destroyed twice more and reconstructed. The longest standing church edifice, having been built in 1953, was lost to the 2023 Hawaii wildfires.

== History ==
The first mission to Maui was invited to Lāhainā by Queen Keōpūolani, the most sacred wife of King Kamehameha I and was led by Reverend William Richards (1793–1847) and Reverend Charles Stewart in 1823. For a few years, temporary structures along the beach were used for teaching and service. In 1828, island Governor Hoapili supported the building of a stone and wood structure. The Christian church was built adjacent to a pond, Loko o Mokuhinia, surrounding an island called Mokuʻula, which was sacred to traditional Hawaiian religion and the residence of the king. The first stone building was dedicated on March 4, 1832 and was initially named "Ebenezer" but was more commonly referred to as Waineʻe Church.

Rev. Ephraim Spaulding (1802–1840), joined with his wife Juliet Brooks (1810–1898), ministered at Waiola Church from 1832 to 1836. Rev. Dwight Baldwin transferred here in 1836, and served as physician, even though trained in theology. The Baldwins rebuilt the house of the Spauldings, which was kept in the family until 1967 when it was made into a museum.

Waineʻe (moving water) served as the church for the Hawaiian royal family during the time when Lahaina was the Kingdom's capital, from 1820 through the mid-1840s. Several members of the royal family who were initially buried near Halekamani (where the King Kamehameha III Elementary School was erected in 1913) and on Mokuʻula were reburied in 1884 in the cemetery (the first Christian cemetery in the state). A notable aspect of the cemetery is that the missionaries and Native Hawaiians were buried side by side.

Another building called Hale Halewai (meeting house) was built a few blocks to the northwest around the same time. In 1855, the congregation built a larger building, calling it Aloha Hale (aloha house), completed in 1858. It was built to celebrate how Baldwin had spared the population of Maui from the smallpox epidemic of 1853. In 1859, the royal government added benches and desks, and used it as a school. In 1862, the Episcopal Diocese of Hawaii used it temporarily.

In 1894, a fire destroyed the church. A new one was built from donations by Henry Perrine Baldwin, son of the original Baldwin pastor. In the 1950s, a wind storm knocked down the bell tower of Hale Aloha and damaged the Waineʻe Church. A modern church structure was finished in 1953, when the name was changed to Waiola (living water). The bell from the Hale Aloha tower was salvaged for the new church.

Hale Aloha was remodeled in 1908, but fell into disrepair, and was missing its roof a floor in 1973 when a restoration was begun by the Lahaina Restoration Foundation. The structure was rebuilt by 1985, and stonework by 1992. A bell tower that was built in 1910 was also restored. A new bell was installed in the Hale Aloha tower in 2009. Hale Aloha is located on 600 Luakini Street.

In August 2023, the church building was lost to the 2023 Hawaii wildfires.

== Description ==
The church and Hale Aloha are two contributing properties of the Lahaina Historic District, designated a National Historic Landmark District on December 29, 1962.

The congregation is pastored by licensed minister Kahu Anela Rosa. Normal Sunday services have been suspended during the Lāhainā recovery, but the church has reinstated a first Sunday worship with communion which is held at 10:00 a.m. Services are a mixture of Hawaiian and English language and song. The congregation is affiliated with the Hawaii Conference of the United Church of Christ.

== Burials in the cemetery ==
The tombstones in the cemetery, with death dates:

- Keōpūolani, September 16, 1823
- Kaumualiʻi, May 26, 1824 (1825 on monument)
- Nāhiʻenaʻena, December 30, 1836
- Kuini Liliha, August 25, 1839
- Ulumāheihei Hoapili, also known as Hoapili, January 3, 1840
- Kalākua Kaheiheimālie, also known as Hoapili Wahine, January 16, 1842
- Kekauʻōnohi, granddaughter of Kamehameha I, 2 June 1847
- William Richards, November 7, 1847

== Gallery ==
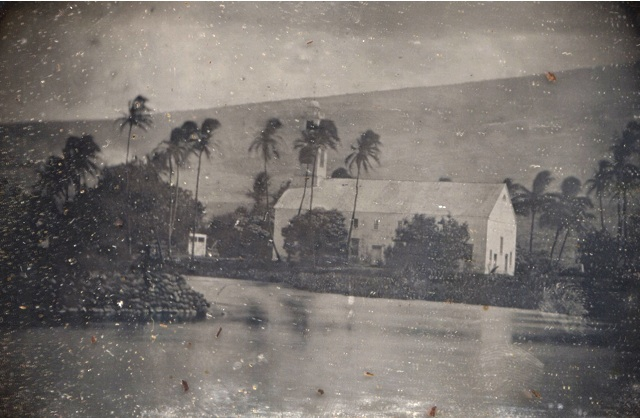
Earliest photograph of Waineʻe Church

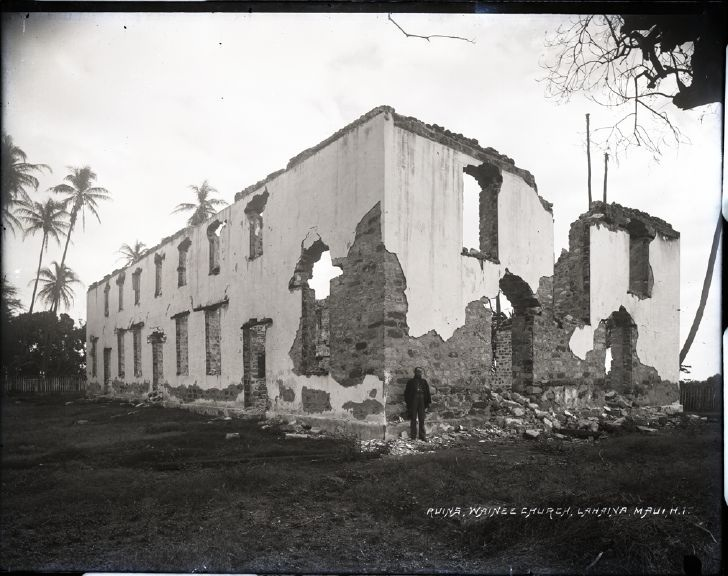
The ruins of Waineʻe Church after the 1894 fire

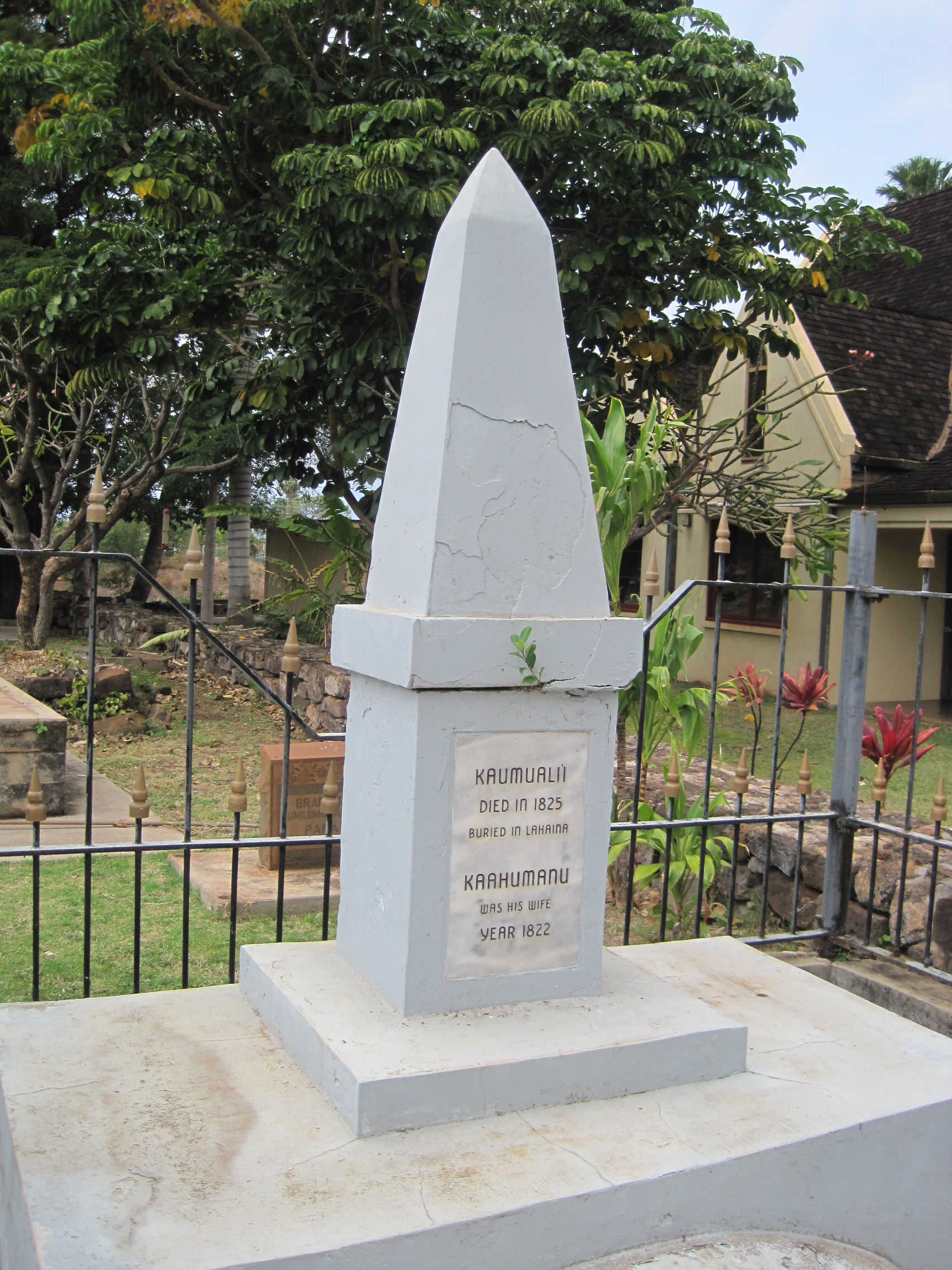
Tombstone for Kaumualiʻi

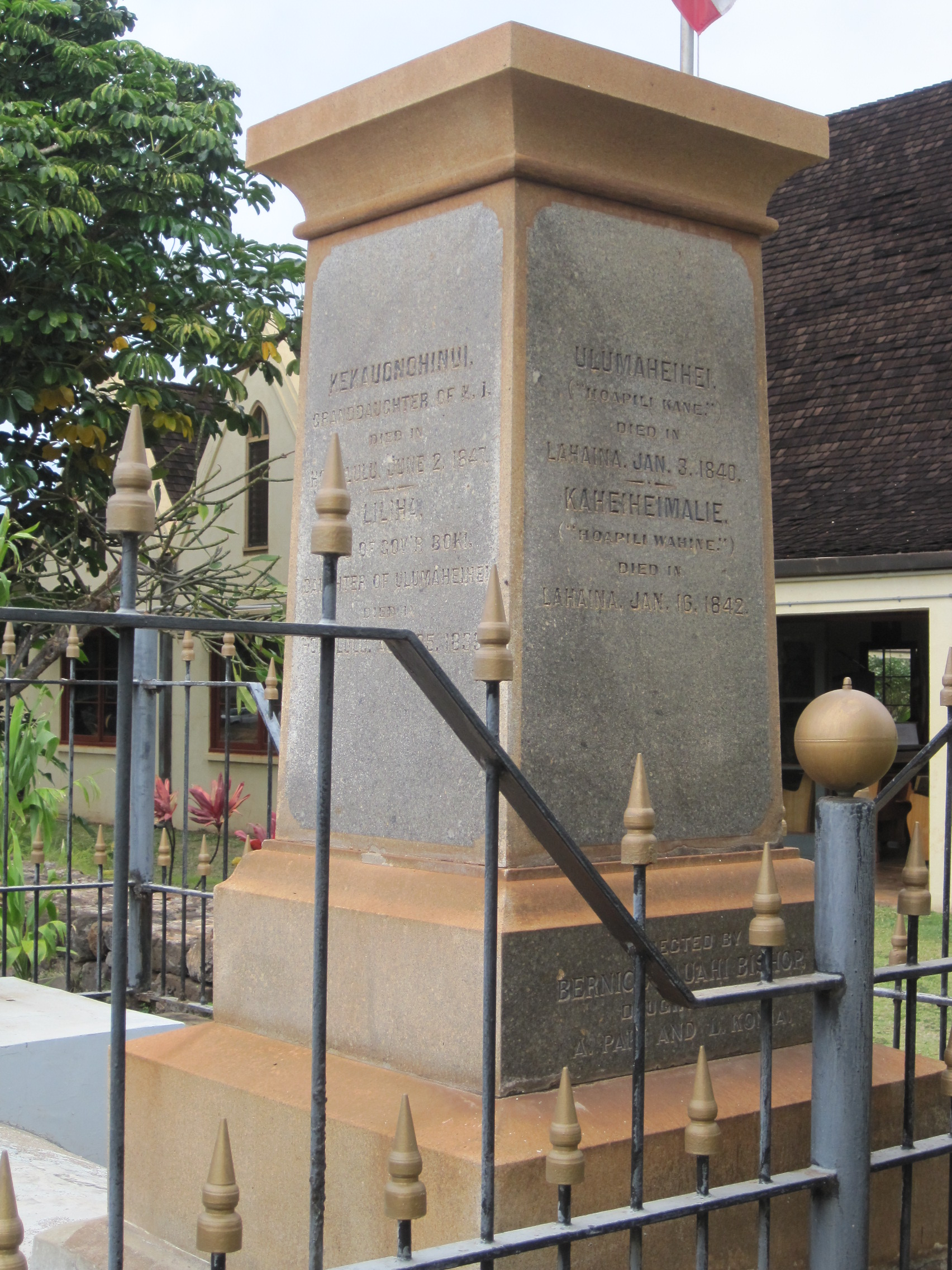
Tombstone for Keōpūolani, Nāhiʻenaʻena, Liliha, Ulumāheihei, Kalākua Kaheiheimālie, Kekauʻōnohi

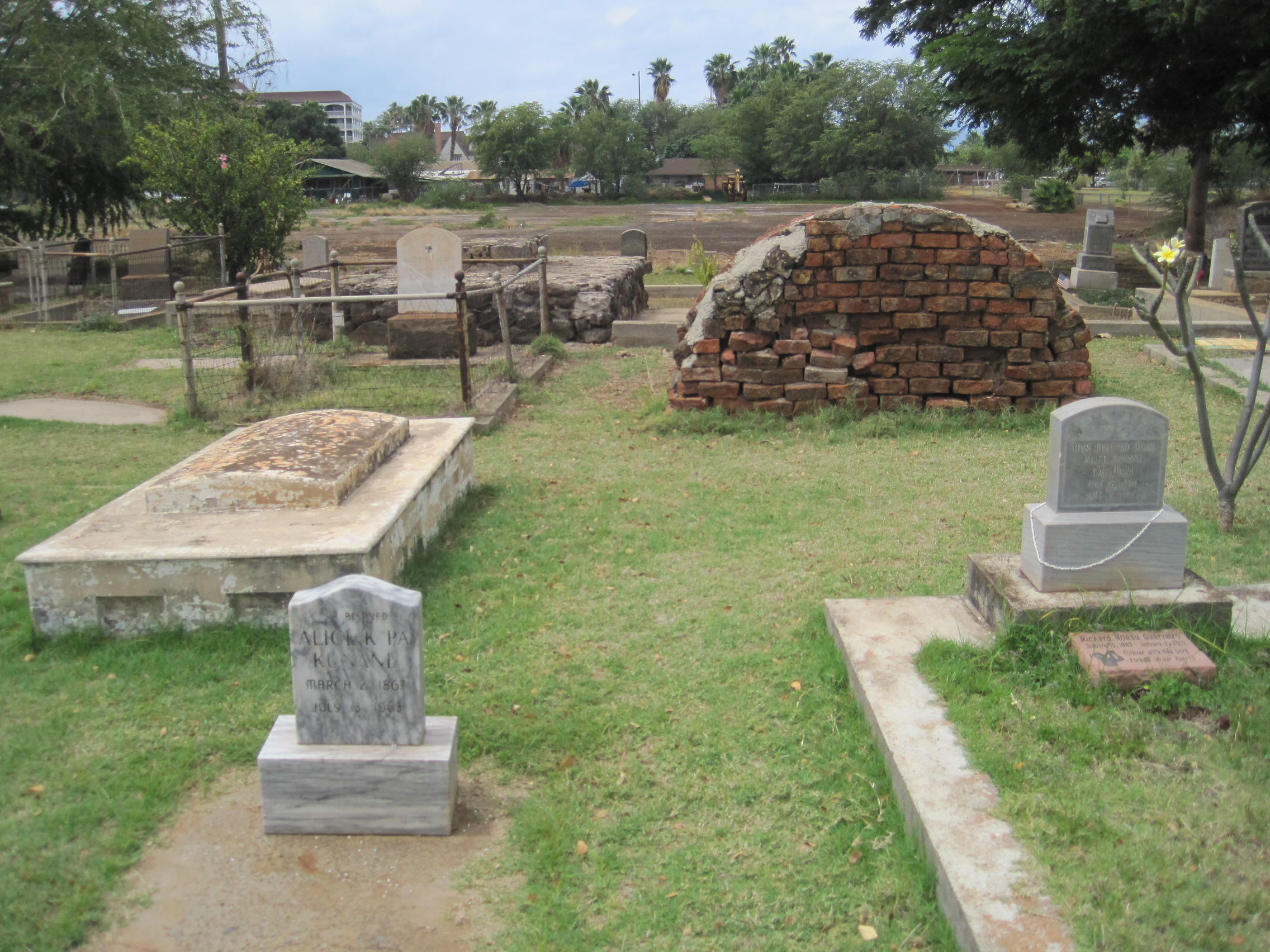
Brick grave marker

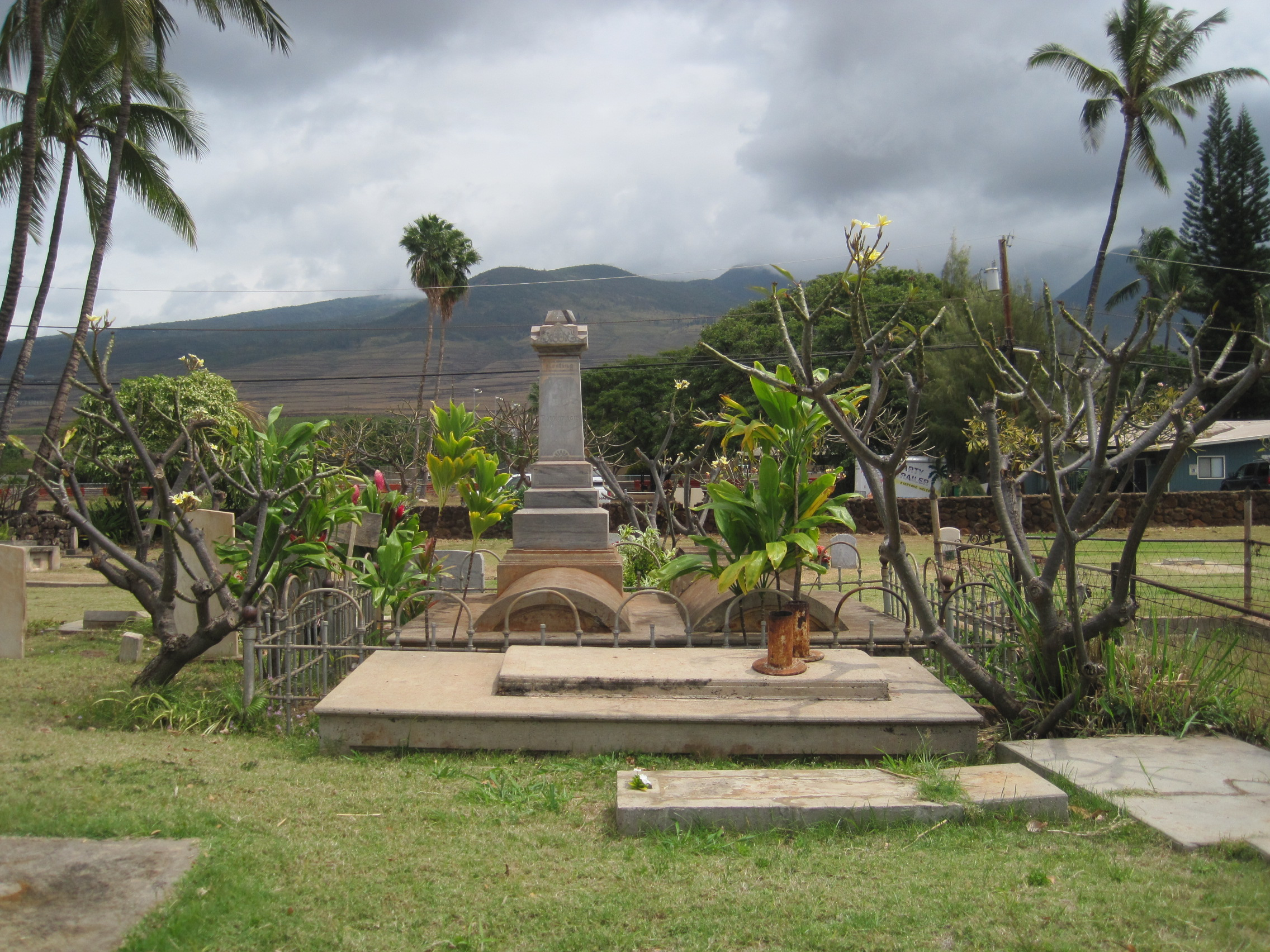
Mountain view from cemetery
