= Leleiohoku I =

Royal Governor of Hawaiʻi (1821–1848)

William Pitt Leleiohoku I
- Royal Governor of Hawaii
- Born: March 31, 1821; Kailua-Kona, Hawaii Island
- Died: October 21, 1848 (aged 27); Honolulu, Oahu
- Burial: December 30, 1848; October 30, 1865; Mauna ʻAla Royal Mausoleum
- Spouse: Nāhiʻenaʻena; Keʻelikōlani
- Issue: John William Pitt Kīnaʻu
- Father: Kalanimoku
- Mother: Kiliwehi

William Pitt Leleiohoku I (March 31, 1821 – October 21, 1848) was a Hawaiian noble during the Kingdom of Hawaii who married two notable princesses and served as Royal Governor of Hawaii island.

Leleiohoku was born on March 31, 1821, in Kailua-Kona, Hawaii. He was the son of the Prime Minister Kalanimoku who was called The Iron Pillar of Hawaii and took the English name of William Pitt after British Prime Minister William Pitt the Younger. His mother was Kiliwehi, the daughter of King Kamehameha I and Peleuli. She named him in honor of the date of death of Kamehameha on the Hawaiian calendar, on the night of Hoku, Kaelo (May 14); Leleiohoku means "Fled in the time of Hoku" in the Hawaiian language. Other accounts give his mother as Kuwahine, who was another wife of Kalanimoku and a daughter of Governor Kaikioʻewa of Kauai and Piʻipiʻi Kalanikaulihiwakama, Kamehameha I's half-sister. He was considered of the highest hereditary descent after the king. He was hānai (adopted) by John Adams Kuakini, who was Governor of Hawaii Island and brother of the powerful Queen Kaʻahumanu. He attended Lahainaluna Seminary ran by the American missionaries and converted to Christianity.

He was married on November 25, 1835, to the Princess Nāhiʻenaʻena when he was only 14; the princess was 6 years his senior. The marriage had been arranged by the missionaries to halt a sibling marriage between King Kamehameha III and Nāhiʻenaʻena. Their Christian wedding was held in Waineʻe Church. It was not a happy union. He inherited little of his father's land because Kalanimoku, shortly before his death, made a verbal will leaving his entire property to his niece Kekauʻōnohi, the previous queen of King Kamehameha II. Kekauʻōnohi, although only a cousin of Leleiohoku, was regarded according to ancient Hawaiian customs as his sister. It appears that Kalanimoku made a verbal disposition of his property to her (who was older than Leleiohoku) and willed that he should be the kanaka living under her.

Nāhiʻenaʻena became ill after a failed pregnancy and died in 1836 at age 21. The child was said to be his but probably could have been Kauikeaouli's. Leleiohoku married a second time to Princess Ruth Keʻelikōlani, who was daughter of Kalani Pauahi and Kekūanaōʻa. He had a son John William Pitt Kīnaʻu from his second wife. He served as an original member of the House of Nobles in 1841–1846, and on the Kings Privy Council from 1845 to 1846. His foster father Kuakini died in 1844 and he inherited the governorship of the Big Island. He inherited the Huliheʻe Palace which he passed to his wife. He died on October 21, in the measles epidemic of 1848, at Kekauʻōnohi's house, aged 27. The funeral services for Leleiohoku, Moses Kekūāiwa, and Kaiminaauao were held on December 30, 1848; they were interred in the Royal Cemetery.

His widow lived on and inherited her husband's properties after their son died at age 17. Keelikolani showed her love for him when she named her hānai son Leleiohoku II, after her deceased husband Leleiohoku. He was buried on the grounds of the current Iolani Palace and later remove to the Mauna ʻAla Royal Mausoleum.

Preceded by John Adams Kuakini	Royal Governor of Hawaiʻi Island; 1844–1846	Succeeded by George Luther Kapeau
