= Kuakini =

Hawaiian noble (1789–1844)

John Adams Kuakini
- Royal Governor of Hawaiʻi Island and Oʻahu
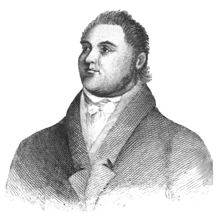
- An 1822 sketch by William Ellis
- Born: c. 1789
- Died: December 9, 1844; Kailua-Kona
- Spouse: High Chiefess Keoua; High Chiefess Haʻaheo
- Issue: High Chief Keoua; High Chiefess Kamānele
Names
- Kaluaikonahale
- Father: Keʻeaumoku Pāpaiahiahi
- Mother: NāmāhānaʻiʻKaleleokalani

John Adams Kiʻiapalaoku Kuakini (1789–1844) was an important adviser to Kamehameha I in the early stages of the Kingdom of Hawaii. He was responsible for contributing to the infrastructure among other changes in the Kona District during this era.

== Family life ==
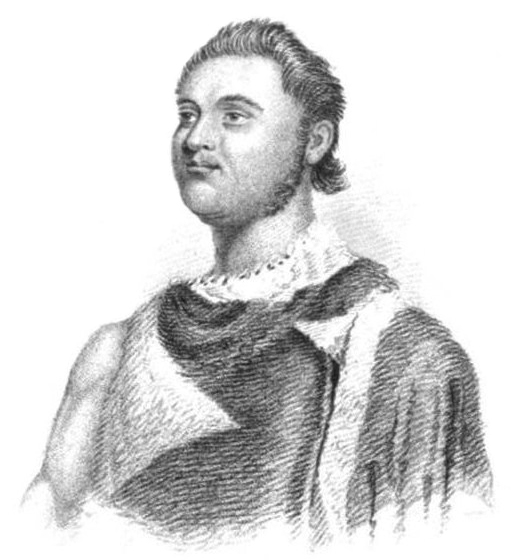
Sketch of Kuakini wearing his ʻahuʻula signifying Hawaiian nobility.

He was born about 1789 with the name Kaluaikonahale. His father was Keʻeaumoku Pāpaiahiahi, an aliʻi (noble) from the island of Hawaiʻi, and his mother was NāmāhānaʻiʻKaleleokalani, the widow queen and half-sister of the late king of Maui, Kamehameha Nui. Historian Samuel Kamakau later makes the contradictory claim that Kaʻiana was Kuakini's father and also claimed he was a poʻolua child (possessing two head or father).

Keʻeaumoku became a fugitive from King Kahekili II of Maui. Escaping to Hana, the family moved back to Hawaiʻi island and lived on Kahaluʻu Bay. He was the youngest of four important siblings: sisters Queen Kaʻahumanu, Kamehameha's favorite wife and later became the powerful Kuhina nui, Kalākua Kaheiheimālie and Namahana-o-Piʻia, also queens of Kamehameha, and brother George Cox Kahekili Keʻeaumoku, who later became the Governor of Maui. His father helped Kamehameha I come to power in the battle of Mokuʻōhai in 1782.

With the introduction of Christianity, Hawaiians were encouraged to take British or American names. As an example of his royal manner, he chose the name John Adams after John Quincy Adams, the U.S. president in office at the time. He adopted the name as well as other customs of the U.S. and Europe.

As a youth he excelled at sports such as canoeing, but later acquired a taste for alcohol, fine food, and women. He seriously injured his foot, however, trying to escape after being caught with the wife of Governor Kuihelani of Oahu. He recovered, but walked with a limp for the rest of his life. Like many of Polynesian royal lineage, he had a large stature. A visitor in 1819 described him as about 6 feet 3 inches, and in his later days was said to have weighed over 400 pounds.

He married Keouawahine and Kaniuʻopiohaʻaheo or Haʻaheo. With Keouawahine, he had one son Keoua, who died in infancy, and with Haʻaheo, he had one daughter Mele Kaʻauʻamoku o Kamānele (1814–1834). Kamānele was considered to be a potential bride for King Kamehameha III, but she died young. The king later married Kalama, the daughter of ship pilot Naihekukui.

== Royal Governor ==
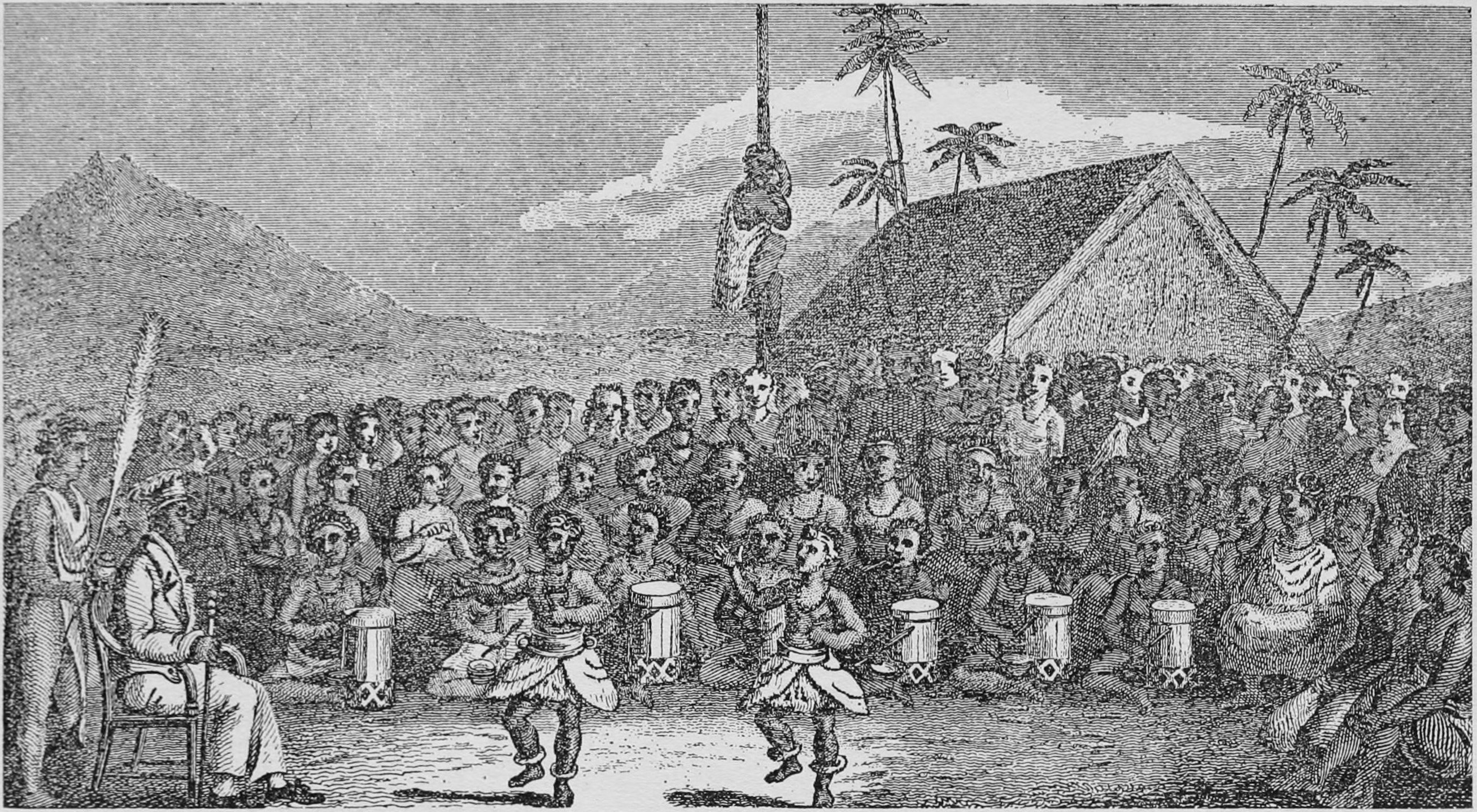
Sketch from William Ellis of Kuakini welcoming visitors with a Hula dance ceremony

When the Kingdom's central government moved to Lahaina in 1820, his influence expanded on Hawaiʻi island. After John Young had effectively but unofficially served in the role, Kuakini was appointed the first recorded Royal Governor of Hawaiʻi island, serving from 1820 until his death. However, on April 1, 1831, a potential rebellion was uncovered on the island of Oʻahu. His sister Queen Regent Kaʻahumanu appointed him Royal Governor of Oʻahu after Kuini Liliha, the leader of the rebellion, he resided at Fort Honolulu serving as the Commander in Chief. Some time in the next few years he moved back to the island of Hawaiʻi after Kaʻahumanu died and Elizabeth Kīnaʻu became Queen Regent, calling herself Kaʻahumanu II. From 1841 through 1843 he served in the House of Nobles.

He gave land to missionaries, such as Asa Thurston to build Mokuʻaikaua Church, and others on the island. He extended a series of low walls that were originally used as Ahupuaʻa (traditional land division) barriers for pigs, because the cattle left behind by George Vancouver were wandering through the village of Kailua. This work became known as Ka pā nui o Kuakini ("The Great Wall of Kuakini"), some of which still stands today.

In the village he built Huliheʻe Palace in the American style out of native lava, coral lime mortar, koa and ʻohiʻa timbers. Completed in 1838, he used the palace to entertain visiting Americans and Europeans with great feasts. He made official visits to all ships that arrived on the island, offering them tours of sites such as the Kīlauea volcano.

Kuakini died December 9, 1844, in Kailua-Kona. He left Huliheʻe Palace to his hānai (adopted son) William Pitt Leleiohoku I, who left it to his wife Princess Ruth Keʻelikōlani.

== Legacy ==
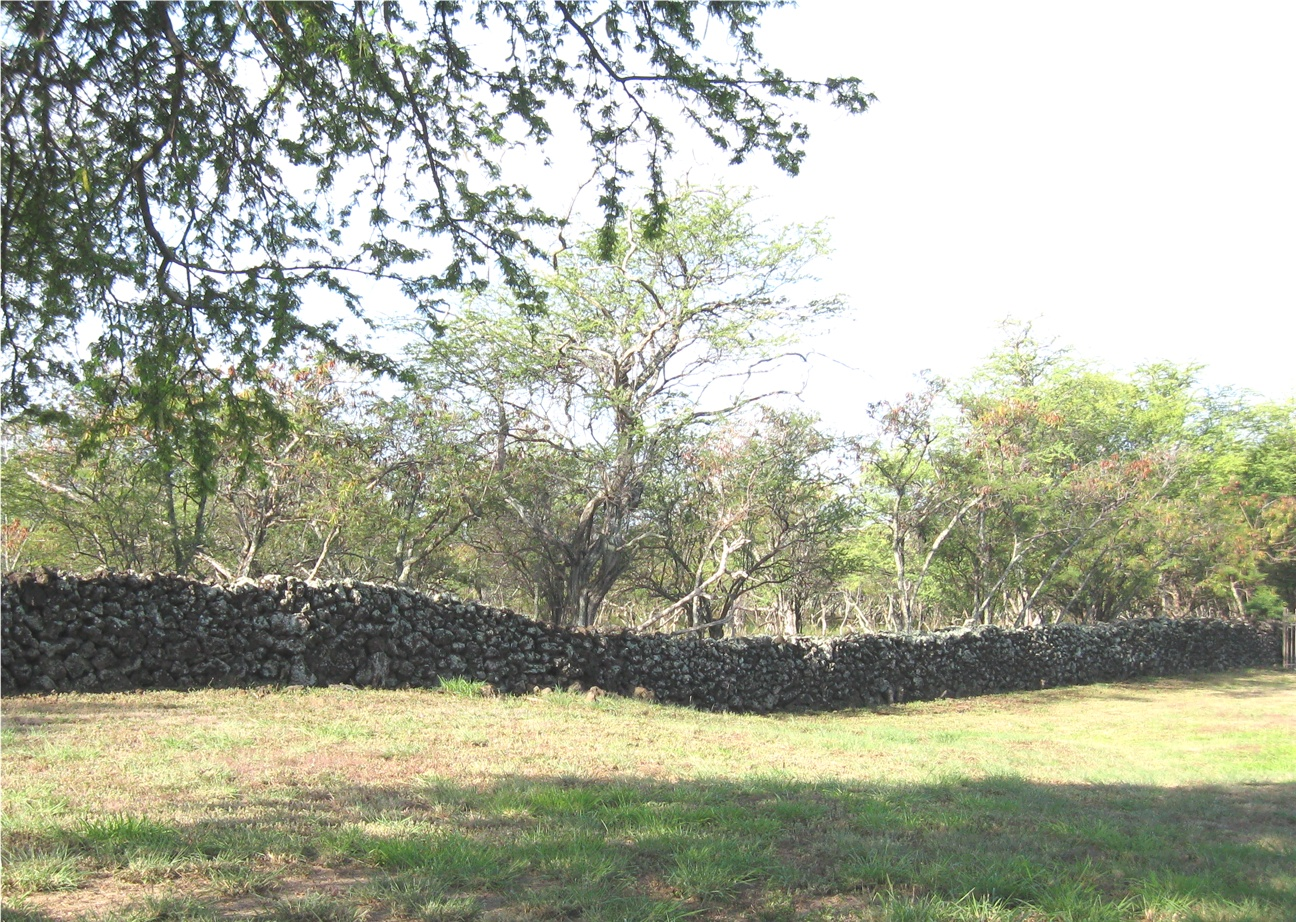
Portions of the Great Wall still exist around Kailua-Kona

Huliheʻe Palace is now a museum run by the Daughters of Hawaiʻi, including some of his artifacts. A highway is named "Kuakini Highway", which runs from the Hawaii Belt Road through the town of Kailua-Kona, to the Old Kona Airport State Recreation Area. He is also the namesake of Kuakini Street, Honolulu, which is in turn the namesake of the Kuakini Medical Center on it.

== Ancestry ==
Ancestors of Kuakini

16. Kauakahilau
8. Lonoikahaupu
17. Kuluina
4. Keawepoepoe
18. Kaneikauaiwilani
9. Kalanikauleleiaiwi (= 29)
19. Keakealaniwahine
2. Keʻeaumoku Pāpaʻiahiahi
5. Kūmaʻaikū
1. Kuakini
24. Lonohonuakini
12. Kaulahea II
25. Kalanikauanakinilani
6. Kekaulike
26. ʻUmi-a-Liloa of Maui
13. Papaikaniau
27. Kuʻihewamakawalu
3. NāmāhānaʻiʻKaleleokalani
28. Kauaua-a-Mahi
14. Haʻae-a-Mahi
29. Kalanikauleleiaiwi (= 9)
7. Haʻaloʻu
30. Kaulahea II (= 12)
15. Kalelemauliokalani
31. Papaikaniau (= 13)

Preceded by John Young?	Royal Governor of Hawaiʻi Island; 1820 - 1831	Succeeded by Naihe
Preceded by Kuini Liliha	Royal Governor of Oʻahu; 1831 - 1832	Succeeded by Kīnaʻu
Preceded by Naihe	Royal Governor of Hawaiʻi Island; 1832 - 1844	Succeeded by William Pitt Leleiohoku I
