= Hoapili =

Member of the nobility during the Kingdom of Hawaiʻi (c. 1775–1840)

Ulumāheihei Hoapili
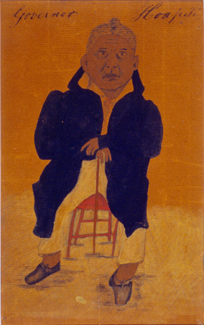
- Hoapili, watercolor by Clarissa Chapman Armstrong
- Born: c. 1775
- Died: January 3, 1840 (aged 64); Lahaina, Maui
- Burial: Waiola Church
- Spouse: Kalilikauoha; Keōpūolani; Kalākua Kaheiheimālie
- Issue: Kuini Liliha (hānai)? Nāhiʻenaʻena (step); Kekāuluohi (step); Lot Kapuāiwa (hānai)
- Father: Kameʻeiamoku
- Mother: Kealiʻiokahekili

Ulumāheihei Hoapili (c. 1775 – January 3, 1840) was a member of the nobility during the formation of the Kingdom of Hawaii. He was a military and political advisor to Kamehameha I. Although trusted with one of the last symbolic rites of the Hawaiian religion, he later became a supporter of Christian missionaries.

== Life ==
Ulumāheihei (his original name) was born around 1775, during the reign of King Kalaniʻōpuʻu. His father was High Chief Kameʻeiamoku, known as one of the "royal twins" who helped Kamehameha I come to power. After his father's death, he inherited his father's counselor position in Kamehameha's court. In his youth he was athletic, standing about 6.5 feet (2.0 m) tall. A story was told of how he once wrestled down an attacking bull by its horns. A few years after the 1795 battle of Nuʻuanu when Kamehameha conquered Oʻahu and Maui, Hoapili was left in charge of the island of Oʻahu and the royal court settled at Kamakahonu in present-day Kailua-Kona. His first marriage was to Chiefess Kalilikauoha (daughter of King Kahekili II of Maui island). From her his daughter Kuini Liliha was born in 1802 or 1803, about the same time his father Kameʻeiamoku died. Other sources give Liliha as an adoptive daughter in the ancient Hawaiian tradition of hānai. He would definitely later become a respected foster parent for royal children. In 1810 the King of the island of Kauaʻi agreed to become a vassal, and Kamehameha had united all the Hawaiian islands.

By 1815, Kamehameha had established succession with two sons, and entrusted Ulumāheihei with the care of their mother, Queen Keōpūolani, Kamehameha's wife with the best royal family background. This made Hoapili stepfather to Princess Nāhiʻenaʻena. He became known as hoa pili which means "close personal friend" in the Hawaiian language because of his trusted relationship with Kamehameha. A saying of the time was O Ulu-maheihei wale no, ia ia oloko, ia ia owaho, meaning roughly "Ulumāheihei knows everything inside and out".

Hoapili was with Kamehameha when he died on May 8, 1819, at Kamakahonu. The dying king whispered his last wishes into Hoapili's ear. He and his half-brother Hoʻolulu were selected to hide the bones of Kamehameha in a secret place, according to ancient rituals. To add to the secrecy, they waited for a night of a new moon. Theories are a cave was found along the shore that was covered at high tides, in the area known as Kaloko. This would be the last monarch of Hawaii to have all the traditional funeral rites of the Hawaiian religion.

When his nephew Keaoua Kekuaokalani organized an uprising, Hoapili was sent with chief orator Naihe to negotiate a peaceful settlement. Kekuaokalani refused, so Hoapii and military leader Kalanimoku led Kingdom troops to the battle of Kuamoʻo where the rebels were routed. Hoapili also led troops to suppress another brief uprising in the northern part of the island near Waimea.

In 1820 the first company of Christian missionaries arrived in Hawaii. Although Kamehameha II was officially King, real power was held by Hoapili's half-cousin Queen Kaʻahumanu, who welcomed them. On April 11, 1822, some translators from Tahiti arrived with English missionary William Ellis. The Hawaiian language was close enough to Tahitian that the pace of education improved. In February 1823, Keōpūolani renounced the practice of multiple spouses for royalty, and made Hoapili her only husband. Previously she had been "shared" with another former Kamehameha military leader, Kalanimōkū. On April 23, 1823, William Richards and Charles Stewart arrived in the second company of missionaries and taught reading and writing to the royal court using the newly devised writing system for the Hawaiian language.

In May 1823 he and Keōpūolani moved to Lahaina on the island of Maui, and asked for books and a chaplain so they could continue their studies. Hoapili served as Royal Governor of Maui from May 1823. Keōpūolani died September 16, 1823, after being a baptism by Ellis. Her funeral was a mix of Hawaiian and Christian traditions.

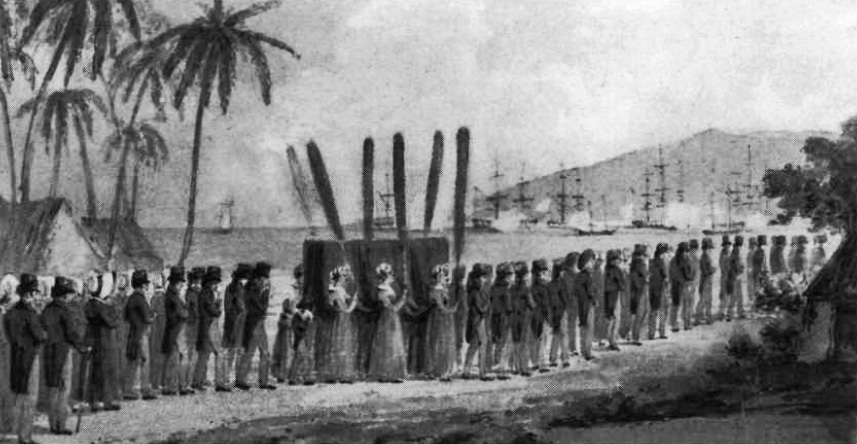
Sketch by Ellis of Keōpūolani's 1823 funeral

On October 19, 1823, Hoapili married Kalākua Kaheiheimālie (c. 1780–1842) who became known as "Hoapili-wahine", roughly meaning "Mrs. Hoapili". It was one of the first Christian wedding ceremony for Hawaiian nobility. Hoapili would then often be known as "Hoapili-kane" ("Mr. Hoapili") to distinguish the two. This made him stepfather to Kekāuluohi, who was Queen Consort of two kings and mother of another. They adopted and helped raise Prince Lot Kapuāiwa (Kalākua's grandson, who would later come to the throne as King Kamehameha V) in the Hawaiian tradition known as hānai.

In August 1824, Hoapili led troops from Maui to suppress an uprising by "George Prince" Kaumualiʻi on Kauaʻi. During the 1820s, Lahaina became a popular port for whaling ships. This led to conflicts between the sailors who liked to enjoy their time ashore with grog and women, and the conservative missionaries. Hoapili ordered cannon to defend the town after an irate captain of the English whaler John Palmer had opened fire on the mission station.

By 1826, he ruled that all marriages on Maui should follow the Christian tradition. After the thatched house used as a church blew down, in 1828 he ordered the first stone church to be built adjacent to Mokuʻula which was a royal residence and burial site on a small island within a sacred pond.

His daughter Kuini Liliha married High Chief Boki, and inherited Boki's position of Royal Governor of Oʻahu after Boki's disappearance at sea in 1829. Liliha was suspected of organizing a rebellion in 1830, and Hoapili was sent to peacefully relieve her of her duties. In 1831 he donated land to be used for the Lanhainaluna seminary founded by Lorrin Andrews. This school would produce some of the important historians of the time, such as Samuel Kamakau and David Malo. Hoapili was consulted as an expert in astronomy and ancient Hawaiian mythology for the first book published on Hawaiian history. Hoapili selected a promising assistant to become educated as a teacher for Hawaiʻi island.

As more companies of missionaries arrived, Hoapili awarded them additional grants of land, sometimes to the consternation of the people who lived there. Dwight Baldwin arrived in 1836, and would help Hoapili deal with the health problems of alcoholism and epidemic diseases carried on the whaling ships. Hoapili died January 3, 1840, and was buried at Waiola Church cemetery, then known as "Waineʻe Church".

== Legacy ==
The girls' dormitory at Lahainaluna High School (at the site of the Lanhainaluna seminary) was named for him. The area where he lived on Oʻahu was given to his daughter Liliha and son-in-law Boki. It was then donated to the mission and became home of the Punahou School in 1841. Historian Sheldon Dibble called Hoapili "a meek and quiet disciple of Jesus and a firm supporter of the Christian Religion".

Preceded by Kahakuhaʻakoi Wahinepio	Royal Governor of Maui; 1823–1840	Succeeded by Kalākua Kaheiheimālie
