= Manono II =

Hawaiian chiefess, royal, and rebel (d. 1819)

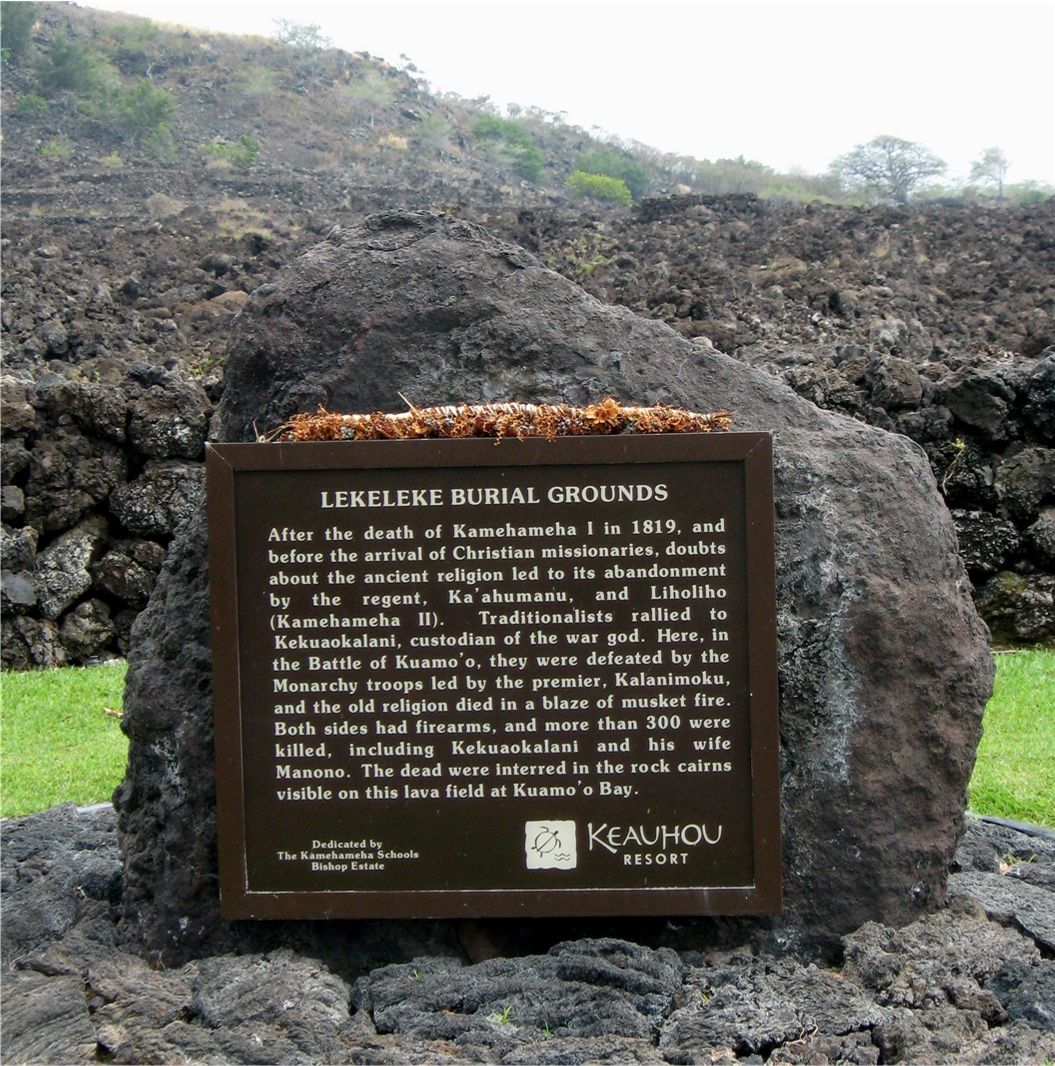
- Memorial at Kuamoʻo
- Died: December 1819; Kuamoʻo
- Spouse: Kamehameha I Keaoua Kekuaokalani
- Father: Kekuamanoha
- Mother: Kalolaʻakumukoʻa
- Religion: Hawaiian religion

Manono II (died 1819) was a Hawaiian chiefess and member of the royal family during the Kingdom of Hawaii. She along with her second husband Keaoua Kekuaokalani died fighting for the Hawaiian religion after Kamehameha II abolished the kapu system.

== Biography ==
Manono's father was Kekuamanoha, and her mother was Kalola-a-Kumukoʻa, the wife of Kamehameha before his victory at the Battle of Mokuʻōhai. Through her father she was a granddaughter of Kekaulike, the King or Moʻi of Maui. From her mother's side, she was the great-granddaughter of King Keaweʻīkekahialiʻiokamoku of Hawaiʻi. Her half-siblings from her father's first marriage were Kalanimoku, Boki, and Wahinepio. She was the cousin of Kaʻahumanu, Kalākua Kaheiheimālie, and Namahana Piʻia, Kuakini, Governor of Hawaiʻi; and Keʻeaumoku II.

Around 1809, while still in her youth, Manono was chosen along with her cousin Kekāuluohi by Kamehameha I "to warm his old age" thus becoming the old king's last two wives. The two young chiefesses were deemed his wahine pālama, a term that denote their special status and rank which required them to live in a sacred enclosure of lama wood. "Lama" was the Hawaiian name for endemic ebony trees of genus Diospyros sandwicensis that were used in religious ceremonies. Oral tradition attested that Kamehameha's last child, a daughter named Kapapauai, was born from one of his wahine pālama, either Manono's or Kekāuluohi's. She would later marry High Chief Keaoua Kekuaokalani, a nephew of the Kamehameha I. Kekuaokalani's maternal grandmother was her namesake Manono I, a daughter of Alapainui and Kamakaimoku. Kekuaokalani inherited the guardianship of the Hawaiian god of war, Kūkaʻilimoku after Kamehameha's death.

After Kamehameha I's death, on May 8, 1819, Liholiho succeeded as King Kamehameha II. Influenced by powerful female chiefs such as Kaʻahumanu and his mother Keōpūolani, the young king abolished the kapu system that had governed life Hawaiian society for centuries. Henceforth, men and women could eat together, women could eat formerly forbidden foods, and official worship at the stone platform temples, or heiaus, was discontinued. This event is called the ʻAi Noa, or free eating. In response to Liholiho's actions, Kekuaokalani put himself forward as the defender of the kapu system and old religion, amassing a formidable force in the village of Kaʻawaloa. All attempts of reconciliation failed between the two royal cousins and war broke out between Kekuaokalani and the royal forces led by Manono's half-brother Kalanimoku. Fighting alongside her husband in the Battle of Kuamoʻo, they both perished in defense of the kapu system.

Visiting Kuamoʻo a few years afterward, British missionary William Ellis of the London Missionary Society chronicled the native accounts of the battle and the death of Kekuaokalani and Manono on Ellis' tour of the island of Hawaii:

The small tumuli increased in number as we passed along, until we came to a place called Tuamoo. Here Kekuaokalani made his last stand, rallied his flying forces, and seemed, for a moment, to turn the scale of victory; but being weak with the loss of blood, from a wound he had received in the early part of the engagement, he fainted and fell. However, he soon revived, and, though unable to stand, sat on a fragment of lava, and twice loaded and fired his musket on the advancing party. He now received a ball in his left breast, and immediately covering his face with his feather cloak, expired in the midst of his friends. His wife Manono during the whole of the day fought by his side with steady and dauntless courage. A few moments after her husband's death, perceiving Karaimoku and his sister advancing, she called out for quarter; but the words had hardly escaped from her lips, when she received a ball in her left temple, fell upon the lifeless body of her husband, and instantly expired. The idolaters having lost their chief, made but feeble resistance afterwards; yet the combat, which commenced in the forenoon, continued till near sunset, when the king's troops, finding their enemies had all either fled or surrendered, returned to Kairua.

== Bibliography ==
- Bingham, Hiram (1855) [1848]. A Residence of Twenty-one Years in the Sandwich Islands (Third ed.). H.D. Goodwin.
- Dibble, Sheldon (1843). A History of the Sandwich Islands. Lahainaluna: Press of the Mission Seminary.
- Ellis, William (1827). Narrative of a Tour through Hawaii (2 ed.). London: H. Fisher, son, and P. Jackson.
- Fornander, Abraham (1880). Stokes, John F. G. (ed.). An Account of the Polynesian Race: Its Origins and Migrations, and the Ancient History of the Hawaiian People to the Times of Kamehameha I. Vol. 2. Trübner & Co.
- Kalākaua, David (1888). Daggett, Rollin Mallory (ed.). The Legends and Myths of Hawaii: The Fables and Folk-lore of a Strange People. New York: C. L. Webster & Company.
- Kamakau, Samuel (1992) [1961]. Ruling Chiefs of Hawaii (Revised ed.). Honolulu: Kamehameha Schools Press. ISBN 0-87336-014-1.
- Kuykendall, Ralph Simpson (1965) [1938]. The Hawaiian Kingdom 1778–1854, Foundation and Transformation. Vol. 1. Honolulu: University of Hawaii Press. ISBN 0-87022-431-X.
- Pratt, Elizabeth Kekaaniauokalani Kalaninuiohilaukapu (2009) [1920]. Daniel Logan (ed.). History of Keoua Kalanikupuapa-i-nui: Father of Hawaii Kings, and His Descendants. Honolulu: republished by Kessinger Publishing. ISBN 978-1-104-76661-0.
- Thrum, Thomas G. (1916). "Was There A Lost Son of Kamehameha?". Hawaiian Journal of History. Hawaiian Historical Society: 44–51. hdl:10524/96.
