= Manono =

Manono may refer to:

- Manono Island, Samoa
- Manono, Democratic Republic of the Congo (Tanganyika Province)
- Manono, the Māori name given to plants of the Coprosma species Coprosma grandifolia, found in New Zealand
- Manono, the Hawaiian name given to various species of plants in the family Rubiaceae, at different times in recent years officially classified as being in the genera Hedyotis, Kadua, or Gouldia
- Manono I
- Manono II
