= Kamakaʻīmoku =

Chiefess in ancient Hawaii

- Spouse: Kalaninuiamamao; Kalanikeʻeaumoku; Alapaʻinui
- Issue: Kalaniʻōpuʻu; Keōua; Manono I
- House: House of Keawe
- Father: Kū-a-Nuʻuanu
- Mother: ʻUmiʻula-a-kaʻahumanu

Kamakaʻīmoku was a chiefess in ancient Hawaii in the early 18th century. She married three powerful men of the time, was mother of the King who would unite the island of Hawaiʻi and meet the first known visitors from Europe, and grandmother of the founder of the Kingdom that united all of the Hawaiian Islands.

== Biography ==
The mother of Kamakaʻīmoku was the High Chiefess Umiula-a-kaʻahumanu, a daughter of Chief Mahiolole (Mahi) of the Kohala district, and Chiefess Kanekukaailani, who was a daughter of ʻĪ of the Hilo district and Akahikameenoa; consequently she was a cousin to Chief Alapaʻi Nui, and a chiefess of the highest rank.

Her father was Chief Kū-a-Nuʻuanau, of Oʻahu island, son of High Chief Nuʻuanu, third son of ʻI of Hilo and ʻAkahikameʻenoa. She was related to King ʻUmi of Hawaiʻi island royalty from several islands. She was raised on Oʻahu, while her mother went back to Hawaiʻi island and married Kapahi-a-ʻAhu-Kāne (Kapahi-a-Ahu), the son of ʻAhu-a-ʻĪ. Both her grandmother Kānekūkaʻailani, her grandfather Nuʻuanu, and her stepfather Kapahi-a-ʻAhu were children of High Chief ʻĪ of Hilo.

Kamakaʻīmoku's name translates as the "Eye of Islands". When grown up, Kamakaʻīmoku was seen by Kalaninuiamamao on his visit to Oʻahu, and sent for to be his wife. Living with him at the court of his father Keaweʻīkekahialiʻiokamoku, she had his son, Kalaniʻōpuʻu, who afterwards became the ruler of most of Hawaiʻi island. Kalaniʻōpuʻuʻu would also be the king of the island when Captain James Cook arrived and was killed in 1779.

This union was short, for within a year or two she left Kalaninuiamamao and married his brother Keeaumoku Nui. They had a son called Chief Keōua Nui, the father of Kamehameha I. How long she remained with Kalani Keʻeaumoku Nui is not known, but she is next known as the wife of Alapaʻi Nui, her cousin. With him she had a daughter, Manono I, grandmother of Keaoua Kekuaokalani who, at the abolition of the kapu system in 1819, took up arms in defence of the Hawaiian religion in the Battle of Kuamoʻo.
