= Puʻu o Mahuka Heiau State Monument =

Coordinates: 21°38′41″N 158°03′43″W

- Puʻu o Mahuka Heiau
- U.S. National Register of Historic Places
- U.S. National Historic Landmark
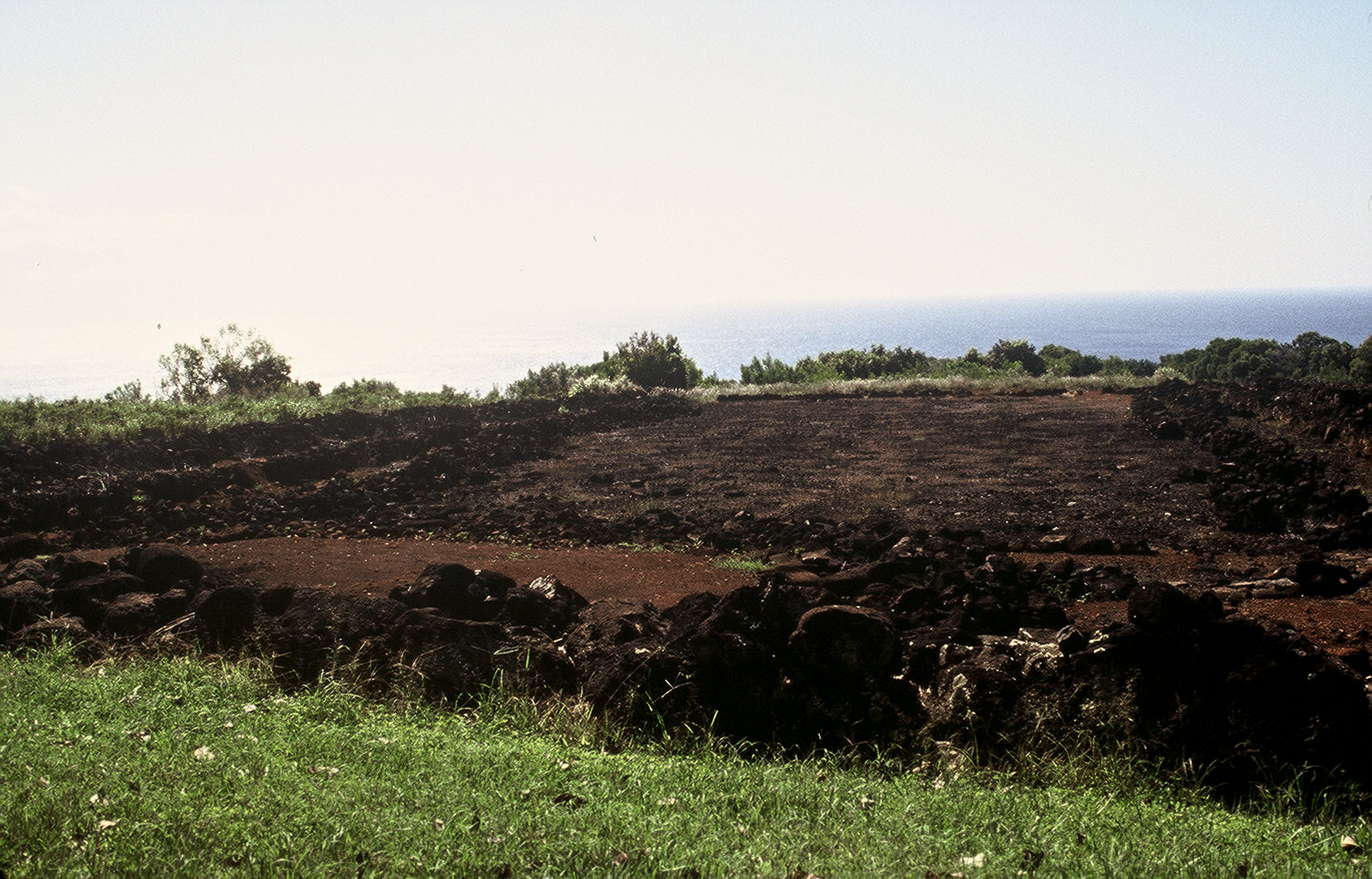
- Main platform at Puʻu o Mahuka Heiau

- Location within Hawaii
- Nearest city: Haleiwa, Hawaii
- Area: 2 acres (8,100 m^{2})
- Built: 17th century
- NRHP reference No.: 66000292

Significant dates
- Added to NRHP: October 15, 1966
- Designated NHL: December 29, 1962

Puʻu o Mahuka Heiau State Historic Site on the North Shore of Oʻahu is the largest heiau (temple) on the island, covering 2 acres (8,100 m^{2}) on a hilltop overlooking Waimea Bay and Waimea Valley. From its commanding heights, sentries could once monitor much of the northern shoreline of Oʻahu, and even spot signal fires from the Wailua Complex of Heiaus on Kauaʻi, with which it had ties. It was designated a National Historic Landmark in 1962, when it became the center of a 4-acre (16,000 m^{2}) state park. It was added to the National Register of Historic Places in 1966.

Puʻu o Mahuka means "Hill of Escape." Hawaiian legends have it that from this point, the volcano goddess Pele leaped from Oʻahu to the next island, Molokaʻi.

The highest of the heiau's three walled enclosures may date to the 17th century, with the lower two enclosures perhaps added during the 18th century. These were times of great conflict, and the upper platform appears to have functioned as a luakini heiau (a sacrificial temple) to bring success in war. During the 1770s, the overseer of this heiau was Kaʻopulupulu, the high priest of the last independent high chief of Oʻahu, Kahāhana. In 1792, George Vancouver's ship, HMS Daedalus, anchored near Waimea Bay to collect water. Three men in his shore party were killed in a skirmish with Native Hawaiians, 1930's archeologist J. Gilbert McAllister noted it was "probable" that the bodies of the three men were then taken to the heiau as human sacrifices. After Kamehameha I conquered Oʻahu in 1795, his high priest Hewahewa led religious ceremonies here and the heiau remained in use until the traditional kapu system was abolished in 1819.

At the start of Makahiki, the four months of Hawaiian New Year, an observer standing at Kaʻena Point would see the Pleiades (Makaliʻi) rising out of Pu'u o Mahuka Heiau just after sunset.

The site can be reached from Pupukea Homestead Road (Highway 835), which starts at Kamehameha Highway (Highway 83) across from Pupukea fire station.

== Gallery ==
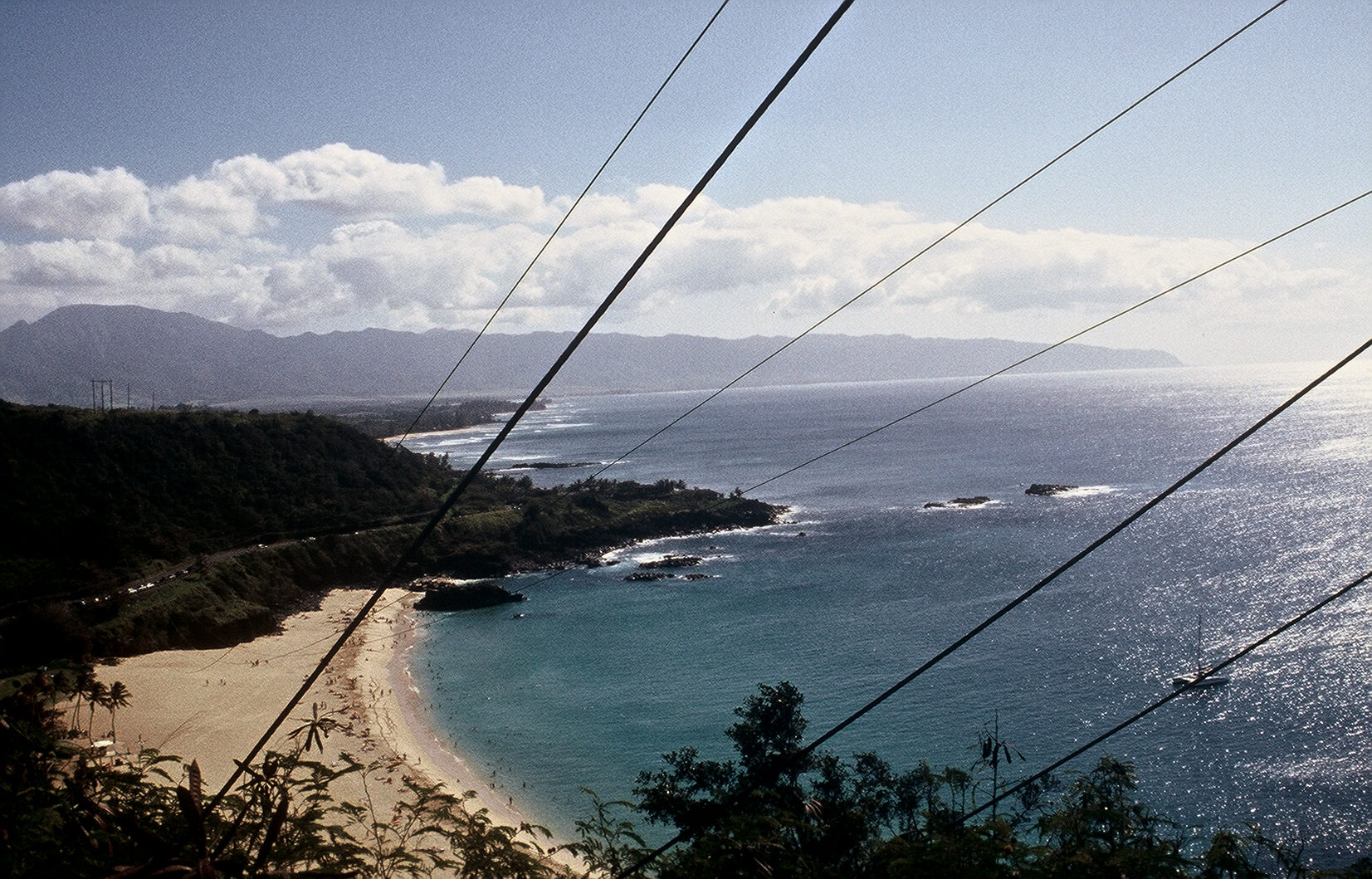
View of Waimea Bay from Pu'u o Mahuka Heiau

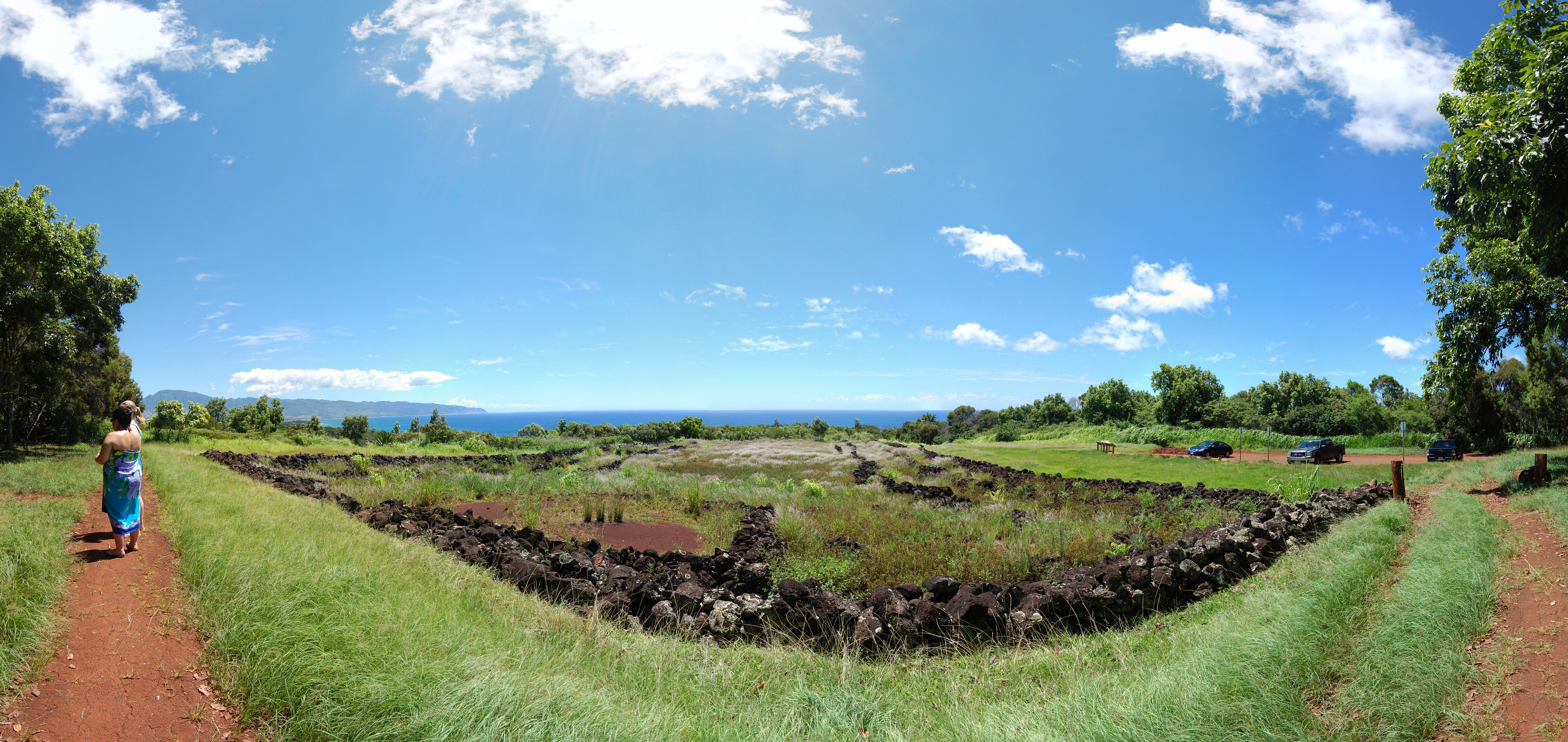
Panoramic view of Pu'u o Mahuka Heiau

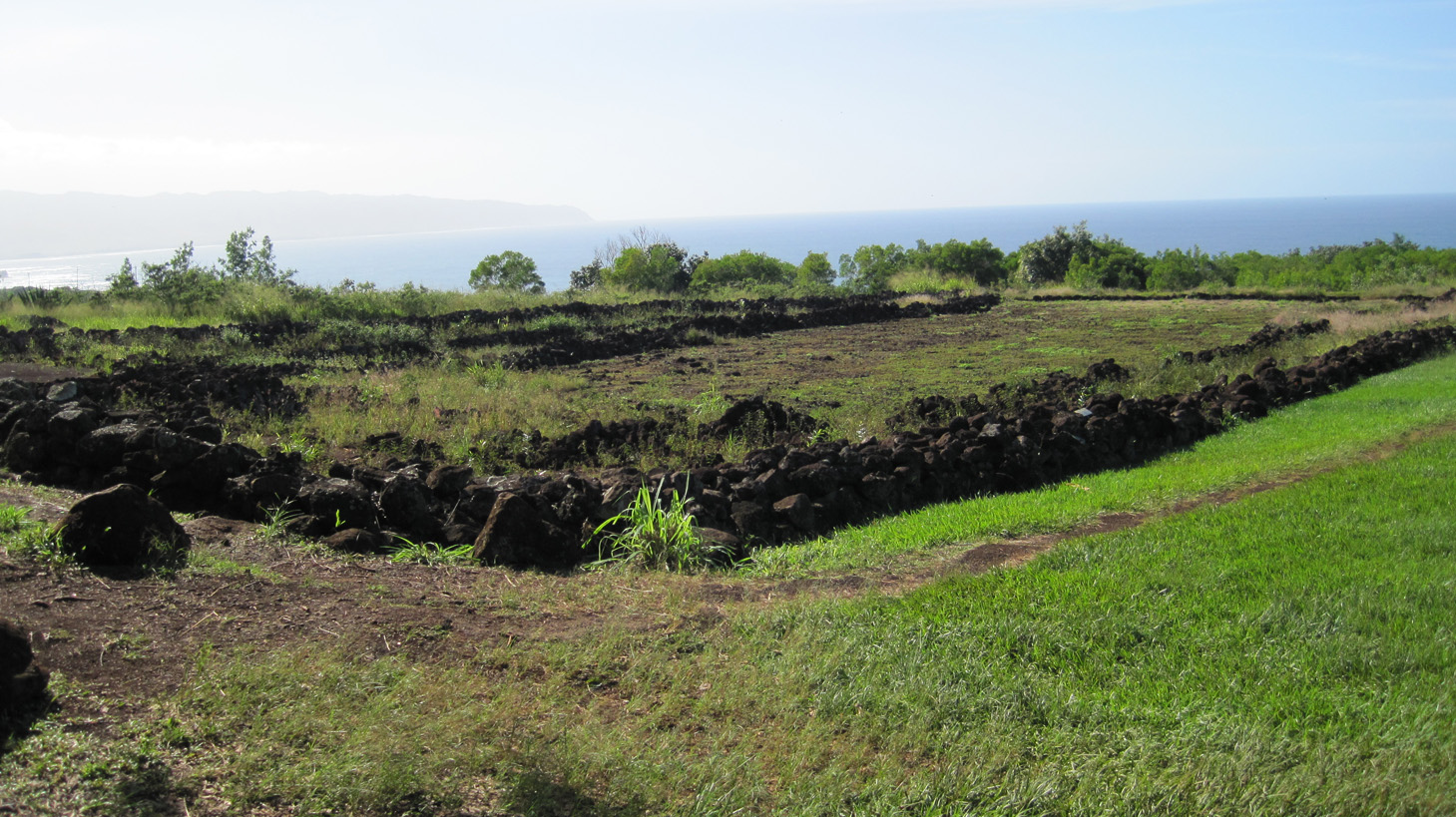
View from top corner toward Kaʻena Point

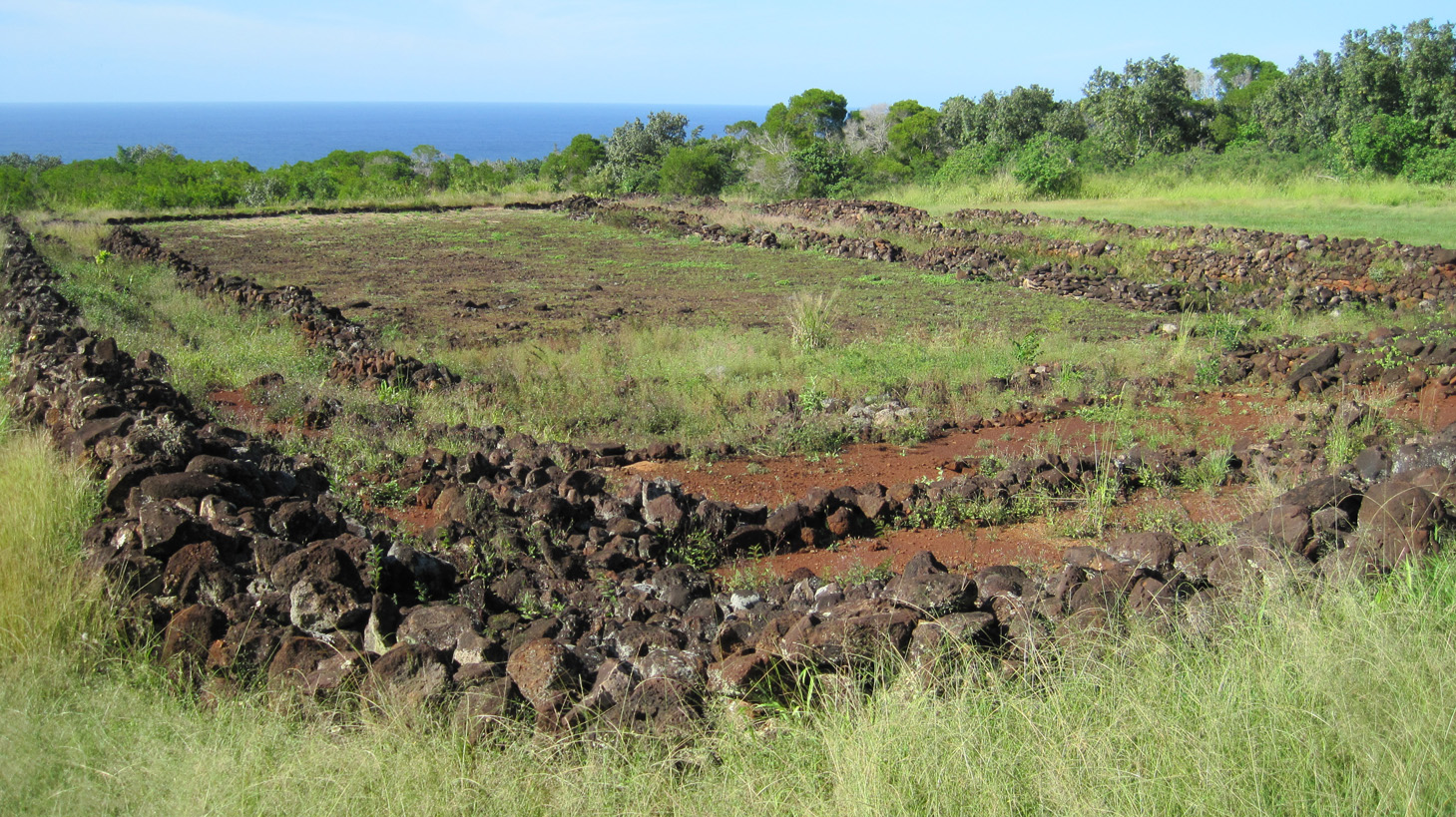
View from top corner looking north

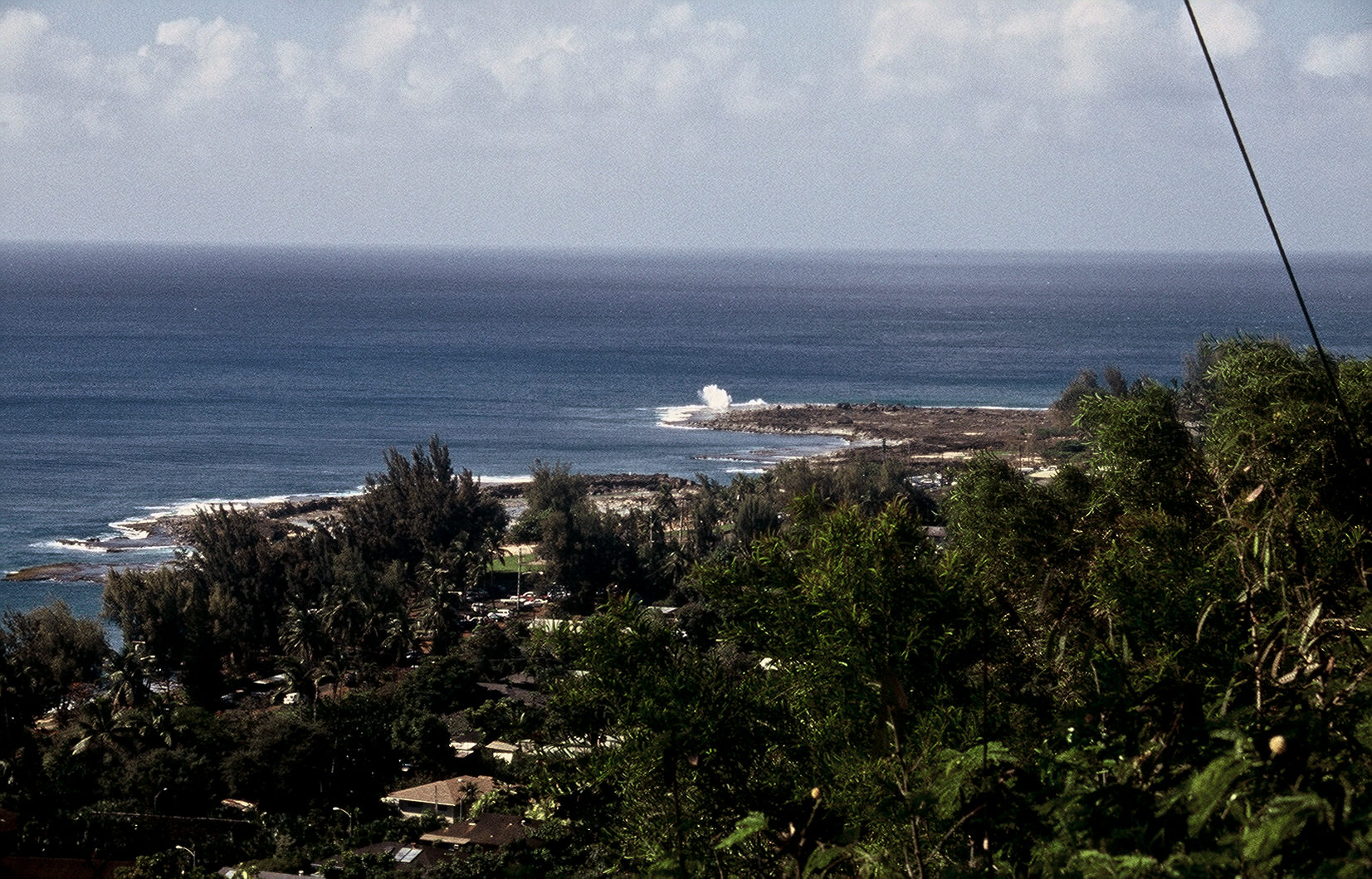
View toward Shark's Cove

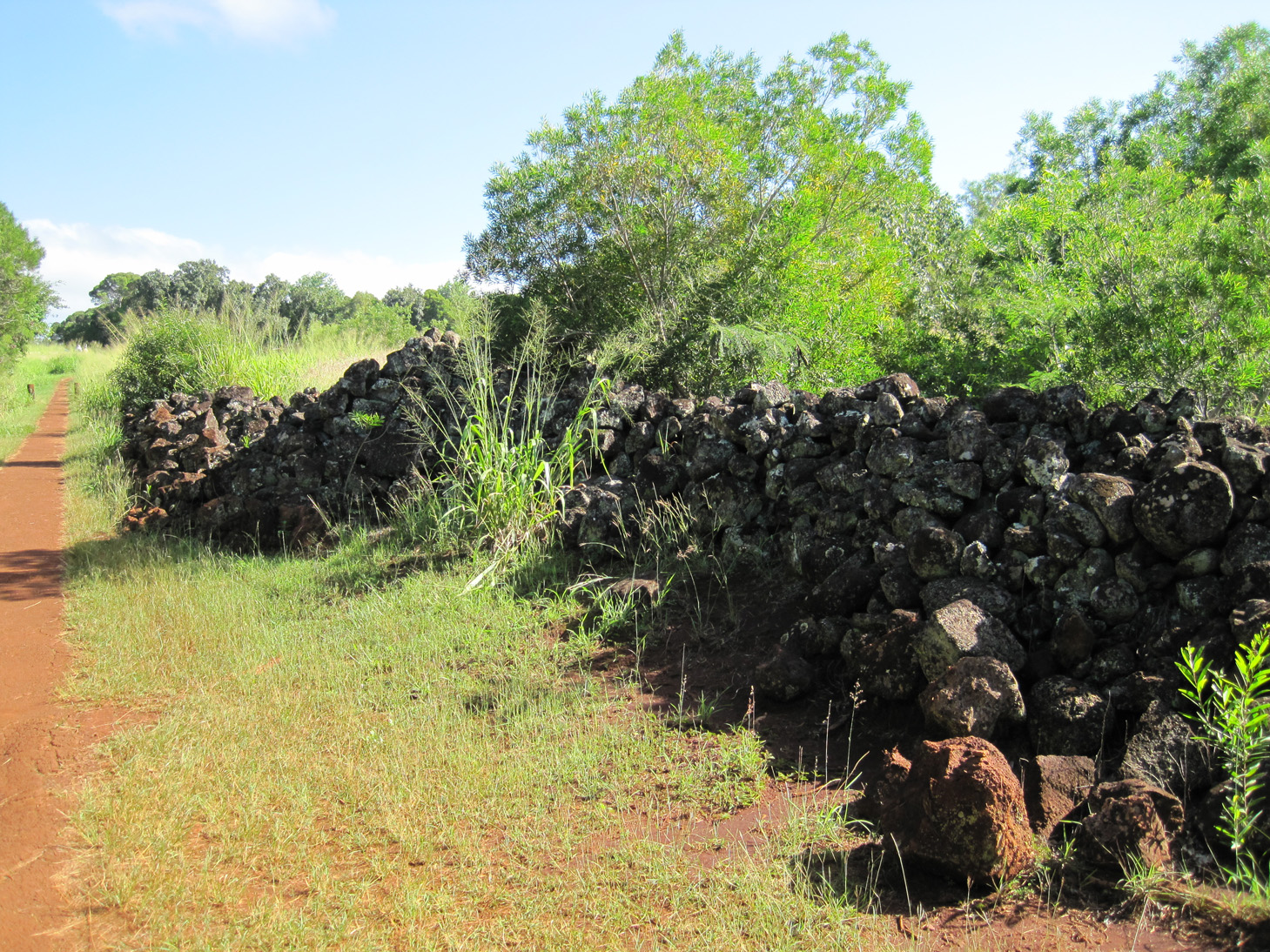
Lower wall and pathway

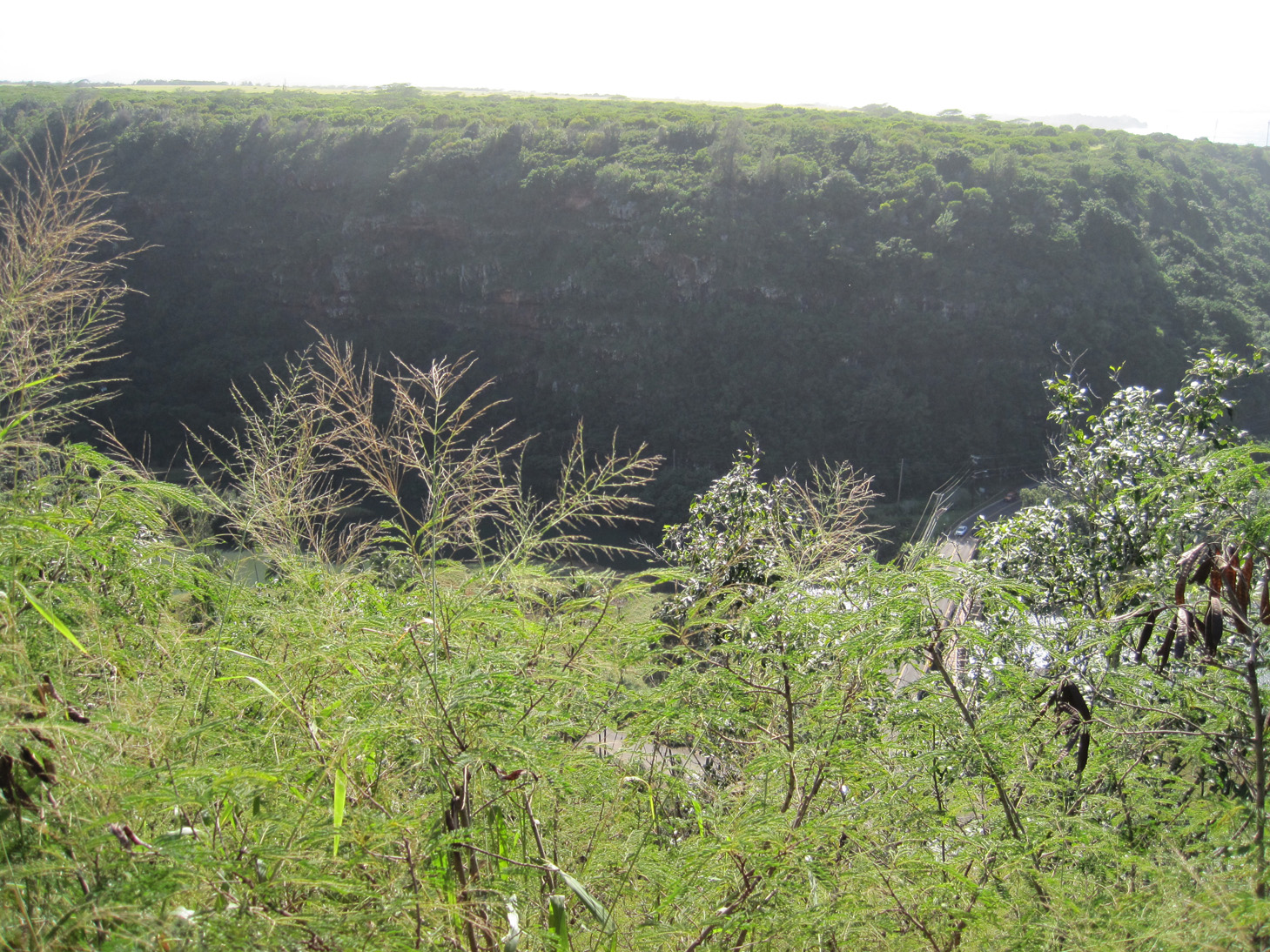
View across Waimea Valley

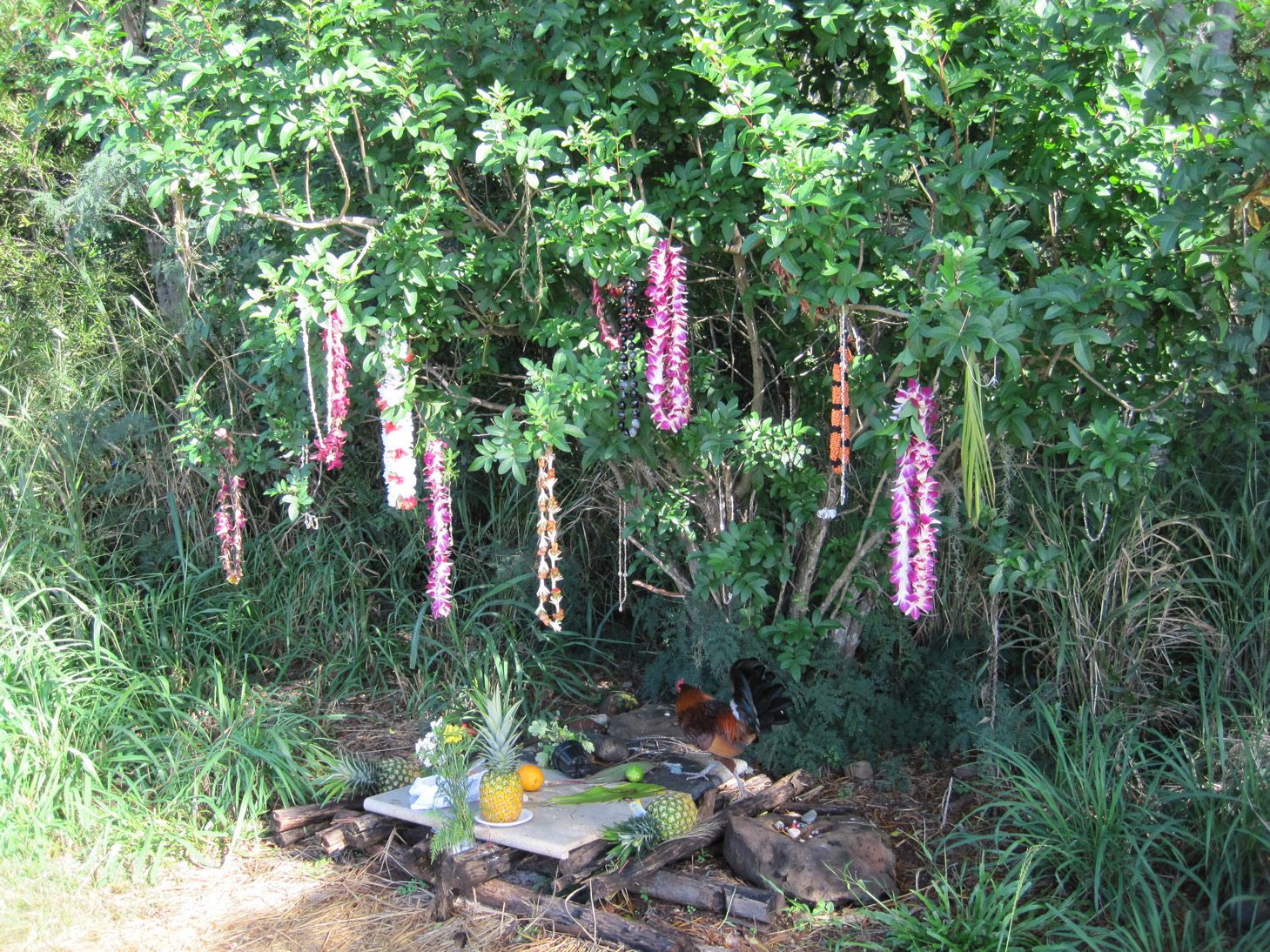
Visitor altar with guardian rooster
