= Waimea Valley =

Valley on the North Shore of Oahu, Hawaii, US

Coordinates: 21°38′02″N 158°03′06″W

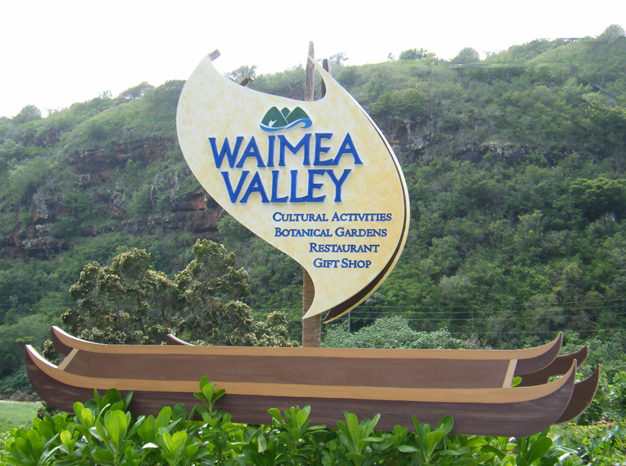
Waimea Valley Entrance

Waimea Valley is an area of historic cultural significance on the North Shore of Oahu, Hawaii. The valley, being an important place in Hawaiian religion, includes several historical structures including stone terraces and walls constructed during the time of the Hawaiian monarchy. The nutrient-rich volcanic soil combined with a rainy environment provided the resourceful Hawaiians of the area the opportunity to create one of the most prosperous farming communities in all of Polynesia. The area had complex fish ponds, domesticated animal pens, various large farming beds, and was famous for the cultivation of pink taro root stock, a coveted item to the Ali`i (the Hawaiian elite). Much of the garden floor was once cultivated for taro, sweet potato, and bananas, with new crops and orchards introduced by Europeans after their arrival.

== Sacred Hawaiian Mythology ==
Waimea Valley was considered one of the more recognized locations for its spiritual significance by Ancient Hawaiians. They were thought to partake in various indigenous religious activities, like human sacrifice. O’ahu’s largest heiau, or temple, resides there, overlooking the valley.

The valley is surrounded by three major Heiau. In the 1700s, Kaopulupulu, the Kahuna Nui who lived in the valley, built Pu'u o Mahuka on the pu'u (buff) called Keanaloa. Kupopolo Heiau, on the Haleiwa side of the valley's outer entrance, was likewise built under the guidance of the Kahuna Nui Kaopulupulu. Ke Ahu Hapu'u is a sacred location on the southwestern side of Waimea Bay, located on the water's edge. The shark god Kaneaukai is honored at this temple. Kaneaukai is a fishing shrine or temple, and Pu'u o Mahuka and Kupopolo are human sacrificial temples.

== Ancient ownership of Waimea Valley ==
In 1092 Waimea Valley was given to the high priests or the Kahuna Nui. It eventually became the home of one of the most distinguished priesthoods in the islands, the Pa'ao. Kamehameha the Great's exclusive Kahuna, Hewahewa, was a descendant of the Pa'ao. The Kahuna Nui were essential to Hawaiian society because they were the experts in various fields like farming, healing, spiritual guidance, fishing, and teaching both the Ali’i and the common people. Over the course of time, Waimea became known as “the valley of the priests”.

Due to overwhelming foreign influences, much change occurred in Hawai'i at this time. The traditional kapu (rule) legal system was beginning to disintegrate. Hewahewa turned to Christianity, repudiated Hawaiian gods, and assisted in the destruction of all heiau and religious idols, along with Kamehameha II and Ka'ahumanu (his co-ruler).

Waimea Valley was entrusted to Hewahewa's granddaughter Pa'alua after his death in 1837. Following the Mahele Land Redistribution Act of 1848, the newly constituted Land Commission offered her half of the Valley in exchange for her relinquishing any claim to the rest. She was able to keep her land until 1884 when she was pressured to mortgage and lease it due to a large debt. Because Hawaiians believed they were a part of the land, this was a difficult time for them. Many people were unfamiliar with the Western concept of land ownership. After her death in 1886, her property was foreclosed.

== Historical Nature Park ==
Formerly known as the Waimea Valley Audubon Center and the Waimea Arboretum and Botanical Garden, the Waimea Valley is a historical nature park including botanical gardens. It is located at 59–864 Kamehameha Highway, Haleiwa, Oahu, Hawaii and is open daily except for Christmas and New Year's Day; an admission fee is charged.

The garden was managed until 2003 by the City and County of Honolulu, when management was assumed by the National Audubon Society. In 2008, management was handed over to Hi'ipaka LLC, a non-profit company created by the Office of Hawaiian Affairs.

The garden now contains 35 distinct collections, representing some 5,000 taxa from around the world. It contains collections of Polynesian plants, as well as collections of very rare Hawaiian plants which are endangered species native to Lord Howe Island, and individual gardens dedicated to plants from Guam, Madagascar, the Mascarene Islands, the Ogasawara Islands, and the Seychelles.

Other major collections include the hibiscus evolutionary garden, araceae, bauhinia, bromeliaceae, heliconia, liliaceae, as well as bamboo, begonia, ferns, tropical fruit, etc. Among many other tropical plants of note, there are Calamondin citrus trees in the parking lot.

The garden valley is approximate 0.75 miles (1.21 km) in length, with a small waterfall and swimming hole at the valley's hind end.

=== Images ===
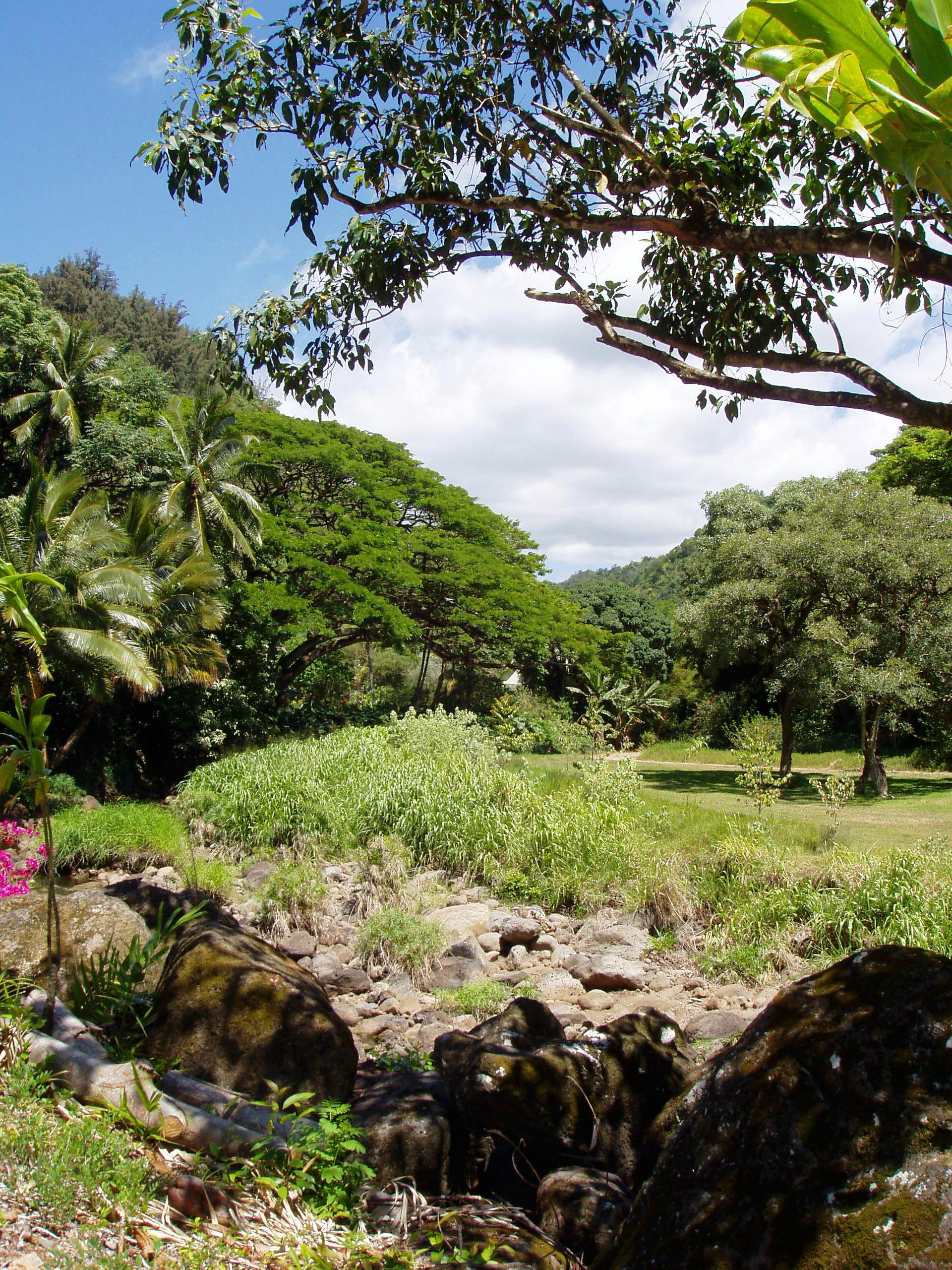

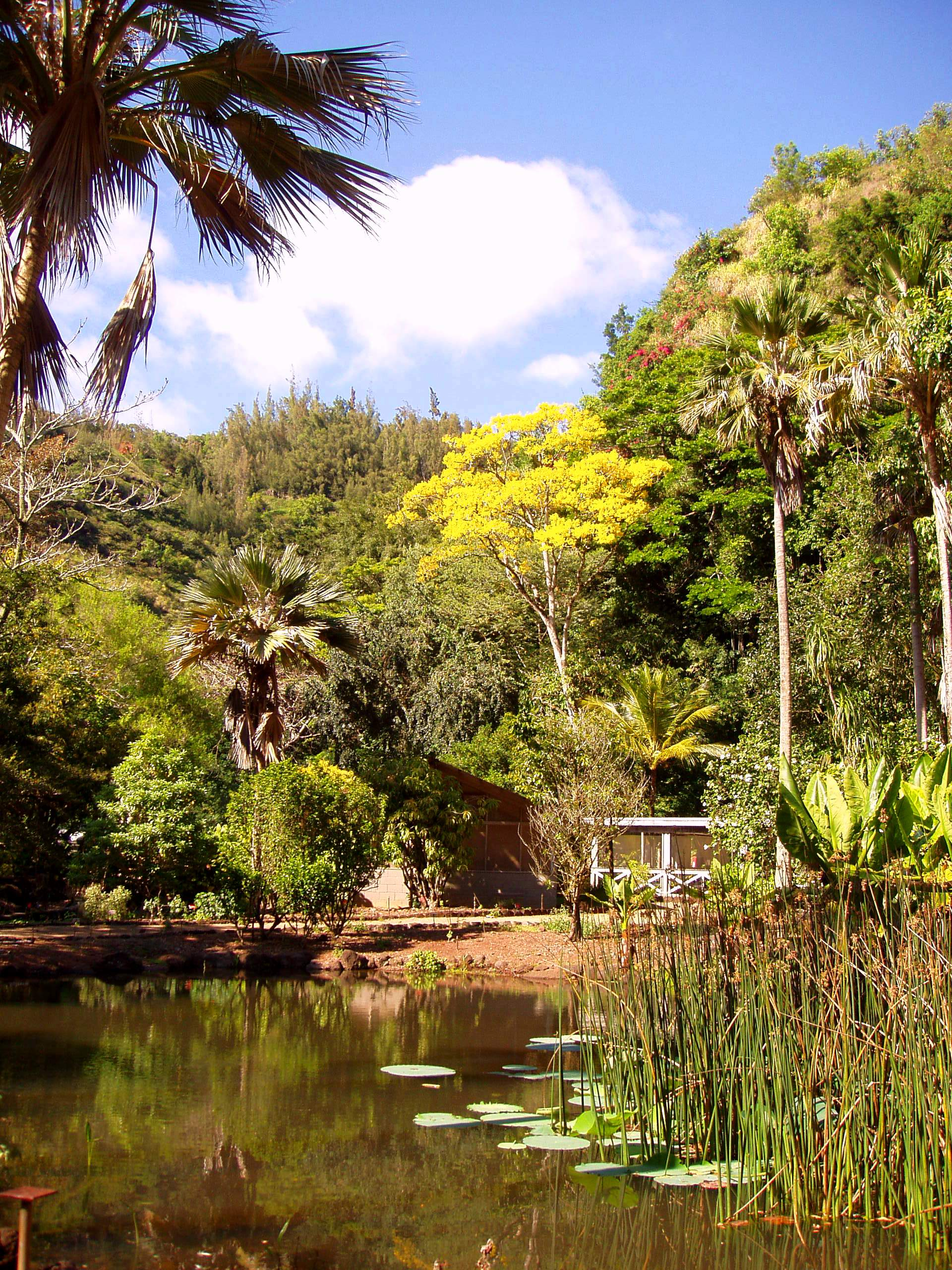

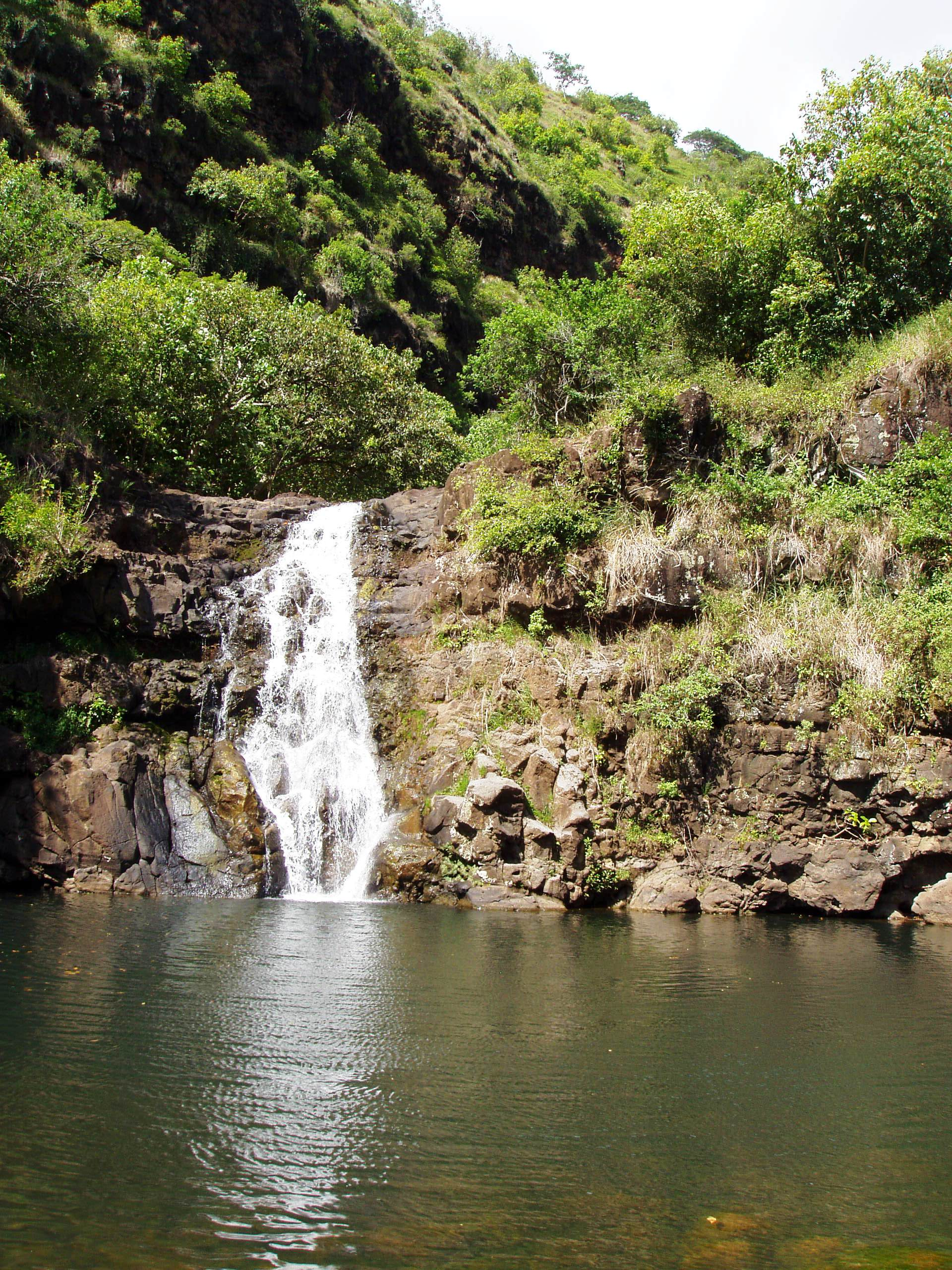

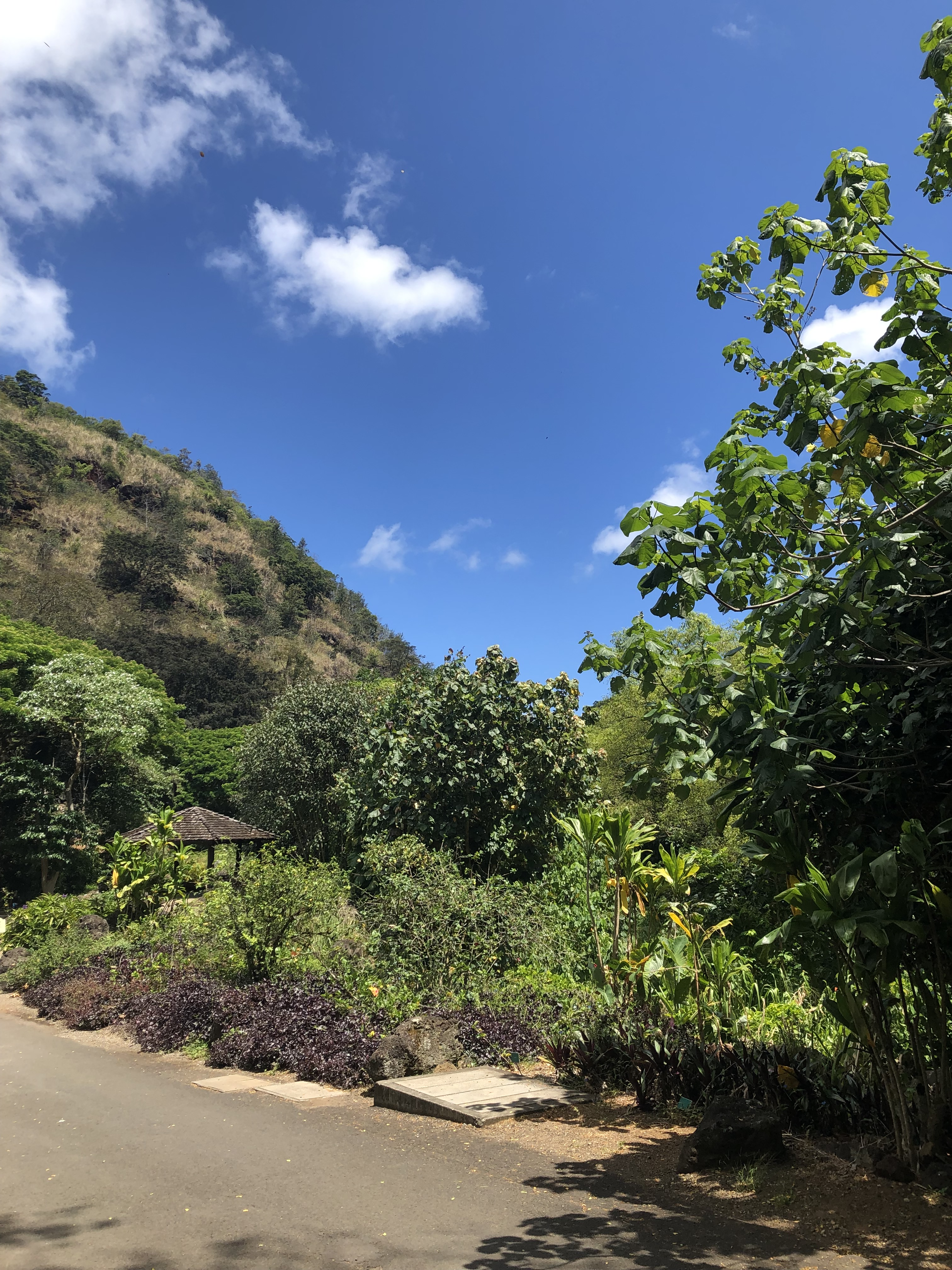

== Activities ==
Waimea is well-known for its surfing (he'enalu), but one of the most popular water activities was Wai Pu'uone. The Ancient Hawaiians rode the waves on their boards up the sand dunes and into the river mouth when the river (muliwai) was blocked by sand bars. It could be a hair-raising event depending on how high the dunes were.

The falls have been used for cliff diving featuring hourly exhibition. Swimming is allowed when divers are not performing and when the weather permits. Additionally, hula performances were done several times daily.

== Climate ==
Waimea Valley has a tropical rainforest climate (Köppen: Af) with mostly warm to hot temperatures throughout the year. The all time record high is 97 °F (36 °C) on July 17, 1989, whilst the all time record low is 45 °F (7 °C) on February 16, 1986, and February 4, 1993. Waimea Valley falls into the USDA Plant Hardiness Zone 12a.

Climate data for Waimea Valley, Hawaii, 1991–2020 normals, extremes 1983–present
| Month | Jan | Feb | Mar | Apr | May | Jun | Jul | Aug | Sep | Oct | Nov | Dec | Year |
|---|---|---|---|---|---|---|---|---|---|---|---|---|---|
| Record high °F (°C) | 88 (31) | 92 (33) | 91 (33) | 90 (32) | 95 (35) | 94 (34) | 97 (36) | 94 (34) | 94 (34) | 92 (33) | 90 (32) | 88 (31) | 97 (36) |
| Mean maximum °F (°C) | 83.9 (28.8) | 84.3 (29.1) | 85.6 (29.8) | 86.4 (30.2) | 88.6 (31.4) | 88.9 (31.6) | 88.9 (31.6) | 89.9 (32.2) | 90.3 (32.4) | 89.6 (32.0) | 86.8 (30.4) | 83.4 (28.6) | 91.6 (33.1) |
| Mean daily maximum °F (°C) | 78.1 (25.6) | 78.6 (25.9) | 79.4 (26.3) | 81.1 (27.3) | 83.1 (28.4) | 84.4 (29.1) | 85.1 (29.5) | 86.4 (30.2) | 86.2 (30.1) | 84.3 (29.1) | 81.4 (27.4) | 78.8 (26.0) | 82.2 (27.9) |
| Daily mean °F (°C) | 70.2 (21.2) | 70.4 (21.3) | 71.6 (22.0) | 73.3 (22.9) | 74.8 (23.8) | 76.7 (24.8) | 77.5 (25.3) | 78.4 (25.8) | 77.9 (25.5) | 76.5 (24.7) | 74.1 (23.4) | 71.8 (22.1) | 74.4 (23.6) |
| Mean daily minimum °F (°C) | 62.4 (16.9) | 62.2 (16.8) | 63.7 (17.6) | 65.4 (18.6) | 66.5 (19.2) | 68.9 (20.5) | 70.0 (21.1) | 70.4 (21.3) | 69.7 (20.9) | 68.7 (20.4) | 66.8 (19.3) | 64.7 (18.2) | 66.6 (19.2) |
| Mean minimum °F (°C) | 55.4 (13.0) | 55.4 (13.0) | 57.2 (14.0) | 59.8 (15.4) | 60.9 (16.1) | 64.6 (18.1) | 65.4 (18.6) | 66.1 (18.9) | 65.4 (18.6) | 64.1 (17.8) | 61.0 (16.1) | 58.8 (14.9) | 54.4 (12.4) |
| Record low °F (°C) | 47 (8) | 45 (7) | 47 (8) | 54 (12) | 55 (13) | 59 (15) | 59 (15) | 55 (13) | 59 (15) | 58 (14) | 52 (11) | 50 (10) | 45 (7) |
| Average precipitation inches (mm) | 4.68 (119) | 4.03 (102) | 5.58 (142) | 4.15 (105) | 3.63 (92) | 3.50 (89) | 3.94 (100) | 3.24 (82) | 3.32 (84) | 4.39 (112) | 6.09 (155) | 5.47 (139) | 52.02 (1,321) |
| Average precipitation days (≥ 0.01 in) | 19.2 | 17.3 | 20.9 | 21.2 | 19.4 | 22.7 | 24.3 | 22.6 | 21.1 | 22.7 | 23.7 | 24.7 | 259.8 |
Source: NOAA

== See also ==
- List of botanical gardens in the United States
- Waimea Bay, Hawaii
