= ʻAi Noa =

1819 social upheaval in Hawaii

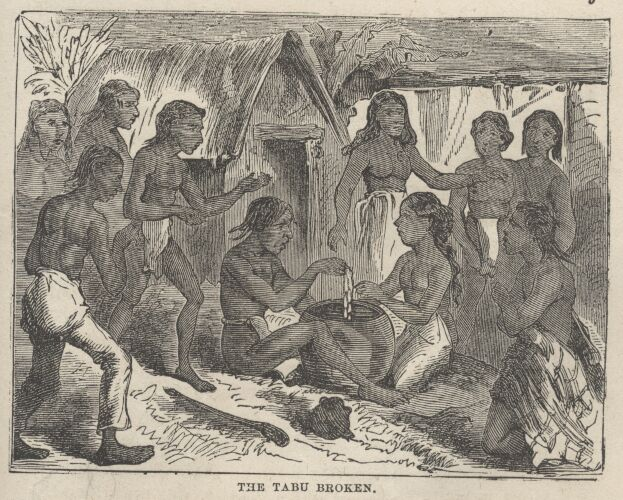
As depicted in Mark Twain's Roughing It, 1872

The ʻAi Noa (Hawaiian: literally free eating), was a period of taboo-breaking which convulsed the Hawaiian Islands in October 1819. Women were allowed to eat forbidden food and to eat with men; the priests were no longer to offer human sacrifices; the many prohibitions surrounding the high chiefs were relaxed.

Kamehameha I, the conqueror of the islands, had just died; his son Liholiho succeeded him (and was later known as King Kamehameha II). He came to power amid scenes of grief and licence.

The usually strict rules of the Hawaiian religion and social system, known as kapu, were in abeyance during the usual mourning period. Women ate pork and bananas, people had sexual intercourse with whomever they pleased, routine life was completely overthrown. When a new high chief came to power, he usually re-imposed the kapu.

Liholiho did attempt to reestablish the kapu, but he was opposed by his mother, Keōpūolani, the other wives of Kamehameha (including Kaʻahumanu, the powerful Maui chiefess), and Hewahewa, the Kahuna-nui of the kingdom. He took refuge in his canoe and after sailing about aimlessly for two days on the west coast of the Big Island of Hawaiʻi, he landed and ate the feast of dogmeat (ordinarily reserved for women) that the chiefesses had prepared for him. Messengers were then sent over the islands announcing that eating was free and the kapu had fallen.

Some Hawaiian leaders opposed the efforts to abolish the Hawaiian religion. A faction led by Keaoua Kekuaokalani, a nephew of Kamehameha I and former student of Hewahewa, revolted against Kamehameha II and his court. Despite gathering some support, the rebels were defeated at the Battle of Kuamo'o in December 1819, marking the end of organized resistance against Hewahewa and his supporters.

The downfall of the old religion was further hastened by the arrival of Christian missionaries a few months later.

== See also ==
- Ee ja nai ka - similar carnivalesque phenomenon coinciding with bakumatsu-era of Japan

== Primary sources ==
- Kamakau, Samuel (1992) [1961]. Ruling Chiefs of Hawaii (Revised ed.). Honolulu: Kamehameha Schools Press. ISBN 0-87336-014-1.
- Kamakau, Samuel M. (1843). History of the Sandwich Islands. Lahainaluna: Press of the Mission Seminary.

== Secondary sources ==
- Daws, Gavan (1968). Shoal of Time: A History of the Hawaiian Islands. University of Hawaii Press. ISBN 0824803248.
- Kuykendall, Ralph Simpson (1938). The Hawaiian Kingdom, 1778 – 1854. University of Hawaii Press. ISBN 978-0-87022-431-7.
