= List of cemeteries in Hawaii =

This list of cemeteries in Hawaii includes currently operating, historical (closed for new interments), and defunct (graves abandoned or removed) cemeteries, columbaria, and mausolea which are historical and/or notable. It does not include pet cemeteries.

== Hawaii (island) ==
- ‘Alae Cemetery
- Kuamoo Burials (also known as the Lekeleke Burial Grounds), Kuamo'o Bay, North Kona District
- Nāʻālehu Cemetery

== Kauai ==
- Kapaa Chinese Cemetery, Kapaa, Hawaii
- Kapaa-Kealia Cemetery, Kauai County, Hawaii
- Lihue Public Cemetery, Lihue, Hawaii

== Maui ==
- Mokuʻula cemetery, Lahaina
- Saint Joseph Catholic Church (Makawao, Hawaii)
- Waiola Church Cemetery (also known as Waineʻe Church Cemetery), Waiola Church, Lahaina

== Oahu ==
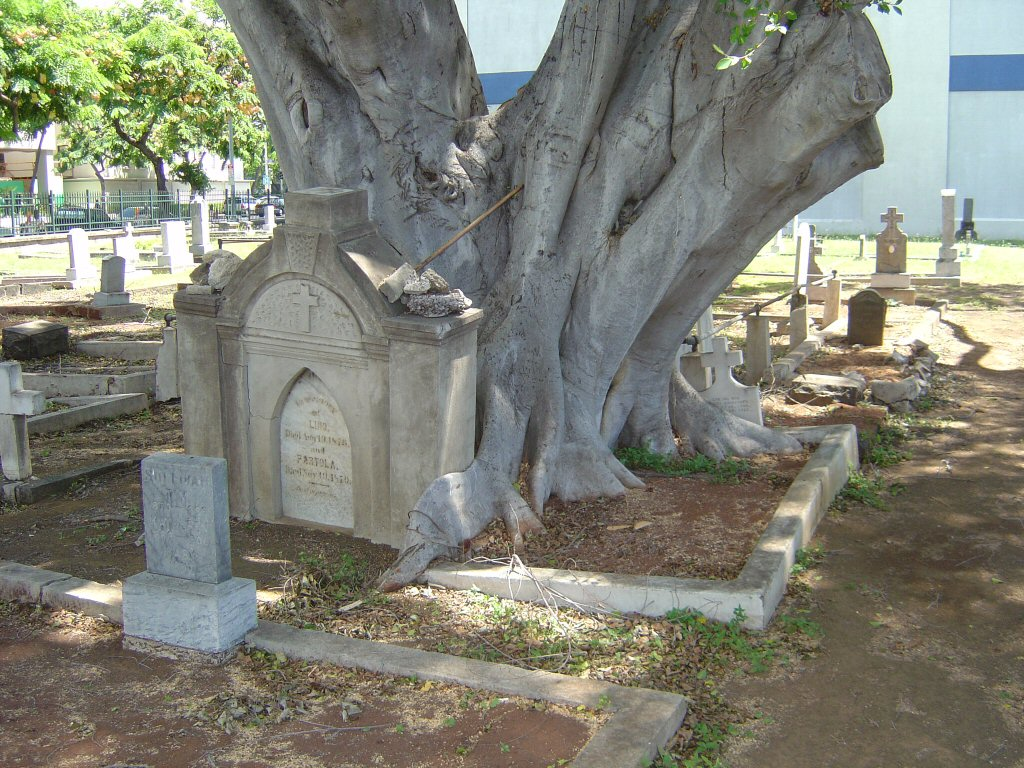
Honolulu Catholic Cemetery grave

- Hawaii State Veterans Cemetery, Kaneohe
- Honolulu Catholic Cemetery, Honolulu
- Kyoto Gardens of Honolulu Memorial Park, Honolulu
- Lunalilo Mausoleum, Honolulu
- Manoa Chinese Cemetery
- National Memorial Cemetery of the Pacific, Honolulu
- Oahu Cemetery (also known as Nuʻuanu Cemetery), Honolulu
- Royal Mausoleum (Mauna ʻAla), Honolulu
- USS Utah, Pearl Harbor,
- USS Arizona Memorial, Pearl Harbor,
- Valley of the Temples Memorial Park, near Kāneʻohe

== See also ==
- List of cemeteries in the United States
