= Hewahewa =

Hawaiian religious leader

- Born: c. 1774; Island of Hawai’i
- Died: February 16, 1837; Waimea, O’ahu
- Occupation: Kahuna Nui (high priest)

Hewahewa (c. 1774 – February 16, 1837) was a Hawaiian religious leader who served as kahuna nui (high priest) of King Kamehameha I and his successor Kamehameha II. Hewahewa was a powerful figure in the royal court of Hawai’i and played a major role in the abolition of the kapu system, the decline of the native religion of Hawai’i, and the introduction of Christianity to the Hawaiian Kingdom.

== Biography ==
=== Kahuna Nui ===
Hewahewa was born in the late 18th century. In 1819, French explorer Louis de Freycinet estimated Hewahewa was born around 1774. He grew up as part of the aristocracy of the pre-unified kingdom of the island of Hawaiʻi and was a descendant of Paʻao, a lineage that added to his prestige as a spiritual leader. Hewahewa's great-grandfather was Holoʻae, (Note: Historian Samuel Kamakau stated that Holoʻae was both the grandfather of Hewahewa and Hewahewa's father Puʻou.) the kahuna of Alapaʻinui and Kalaniʻōpuʻu, the latter of whom ruled during James Cook's fatal visit to the islands. Hewahewa's grandfather was Pailili (or Pailiki) and his father was Puʻou, a kahuna of Kalaniʻōpuʻu's successor Kamehameha I. A cousin of Hewahewa was Kekūhaupiʻo, the instructor and military advisor of Kamehameha.

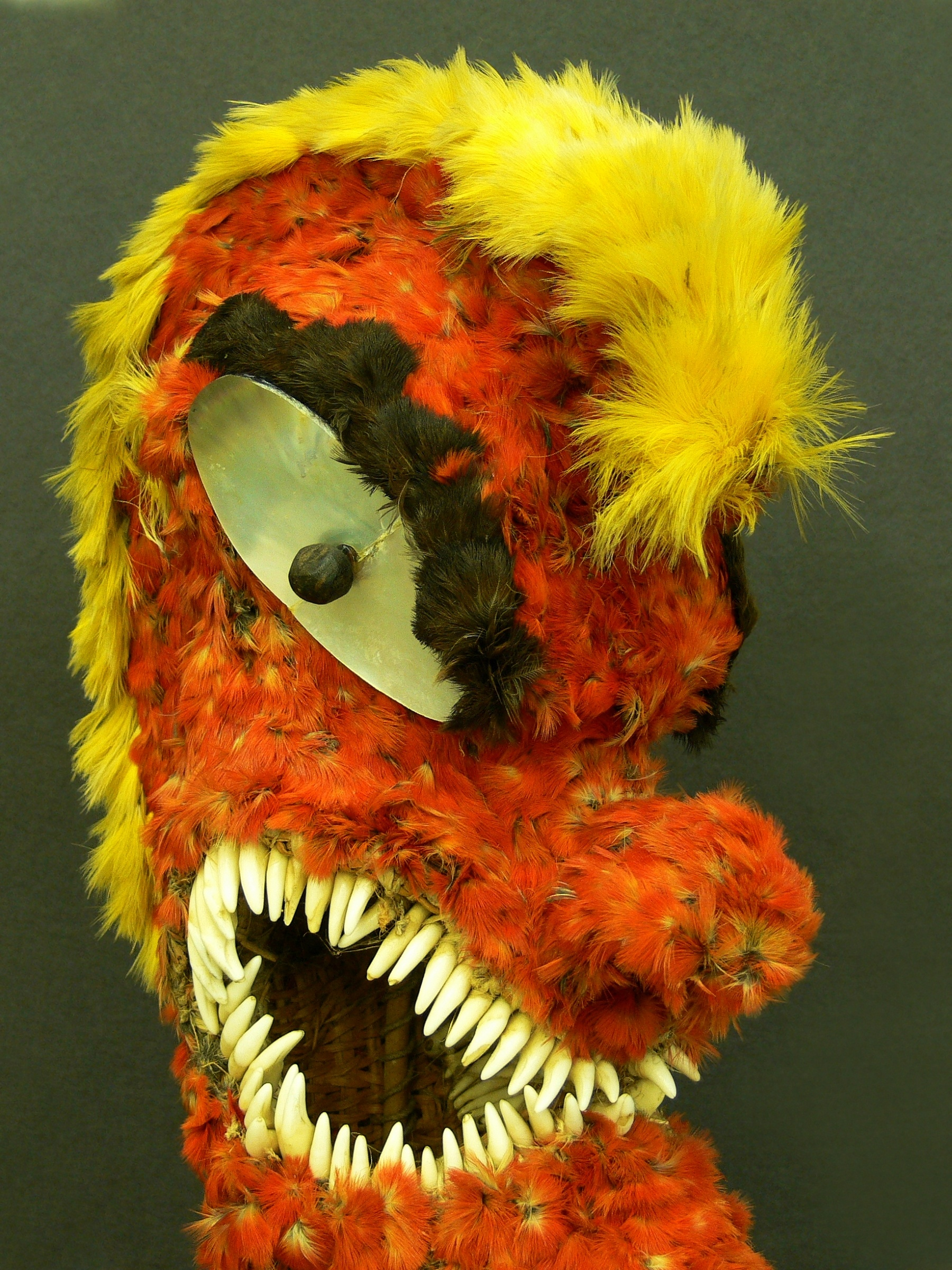
19th-century feather sculpture depiction of Kūkaʻilimoku, the war god of Kamehameha I and Hewahewa's priestly line

Hewahewa was educated as a kahuna and rose to prominence in the court of Kamehameha. Hewahewa and his family line were of the order of the war god Kū (moʻo Kū), which rose to prominence during the conflict that led up to the unification of the Hawaiian Islands and displaced the priestly order of the fertility god Lono. After Kamehameha united the Hawaiian islands into the Hawaiian Kingdom, he granted Hewahewa control over the Waimea Valley on Oahu, a powerful position within the kingdom. By the 1810s, Hewahewa was serving as kahuna-nui (high priest) and was responsible for maintaining the kapu code of conduct at the behest of King Kamehameha.

=== Abolition of the kapu system ===
In 1819, King Kamehameha died and his son Kamehameha II became the new monarch. Kamehameha II was not as strong a ruler as his father; his court advisers—including Hewahewa—began to exert influence over the kingdom. As kahuna-nui, Hewahewa was tasked with implementing and enforcing the kapu on the islands but by the time of Kamehameha II's ascension to the throne, Hewahewa had grown disillusioned with the system. His doubts were reinforced by the efforts of Kaʻahumanu, the late Kamehameha I's favorite wife, who had a relationship with high priest and persuaded him action was needed to break the kapu. Acting on his views, Hewahewa and other court officials—including several female members of the royal family—planned to abolish the kapu. The reformers' first target was a law that forbade women to eat certain foods and from eating with noblemen. At a grand feast held six months after Kamehameha I's death, his son was persuaded to eat alongside his female relatives; the women also ate forbidden foods at the feast, ushering the era of ʻAi Noa (free eating). While this display was criticized by more conservative members of Hawaiian society, it was also seen as breaking the monarchy's support of the kapu.

Soon after the feast, Hewahewa embarked on a campaign to rid the kingdom of the kapu system. He was supported by a reformist faction within the kahunas and by two of Kamehameha I's queens, Kaʻahumanu—who persuaded Hewahewa to support the adoption of ʻAi Noa—and the king’s mother Keōpūolani. Acting in his role as kahuna-nui, Hewahewa ordered the burning of religious idols, the destruction of heiaus, and the end of the kapu. Not all of the native Hawaiian religion was interfered with; family ʻaumākua remained untouched and the kahuna retained much of their political power as scholars and healers.

Some Hawaiian leaders opposed Hewahewa's efforts to abolish the Hawaiian religion. A reactionary faction led by Keaoua Kekuaokalani, a nephew of Kamehameha I and former student of Hewahewa, revolted against Kamehameha II and his court. Despite gathering some support, the rebels were defeated at the Battle of Kuamo'o in December 1819, marking the end of organized resistance against Hewahewa and his supporters.

=== Introduction of Christianity ===
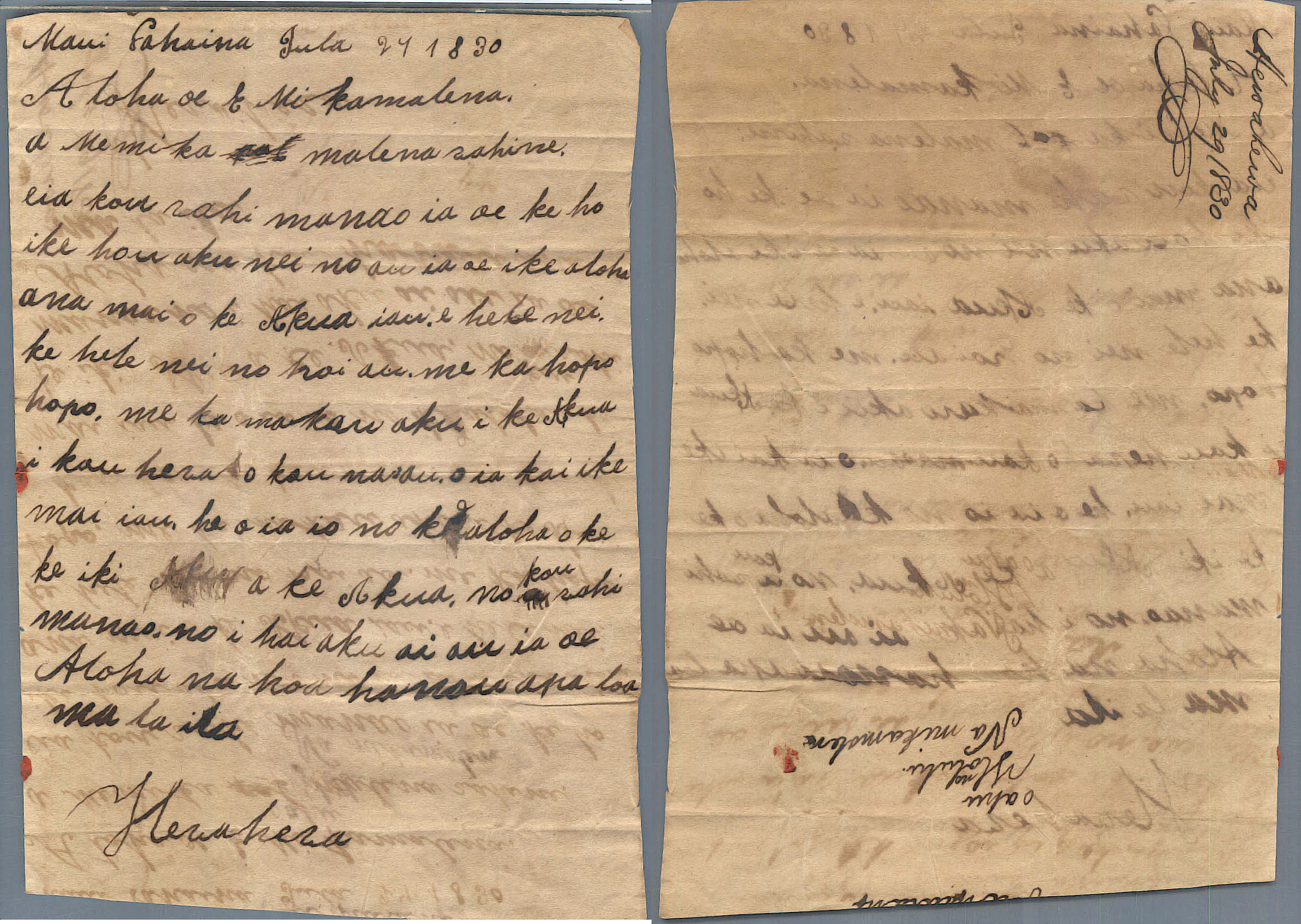
Letter written on July 27, 1830, from Hewahewa to Mikamalena (Levi Chamberlain) to affirm his ongoing faith in God

In 1820, Christian missionaries arrived on the island. Many members of the Hawaiian nobility, including Hewahewa, eventually converted to Christianity; multiple sources note the introduction of Christianity filled the spiritual void left by the dissolution of the kapu system. According to some sources, Hewahewa had predicted the arrival of a new god from the sea in the days before the first missionaries arrived in the islands.

As the Christian faith spread throughout the Hawaiian islands, Hewahewa remained supportive of many of the new faith's systems of belief; rather than the traditional Hawaiian deities, he thanked Jehovah for food during a feast in place and composed a chant to worship the new god. Hewahewa remained supportive of free eating; he ate alongside women and later resigned his office as kahuna. Hewahewa's dialogue with the missionaries also persuaded the powerful chiefess Kapiʻolani to adopt the Christian faith.

Though the decline of the Hawaiian religion had decreased Hewahewa's influence as a spiritualist, he remained important in the Hawaiian Kingdom into the 1830s. As an old man, he was called upon by Kamehameha III in an attempt to restore the native Hawaiian faith but Hewahewa persuaded the king to abandon the effort. Hewahewa was also known for exhibiting signs of alcoholism.

According to reports in the contemporaneous Ke Kumu Hawaii and the Sandwich Island Gazette, Hewahewa died on February 16, 1837, at his home in Waimea, Oahu. He was ill for four months before his death and had asked his friends to pray for his salvation. There is, however, some discrepancy about his date of death; in 1893, Nathaniel Bright Emerson, who was born 1839, remembered Hewahewa "as a silent and wrinkled old man, who lived in a retired valley in Waialua, Island of Oahu, about the year 1848".

== Legacy ==
Thousands of Hawaiians, including pioneering lifeguard Eddie Aikau, are descendants of Hewahewa. In 2019, several acres of Hewahewa's lands in Waimea Valley, which were bestowed upon him by Kamehameha in the early 19th century, were granted protected status.

The Hawaiian insect Hevaheva Kirkaldy, 1902, a genus of true bugs in the family Triozidae may have been named in honor of Hewahewa, although that is not explicitly stated (see open access original publication BHL).

In 2000, Hewahewa was posthumously inducted into the Hawaiian Music Hall of Fame with a group of historical Hawaiian chanters.

== Bibliography ==
- Emerson, Nathaniel Bright (1893). "Long Voyages of the Ancient Hawaiians". Papers of the Hawaiian Historical Society. Honolulu: The Bulletin Publishing Company: 1–34. hdl:10524/965.
- de Freycinet, Louis; Kelly, Marion (1978). Hawaií in 1819: A Narrative Account. Honolulu: Department of Anthropology, Bernice Pauahi Bishop Museum. OCLC 4827597.
- Kamakau, Samuel (1992) [1961]. Ruling Chiefs of Hawaii (Revised ed.). Honolulu: Kamehameha Schools Press. ISBN 0-87336-014-1. OCLC 25008795.
- McKinzie, Edith Kawelohea (1983). Stagner, Ishmael W. (ed.). Hawaiian Genealogies: Extracted from Hawaiian Language Newspapers. Vol. 1. Honolulu: University of Hawaii Press. ISBN 0-939154-28-5. OCLC 12555087.
- Pukui, Mary Kawena; Haertig, E. W.; Lee, Catherine A. (1972). Nānā i Ke Kumu (Look to the Source). Honolulu: Hui Hanai. ISBN 978-0-916630-13-3. OCLC 228660193.
- Sahlins, Marshall (1996). How "Natives" Think: About Captain Cook, For Example. Chicago: University of Chicago Press. ISBN 978-0-226-73369-2. OCLC 1016115445.
- Webb, M. C. (March 1965). "The Abolition of the Taboo System in Hawaii". The Journal of the Polynesian Society. 74 (1). Wellington: The Polynesian Society: 21–39. JSTOR 20704251. OCLC 5544737967.
