= Kapuku =

Hawaiian belief of reincarnation

In Hawaiian mythology, kapuku or kupaku is the magic of reincarnation (see necromancy). The former word means "to restore life" in Hawaiian while the later means "to recover from a nearly fatal illness."
