= Kalola-a-Kumukoa =

Queen Consort and High Chiefess of Hawaii

- Spouse: Kamehameha I Kekuamanoha
- Issue: Kahiliʻōpua
- Father: Kumukoa
- Mother: Kaulahoa
- Religion: Hawaiian religion

Kalola-a-Kumukoa, also known as Kalolawahilani, also known simply as Kalola, was the first wife of Kamehameha I. She was a high chiefess (Aliʻi) of Hawaii.

== Family ==
Her father was Kumukoa (Kumu-ko'a-a-Keawe, also called Kumuhea), a son of Keaweʻīkekahialiʻiokamoku. Both Keawe and Kumukoa were among the remains moved from the Royal tomb to the Royal Mausoleum in the Nuuanu Valley. Her mother was Ka'ulahoa. Her brother was Kalaikuʻahulu, also a son of Kumukoa.

She was first wife of the king Kamehameha I before the Battle of Mokuʻōhai. The couple lived with Kamehameha's brother in Hilo along with the god Kū, whom Kamehameha had possession of, given by his uncle Kalaniʻōpuʻu.
