= Alapaʻi =

Chief of Hawaiʻi Island (d. 1754)

- Aliʻi nui of Hawaiʻi
- Died: 1754
- Wives: Keaka; Kamakaʻīmoku; Kamaua ʻUmiaemoku
- Issue: Keaweʻōpala; Manono I
- Father: Kauaua-a-Mahi
- Mother: Kalanikauleleiaiwi
- Religion: Hawaiian religion

Alapaʻi (full name: Alapaʻinuiakauaua; also known as Alapaʻi I or Alapaʻi Nui, "Alapaʻi the Great") (died 1754) was aliʻi nui of Hawaiʻi. He was a usurper to the throne, but was considered a good ruler, one who loved the common people, although there is a story that he was responsible for the death of Keōua, the first aliʻi nui of unified Hawaiʻi. Alapaʻi's title in Hawaiian was aliʻi nui.

== Biography ==
=== Family ===
Alapaʻi was a son of Chief Kauaua-a-Mahi and Chiefess Kalanikauleleiaiwi. Alapaʻi's brother was Haae-a-Mahi, and Alapaʻi's half-siblings included Kekuʻiapoiwa I and Kalanikeʻeaumoku, who were also Alapaʻi's first cousins by virtue of Kalanikauleleiaiwi's other marriages. The king of the island was Keaweʻīkekahialiʻiokamoku. Alapaʻi ruled as the chief of Kohala, subordinate to the King of Hawaiʻi.

=== Reign ===
After the death of his uncle Keaweʻīkekahialiʻiokamoku and the subsequent civil war between Kalanikeʻeaumoku and Kalaninuiamamao, Alapaʻi emerged as the victor and usurped the throne of Hawaiʻi. He reigned during one of the bloodiest period of Hawaiian history in an era of great warrior king fighting for the domination over the neighboring islands.

War continued between the century-old rivals Hawaiʻi and Maui during the early part of his rule while the old Kekaulike was still on the throne. After Kekaulike's death, his relations with Maui were friendly, and he helped his nephew Kamehamehanui Aiʻlūʻau regain his throne from his half-brother Kauhiaimokuakama. His reign also saw a bitter conflict between Hawaiʻi and Oahu over the latter's invasion of the island of Molokai, where Alapaʻi's relatives ruled. Alapaʻi invaded Moloka`i and killed Oʻahu's Ali`i Aimoku Kapiiohookalani (Kapiono-o-kalani) at the Battle of Kawela and later invaded the island of Oʻahu in 1736. Kanaha-o-kalani became 21st Ali`i Aimoku of O`ahu succeeding his father Kapiiohookalani.

Kapiʻiohookalani's brother Peleʻioholani returned from Kauaʻi and repelled Alapaʻi's invasion force on O`ahu, taking up a counter-offensive on Moloka`i and Maui by allying with Chief Kauhiaimokuakama, Ali`i of Maui. The war eventually ended in a truce between Alapaʻi and Peleʻioholani.

When his niece Kekuʻiapoiwa II was pregnant with Kamehameha I, she had a craving for the eyeball of a shark, a sign that the child would be a killer of chiefs. Alapaʻi secretly made plans to have the newborn infant killed but was thwarted by the intervention Naeʻole who escaped with the child. He later reconciled with the baby and allowed it to be raised at his court placing him in the charge of his favorite wife Keaka.

=== Marriages ===
Alapaʻinui had many wives, but only the names of three principal wives survived, and the name of one minor wife. Alapaʻi's first wife was Keaka. Their son was Keaweʻōpala.

Alapaʻi's second wife was Kamakaʻīmoku and their daughter was Manono I.

Alapaʻi's third wife was Kamaua with whom he had Kauwaʻa, a daughter, and Mahiua, a son. Kauwaʻa had two daughters: Julia Alapai and Kaulunae, who married Kanehiwa and was the mother of Lipoa, a son, and Julia Moemalie, a daughter.

Alapaʻinui was also married to ʻUmiaemoku; they had a child, Keaweamahi.

Alapa’i had many descendants, Duke Kahanamoku, Julia Alapai, and Kawaawaaiki Alapa’inui Naehu were some of many of Alapaʻi's descendants.

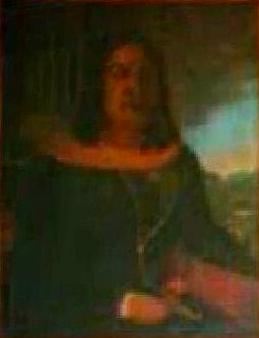
Julia Alapai

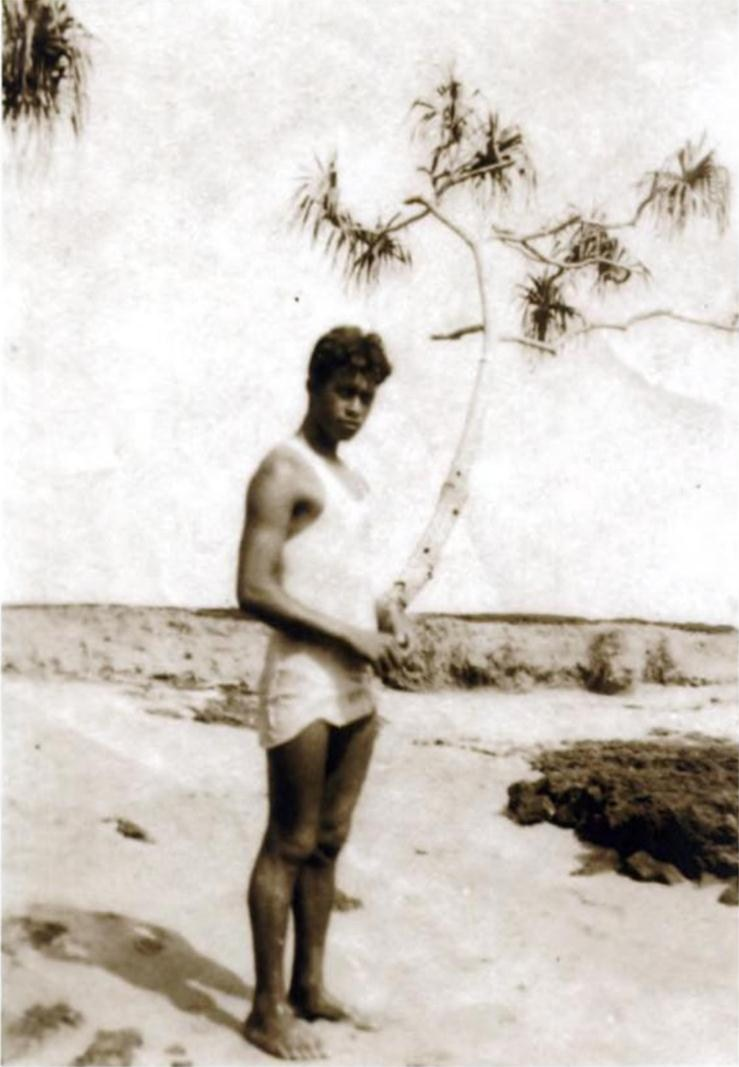
Duke Kahanamoku

After his death in 1754, Alapaʻinui was initially succeeded by his son Keaweʻōpala, however, Keaweʻōpala would eventually be overthrown by Kalaniʻōpuʻu.

Preceded by Keaweʻīkekahialiʻiokamoku	Ruler of Hawaiʻi; 1725–1754	Succeeded by Keaweʻōpala
