= Kuamoʻo Burials =

United States historic place in Hawaiʻi

- U.S. National Register of Historic Places
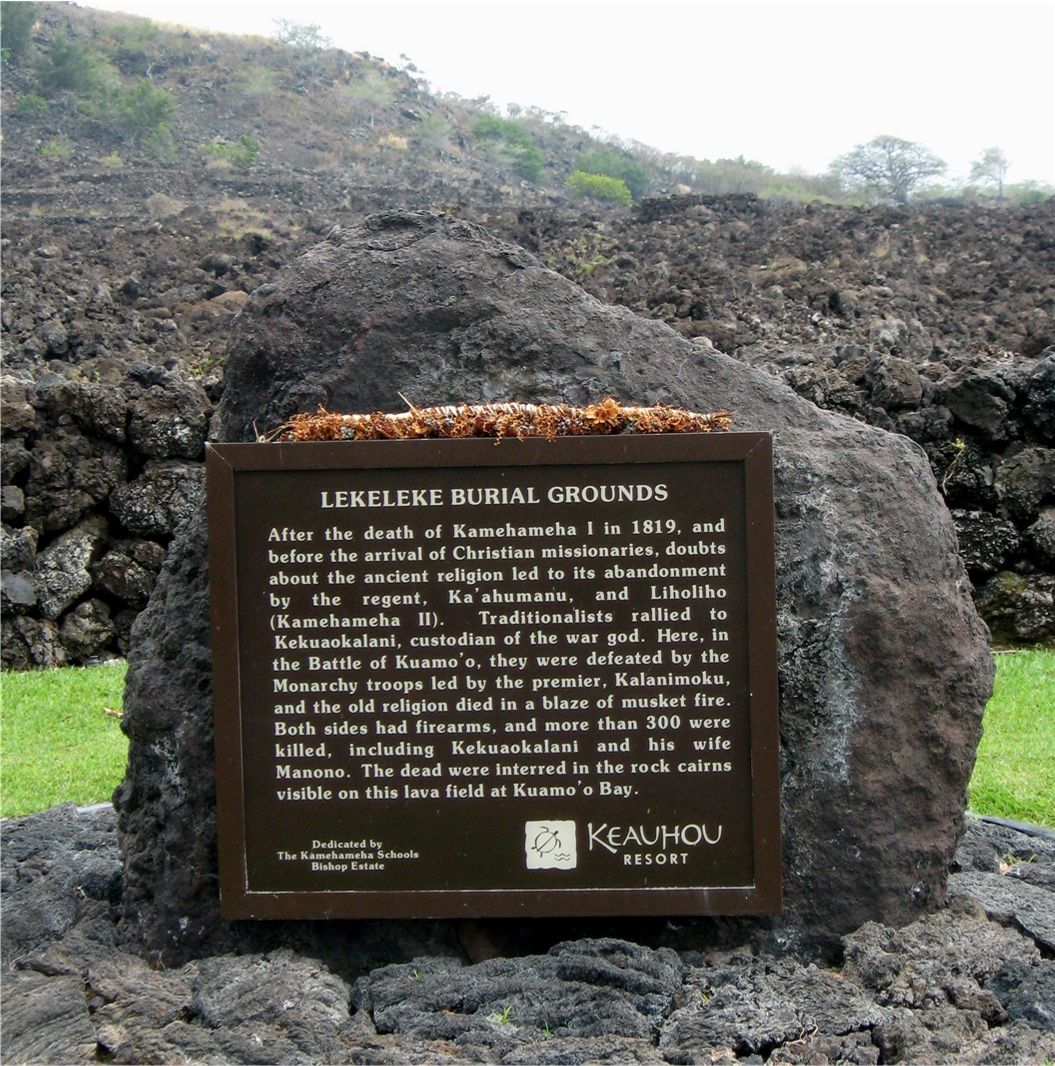

- Location within Hawaii
- Location: Kona District, Hawaii
- Coordinates: 19°33′3″N 155°57′32″W
- Built: 1819
- Architectural style: Dry stack masonry
- NRHP reference No.: 74000714
- Added to NRHP: 1974

The Kuamoʻo Burials (also known as the Lekeleke Burial Grounds) is an historic Hawaiian burial site for warriors killed during a major battle in 1819. The site is located at Kuamoʻo Bay in the North Kona District, on the island of Hawaiʻi, United States.

== History ==
Despite some contact with Europeans, Kamehameha I, after creating a united Kingdom of Hawaii, followed the ancient Hawaiian Religion called the Kapu system. When he died in May 1819, power passed to his wife Queen Kaʻahumanu and Kamehameha I's son Liholiho (Kamehameha II) who abolished the kapu system, leaving Hawaii religionless; Christian missionaries didn't reach Hawaii until the March 30, 1820. However, Kamehameha I's nephew Kekuaokalani wanted to keep the kapu system. Kekuaokalani led an armed rebellion to protect the traditions still honored by many of the common people. The traditionalists marched from Kaʻawaloa at Kealakekua Bay and met the royal army headed by Kalanimoku in an area also known as Lekeleke in December 1819. Both sides in the battle at this site had rifles, but Kalanimoku had a small cannon mounted on a double canoe, so over 300 warriors were killed, including Kekuaokalani and his wife Manono, who were buried under the lava rocks. The rest of the followers of the old religion dispersed, and were pardoned. Within a year, American Christian Protestant missionaries such as Asa Thurston and Hiram Bingham arrived, and the culture was forever changed. There has not been a battle of that size on the island since.

The battlefield is listed on the Hawaii register of historic places as site 10-37-1745, and was added to the National Register of Historic Places in 1974 as site 74000714. The name comes from the Ahupuaʻa (traditional land division), point, and bay called Kuamoʻo just to the South where the battle actually took place. It literally means "backbone" in the Hawaiian Language. The burial ground was called Lekeleke, on the border between the Ahupuaʻa of Keauhou and Honalo. Just to the North of this site is the Keauhou hōlua and historic Keauhou Bay.

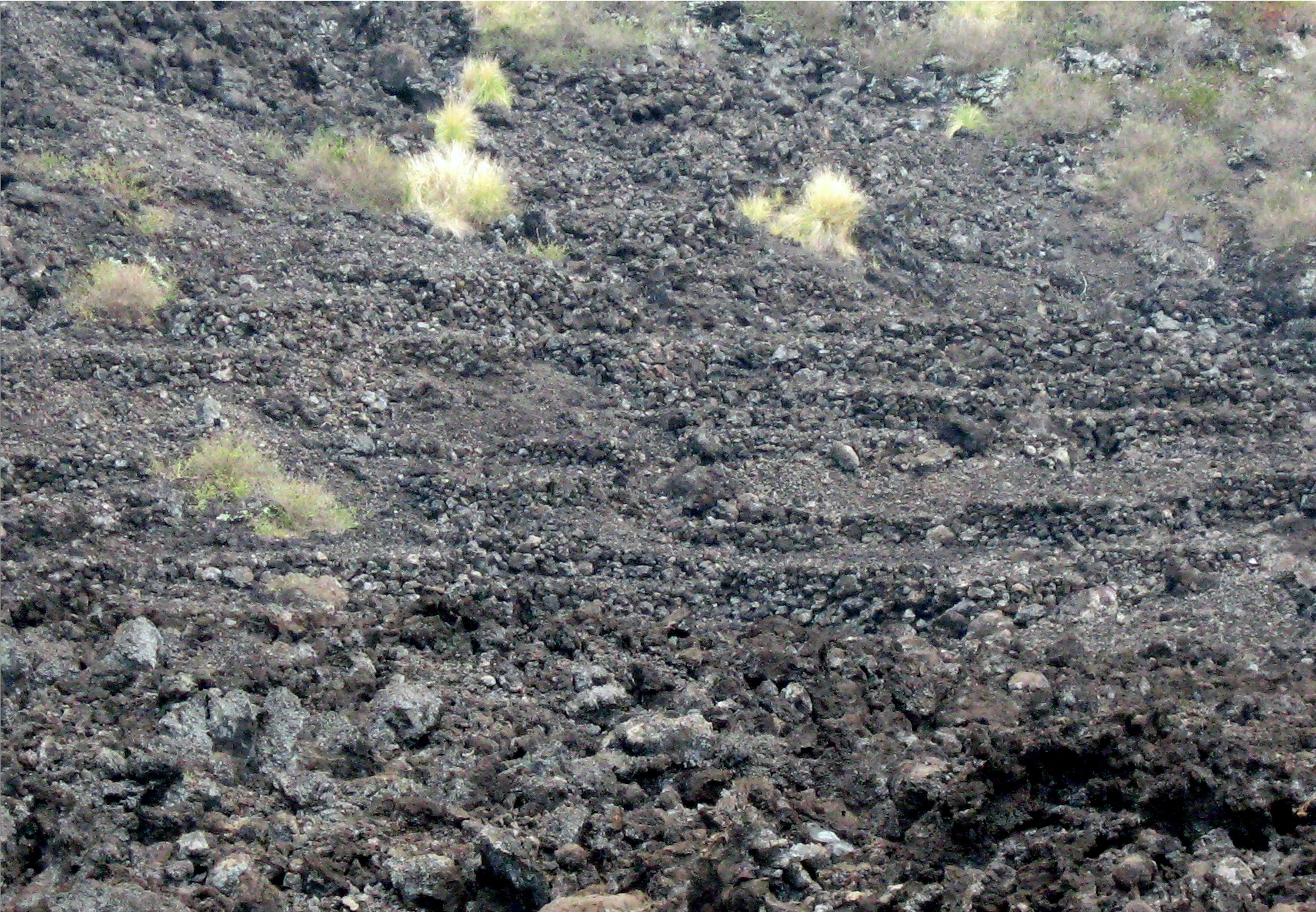
The remains of the fallen on both sides were buried in these terraces of lava rock

== Kekua-o-kalani ==
King David Kalakaua in his book entitled "Hawaiian Legends: Introduction," in 1888 eulogizes the leader Kaiwi-kuamo'o-kekuaokalani as follows: "In the twilight of that misty period looms up a grand defender of the faith of Keawe and Umi and the altars of the Hawaiian gods. The champion was Kekuaokalani, a nephew, perhaps a half-brother of Liholiho (King Kamehameha II). In his veins coursed the royal blood of Hawaii, and his bearing was that of a king. He was above six and one-half feet in height (6 feet 6 inches), with limbs well-proportioned and features strikingly handsome and commanding. He was of the priesthood, and, through the bestowal of some tabu or prerogative, claimed to be the second in authority to Hewahewa, who traced his lineage back to Pa'ao, the Tahitian High Priest of Pili. His wife, Manono, was scarcely less distinguished for her courage, beauty and chiefly status."

== See also ==
- List of cemeteries in Hawaii
