= Manono I =

Hawaiian high chiefess

- Spouse: Keōua
- Issue: Kiʻilaweau
- Father: Alapainui
- Mother: Kamakaʻīmoku

Manono I was a Hawaiian High Chiefess.

She was the daughter of Alapainui and Chiefess Kamakaʻīmoku. Manono was the granddaughter of Chiefess Kalanikauleleiaiwi of Hawaiʻi and niece of chief Haae-a-Mahi

Manono married her half-brother Keōua and bore him a daughter Kiʻilaweau. Manono was a grandmother of Keaoua Kekuaokalani.
