= Kapu (Hawaiian culture) =

Ancient Hawaiian code of conduct

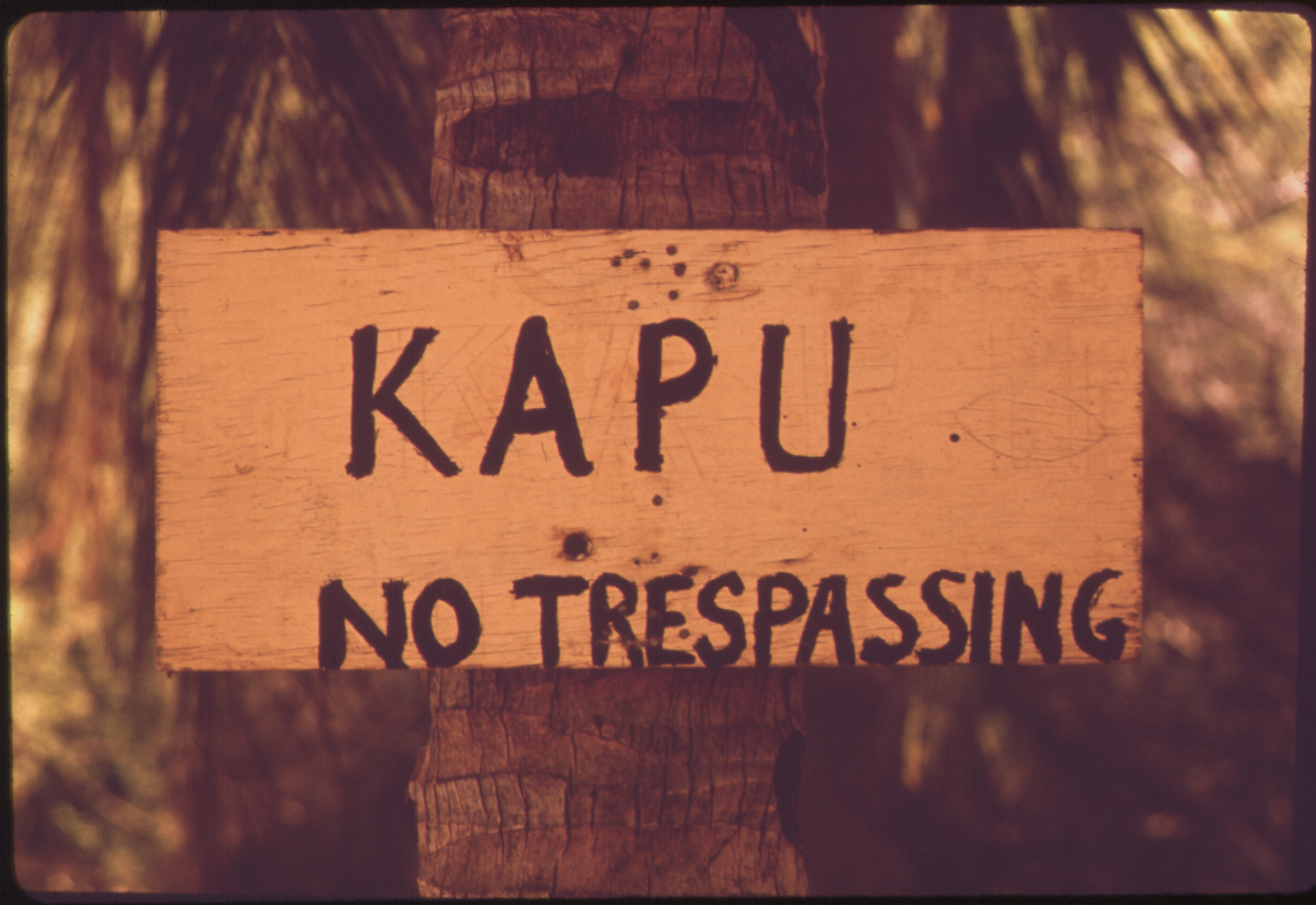
"Kapu" used on a "no trespassing" sign.

Kapu is the ancient Hawaiian code of conduct of laws and regulations. The kapu system was universal in lifestyle, gender roles, politics and religion. An offense that was kapu was often a capital offense, but also often denoted a threat to spiritual power, or theft of mana. Kapus were strictly enforced. Breaking one, even unintentionally, often meant immediate death, Koʻo kapu. It is related to the concept of tapu or tabu found in other Polynesian cultures, from whence came the English word "taboo." The Hawaiian word kapu is usually translated to English as "forbidden", though it also carries the meanings of "keep out", "no trespassing", "sacred", "consecrated", or "holy".

The opposite of kapu is noa, meaning "common" or "free".

== Kahili ==
The Kahili were restrictions placed upon contact with chiefs (kings), but these also apply to all people of known spiritual power. Kapu Kū mamao means prohibited from a place of the chief, while Kalu noho was to assemble before the chief. It was kapu when entering a chief's personal area to come in contact with his hair or fingernail clippings, to look directly at him, and to be in sight of him with a head higher than his. Wearing red and yellow feathers (a sign of royalty) was kapu, unless an individual was of the highest rank. Places that are kapu are often symbolized by Pahu Kapu, two crossed staffs, each with a white ball atop.

== ʻAi Kapu ==
The ʻAi kapu was the kapu system governing contact between men and women. Many aliʻi obtained their power through this system, and then would give thanks to the god of politics Kū. ʻAi means "to eat" and Kapu means sacred. Therefore, it is translated to "sacred eating". In this practice men and women could not eat meals together. Furthermore, certain foods such as pork (the body form of the god Lono), most types (67 of the 70 varieties) of bananas (body form of the god Kanaloa), and coconuts (body form of the god Kū) were considered kapu to women. This not only prohibited women from eating these, but also their contact in contexts such as the manufacture of coconut rope. Taro (body form of the god Kāne) was kapu for women to cook and prepare. Some large fish were also kapu for women to eat. Isabella Abbott, a leading ethnobotanist of Hawaii, theorizes that because of the limited "noa" (free) diet for Hawaiian women, seaweeds were relied upon more heavily for Hawaiians than other Pacific islands.

The kapu system was used in Hawaii until 1819, when King Kamehameha II, acting with his mother Queen Keōpūolani, his father's other queen Kaʻahumanu, and Kahuna-nui Hewahewa, abolished it by the symbolic act of sharing a meal of forbidden foods with the women of his court. Abolishing the ʻai kapu assured political power to the line of Kamehameha rulers as monarchs because it limited the power of the rulers below them. Originally, it was from this political system that the rulers throughout the island would gain rank, power, and prestige.

== Modern usage ==
The ambiguities in the Polynesian concept (from the English point of view) are reflected in the different senses of the word in different national Englishes: in modern usage in Hawaii, "kapu" is often substituted for the phrase "No Trespassing" on private property signage. Although kapu can be taken to mean "keep out", kapu has a larger meaning to most residents of Hawaii. By contrast, in New Zealand, the comparable word "tapu" is almost always applied in English as meaning "sacred".

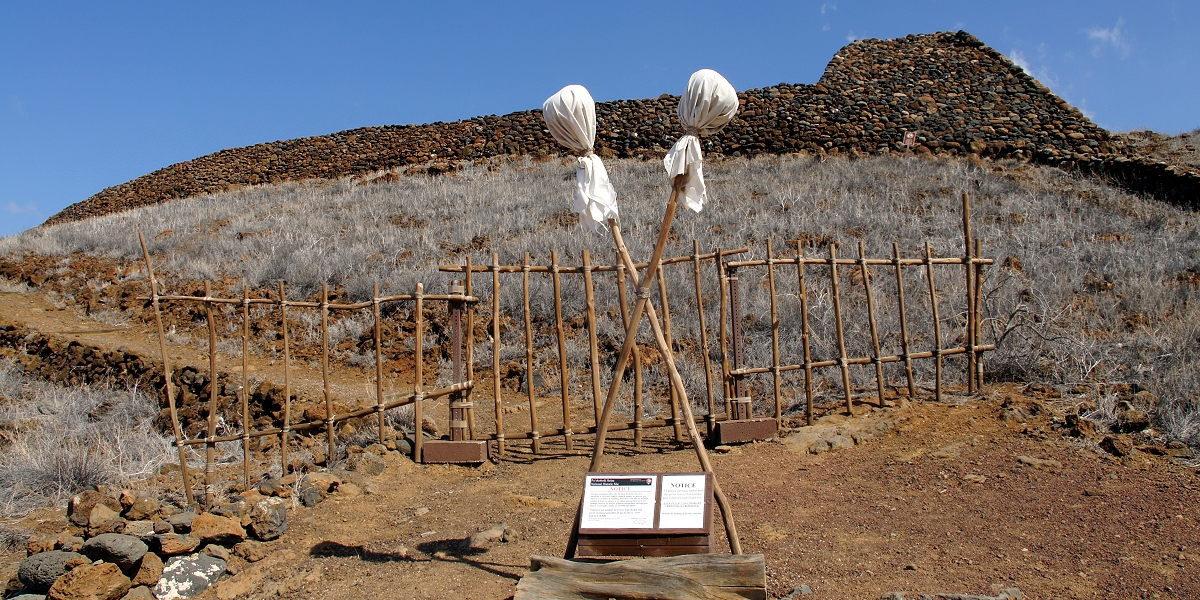
Kapu symbol

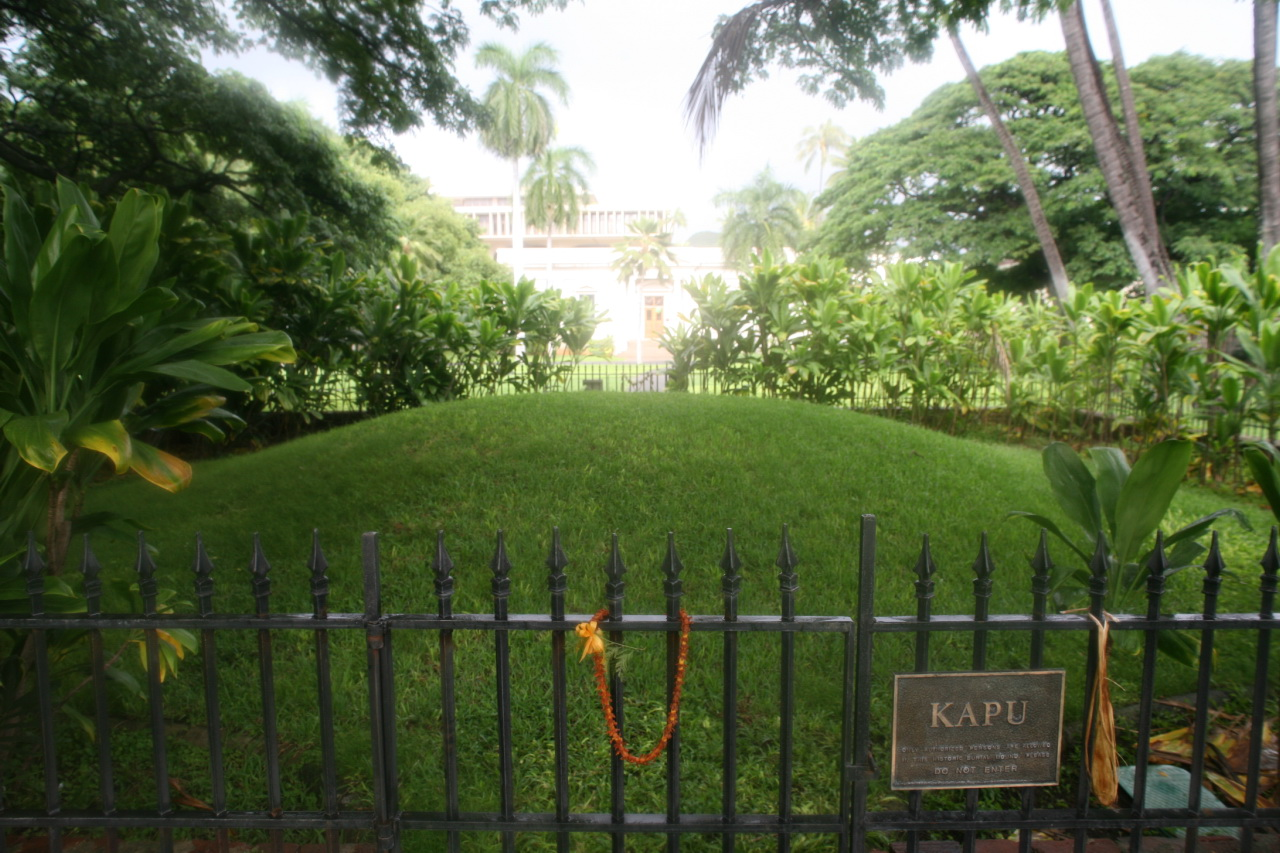
Kapu sign at the burial mound in Iolani Palace

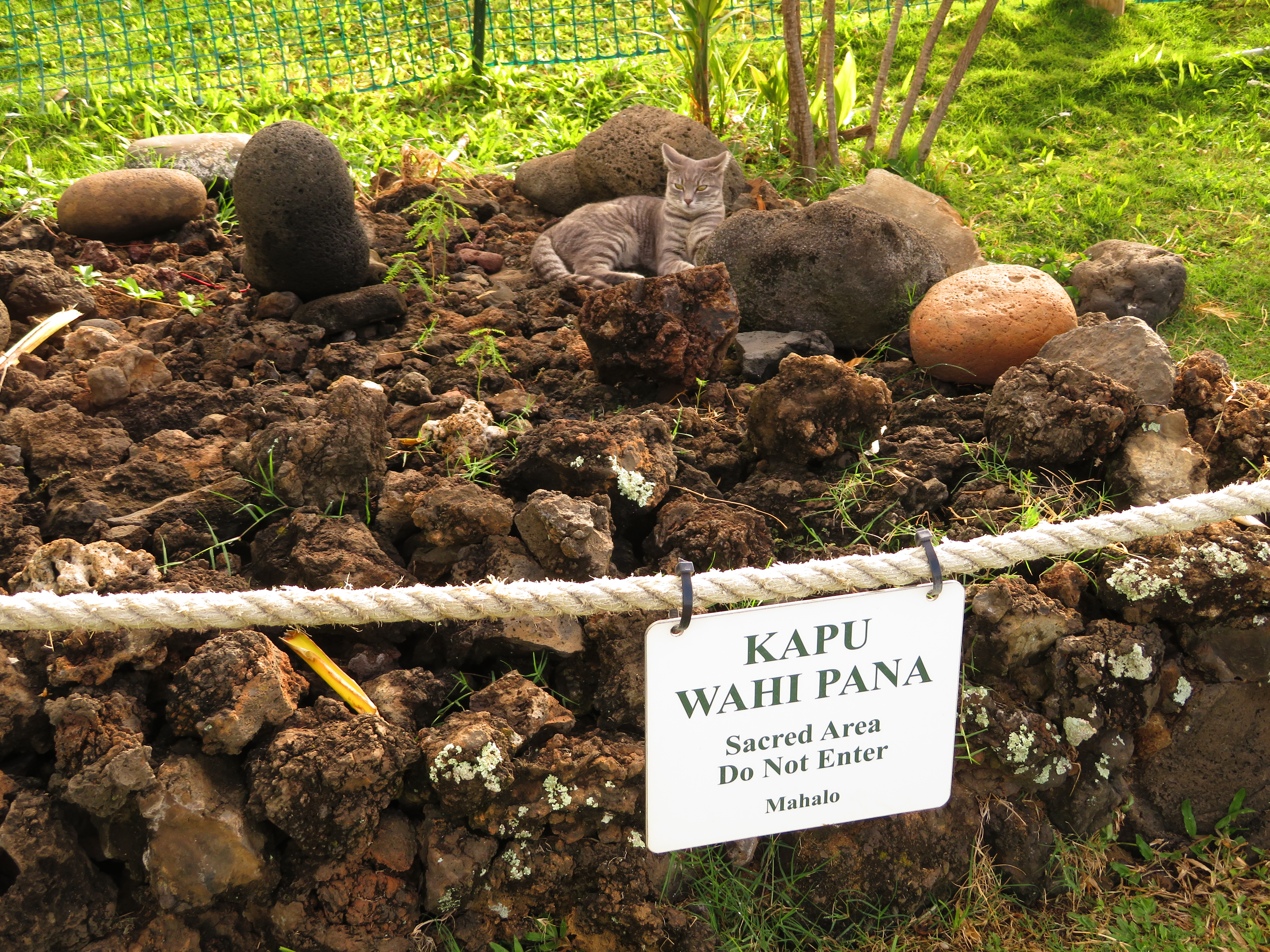
Cat ignoring a kapu

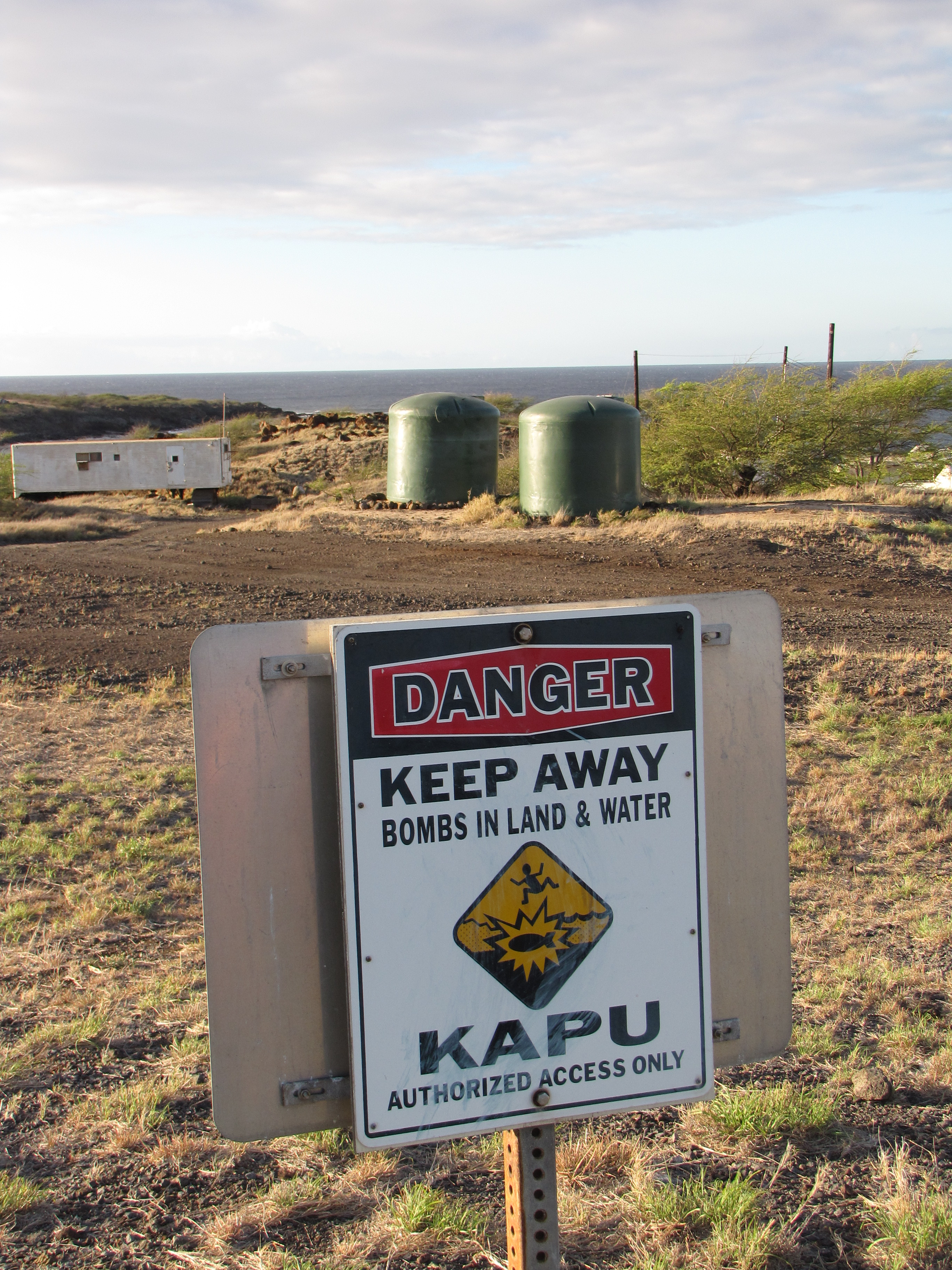
Kapu sign for a mined area

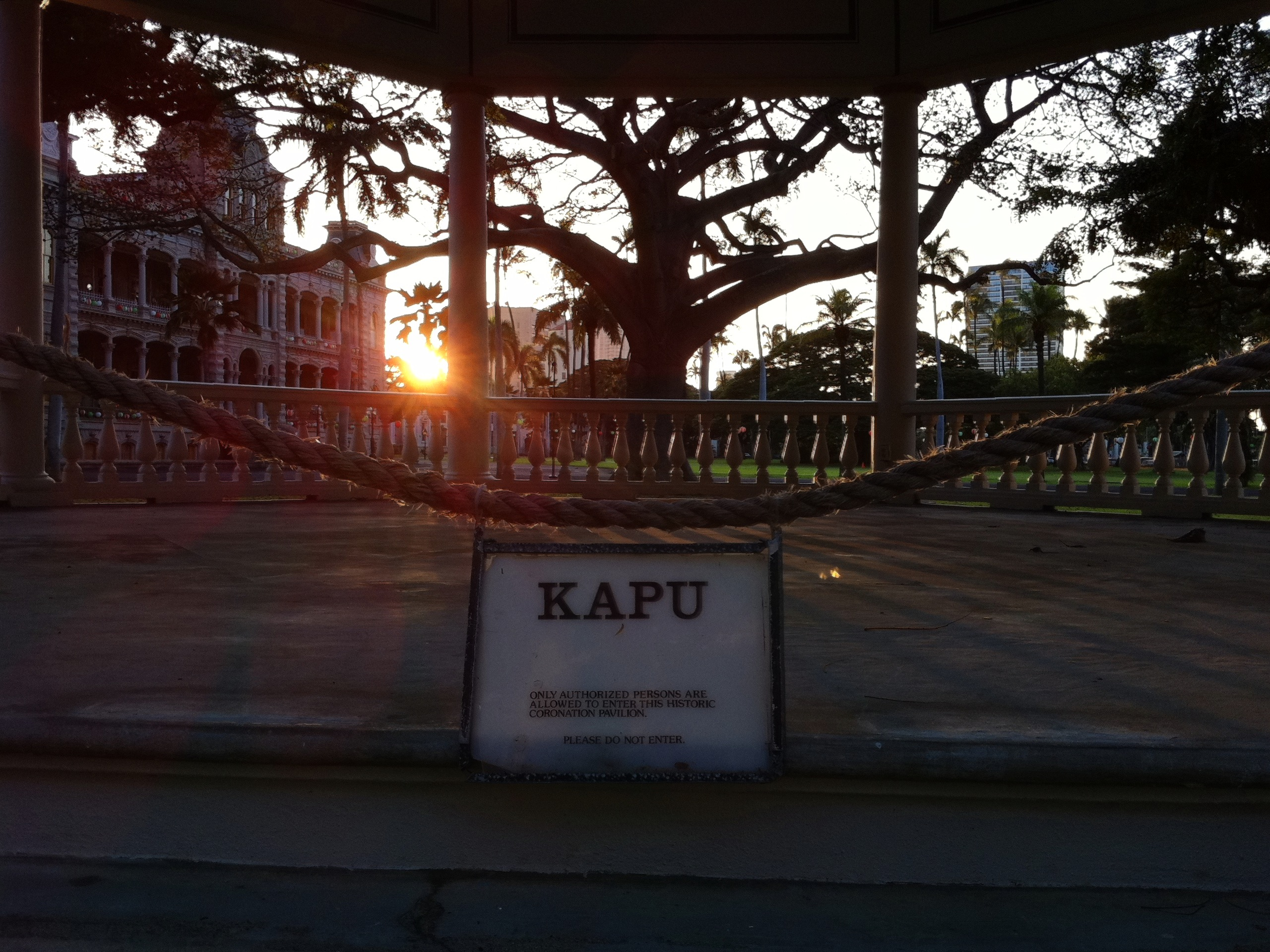
Kapu at the Hawaii Coronation Stand

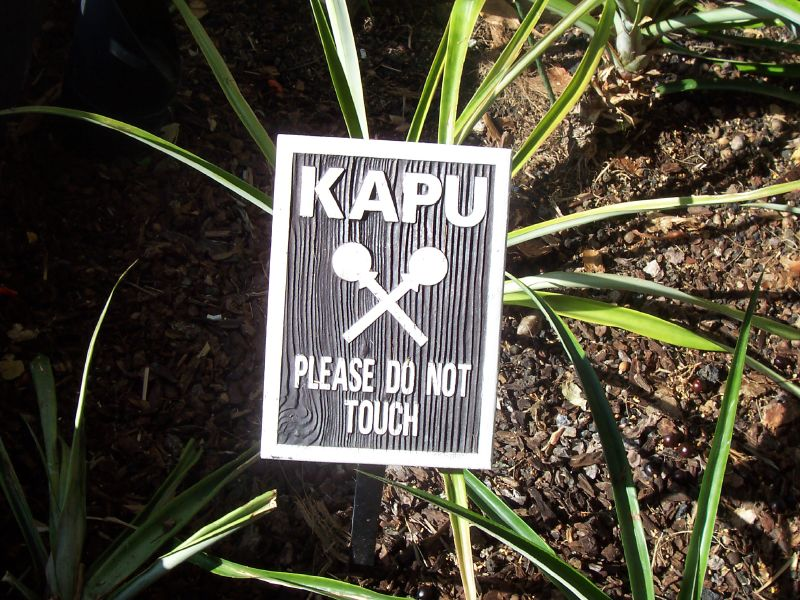
Kapu sign prohibiting from touching a plant

== Terms ==
Some terms using 'kapu':

- ʻaha kapu: the sennit cord put across the portal of a house to signify a ban on entering the house.
- ʻai kapu: the protocol regarding food.
- Hei kapu: The place where priests await messages from the gods.
- Huʻa kapu: the borders of an off-limits place.
- Kapuhili: inherited privileges of chiefs or privileges from the gods
- Kapu ʻili: the crime of wearing someone else's clothing.
- Kapu kai: the ritual purification of bathing in the sea.
- Kapukapu: to be decorous.
- Kapukapu kai: the ritual of lifting a ban by sprinkling sea water.
- Kapu kū mamao: the law on commoners to be separate from the chiefs.
- Kapuku: "to restore life" in Hawaiian.
- Kapu loa: To be strictly forbidden.
- Kapu moe: protocol of prostration.
- Kapu noho: assemblage before the chief.
- Kapuō: the announcement that a procession is approaching.
- Kapo ʻōhi'a ko: the ritual performed before an ohia tree can be logged.
- Kapu puhi kanaka: the rules regarding the killing of people.
- Kapu wohi: protocol exempting from prostration.
- Koʻo kapu: a prohibition enforced by death.
- Pahu Kapu: two crossed staffs, each with a white ball atop.

== See also ==
- Hawaiian religion
- ʻAi Noa
- Treif, a similar concept in Judaism
- Haram, a similar concept in Islam
- Seven deadly sins
- Tapu, a synonym in Samoan, origin of the word "taboo" brought back from South Pacific seafarers
