= Kapa =

Fabric made by native Hawaiians

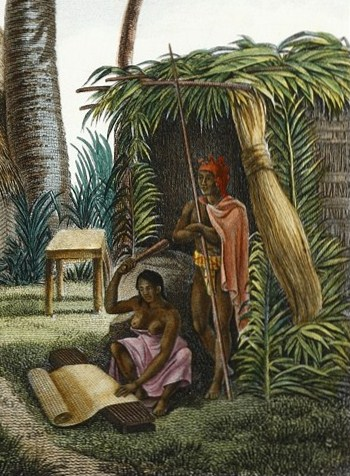
Alphonse Pellion, Îles Sandwich; Maisons de Kraïmokou, Premier Ministre du Roi; Fabrication des Étoffes (c. 1819), Depicting High Chiefess Likelike, the wife of Kalanimoku beating kapa cloth.

Kapa is a fabric made by native Hawaiians from the bast fibres of certain species of trees and shrubs in the orders Rosales and Malvales. The bark is beaten and felted to achieve a soft texture and dye stamped in geometric patterns.

== Description and uses ==
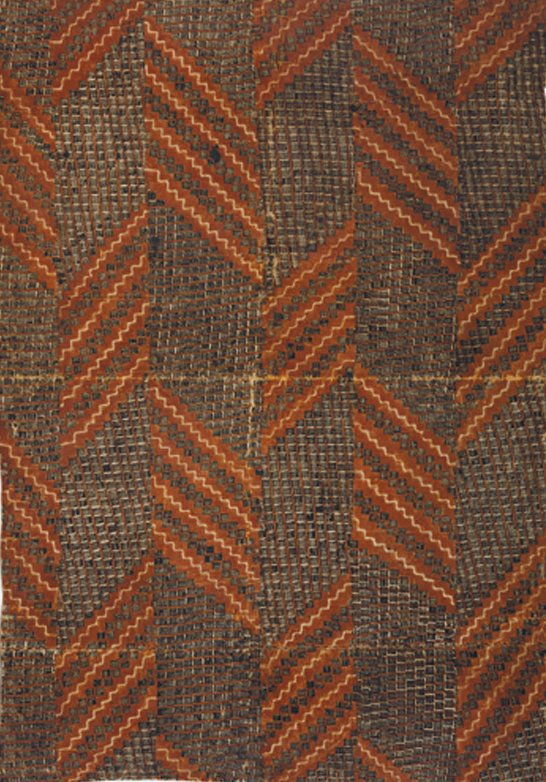
Hawaiian kapa, 18th century, Cook-Foster Collection at Georg-August University in Göttingen, Germany

Similar to tapa found elsewhere in Polynesia (the Hawaiian phoneme /k/ corresponds to /t/ in most other Polynesian languages), kapa differs in the methods used in its creation. Kapa designs primarily consist of creative combinations of linear elements that cross and converge to form squares, triangles, chevrons, and diagonal forms, giving a feeling of boldness and directness. Kapa was used primarily for clothing like the malo worn by men as a loincloth and the pāʻū worn by women as a wraparound. Kapa was also used for kīhei, a shawl or cape worn over one shoulder. Other uses for kapa depended on caste and a person's place in ancient Hawaiian society.

Kapa moe (bed covers) were reserved for the aliʻi or chiefly caste—several layers of kapa would be stitched together at the edges to form a kapa moe. Kapa robes were used by kāhuna or priestly caste. Kapa was also used as banners where leis were hung from it and images of their gods were printed on it.

== Techniques ==
Cultural anthropologists over the course of the 20th century identified techniques in the creation of kapa that are unique to the Hawaiian Islands. Wauke (Broussonetia papyrifera) was the preferred source of bast fibres for kapa, but it was also made from ʻulu (Artocarpus altilis), ōpuhe (Urera spp.), maʻaloa (Neraudia melastomifolia), māmaki (Pipturus albidus), ʻākala (Rubus hawaiensis), ʻākalakala (R. macraei), and hau (Hibiscus tiliaceus). In the 18th century, pieces of kapa were often made of grooving or ribbing. It is done by pushing the dampened cloth into the grooves of a special board. The wauke tree is cut and soaked in water. It is then laid on a kua kūkū (polished stone tablet) and beaten with a hōhoa (rounded beater). After the first phase of beating, the kapa is transferred to a sacred house to be beaten a second time, but in a religious manner.

== Process ==
Each kapa manufacturer used an ʻiʻe kūkū, a beater with four flat sides that were each carved differently. Another way to carve the kapa is by starting on the four-sided affairs, with the coarsest grooves on one side used first in breaking down the bast, or wet bark. Then, the beating continued using two sides with finer grooves. Lastly, finishing touches were accomplished with the remaining smooth side of the beater. The carvings left an impression in the cloth that was hers alone. After the European discovery of the Hawaiian Islands, Western traders travelled to Hawaiʻi especially for kapa.

The process of making kapa was done primarily by women. Young girls would learn by helping their mothers, over time doing the majority of the work, and when older could make kapa by themselves.

== See also ==
- Tapa cloth, similar fabric made elsewhere in Polynesia
