= Kaomi =

Hawaiian royal

Kaomi Moe was the mōʻi kuʻi, aupuni kuʻi (joint king and joint ruler) of the Kingdom of Hawaii with his aikāne King Kamehameha III from 1832 to 1834. He is noted for his resistance to missionary influences in favor of a nation that retained its Hawaiian character, and for his roles in promoting literacy and in perpetuating hula and indigenous medical practices.

== Early life ==
Kaomi was born in Maui on an unknown date early in the 19th century. His father was "Jack" Moe, a native of Bora Bora in Tahiti. His mother was a Hawaiian woman named Kahuamoa who was in the household of Kaʻahumanu, the Kuhina Nui (regent) of the Hawaiian Kingdom following the death of her husband Kamehameha I in 1819.

Kaomi was among the first people in Hawai'i to become literate. He learned to read and write from his uncle Auna, a Tahitian missionary who arrived in Hawai'i in 1822 carrying two small hymnals in the Tahitian language, and appointed Kaomi to be the head of his school when he returned to Tahiti two years later. Kaomi excelled at his studies to the point where American Protestant missionary leader Hiram Bingham invited him to teach reading, writing, and Christian principles to the chiefly followers of Ka‘ahumanu, and to tour the island's establishing prayer-meeting groups. This work played an important role in Hawaiʻi’s early embrace of literacy and widespread education.

Kaomi was knowledgeable in the healing arts. According to Hawaiian historian Samuel Kamakau, "he could tell the symptoms of diseases, had learned from Boki and Ka-ʻoʻo how to diagnose a disease by feeling the body of a patient and [could prescribe] the proper medicine to cure it." Kamakau also remarked that Kaomi was "well-educated and intelligent" and could "tell a funny story entertainingly."

It was through his skill in healing that Kaomi became acquainted with Kamehameha III (Kauikeaouli), the second son of Kamehameha I, who had become King at age twelve when his brother Kamehameha II (Liholiho) died of measles during a trip abroad. Soon the two became aikāne, or intimate friends of the same sex. Such relationships were common and well accepted in early Hawaiian society, and could be sexual, social, and/or political and include sharing responsibilities with family and community. Kaomi had previously been aikāne to Kuakini, royal governor of Hawaiʻi Island, who had himself been aikāne to Kamehameha I.

Although there was gossip that Kaomi had seduced the young king, Kamakou reports that "this was not true for he had shown a fondness for such tempting delights even before Kaomi became his favorite." Ka‘ahumanu, who had become an ardent supporter of the missionaries, tried to stop the relationship by offering Kamehameha III a young chiefess to marry, but he refused, and instead accepted the punishment of building a cattle enclosure for Reverend Bingham.

The missionaries also refused to baptize Kaomi, inspiring him to rebel by forming a group of young men known as the Hulumanu, or bird feathers. Although described by opponents as a cult, they were in fact revivalists who participated in traditional Hawaiian pastimes and spiritual practices that the Church deemed inappropriate.

== The time of Kaomi (Ka wa ia Kaomi) - 1832 to 1834 ==
After Kaʻahumanu died in 1832, Kaomiʻs aikāne relationship with Kamehameha III became official when he was given the title of mōʻi kuʻi, aupuni kuʻi, or joint king and joint ruler. Moʻi is one of the highest titles that an aliʻi may hold, and signaled that Kaomi had a higher royal position than Kīnaʻu, who had succeeded Kaʻahumanu as the Kuhina Nui. As such, Kaomi was entitled to draw upon the kingdom's budget, transfer lands, impose taxes, and distribute clothing and money. The King also placed a taboo on Kaomi's house, and assigned warriors and guards to his service. These actions caused John Papa ʻĪʻī, the Christianized kahu to Kamehameha III and his brother before him, to leave the king because he "would not heed him." The missionaries also refused to acknowledge Kaomi's new title, instead using the derogatory description of "kelii kui" or engrafted king.

In March 1833, a crier was sent through the streets of Honolulu to proclaim the abrogation of all Christian laws and regulations save for the prohibitions against theft and murder. Residents of Oʻahu quickly resumed many of the traditions and pastimes that had been forbidden for the past ten years. ’Ulu maika and pūhenehene (stone games accompanied by gambling) and kite-flying were once again legal; tobacco smoking, tattooing, and drinking were allowed; the Makahiki season could be celebrated with joy; and with the biblical prohibitions on sexual behavior erased, people were free to be intimate with whomever they pleased. As noted by Kamakou: "People poured in from Hawaii, Maui, and Kauai, for on Oahu, the marriage laws were not observed, but on the other islands the rulers were strict in their enforcement…"

The revival of hula, at which Kaomi was a master, was especially rejoiced. Stephen Reynolds, a merchant who lived next door to Kaomi in what is now downtown Honolulu, recalled one celebration: "At daylight the natives assembled in the yard next to mine and had a great dance. The streets, lanes, fences were filled with people to witness one of their former pastimes. The utmost satisfaction appeared to light the countenance of the spectators." The revival of hula was important not just for its value as entertainment, but as a means to preserve histories and honor gods and ancestors.

== Removal and later years ==
The "Time of Kaomi", as the period from 1832 to 1834 later became known, came to an end on the night of March 15, 1834, one year following the repeal of Kaʻahumanuʻs Christian laws. An elderly Christian chief named Kaikioʻewa, together with a servant named Kaihuhanuna, entered Kaomi's house and tied his hands behind his back. Kaomi did not protest, despite his protection by Kamehameha III, and allowed himself to be dragged to Honolulu Fort, where the servant was ordered to club him to death. When Kīnaʻu protested, the King rushed in and fought with Kaikioʻewa to save Kaomi. During this series of events, Kaikioʻewa accused the monarch of abandoning his leadership responsibilities due to his irresponsible self-indulgence in "evil" ways, but the king did not answer him and took Kaomi back to his home at Ka-hale-uluhe, which was declared taboo. Subsequently, Kaomi accompanied Kamehameha III on a circuit of the island, perhaps in an effort to reassert their authority as joint rulers of the Kingdom.

After this, Kaomi ended his relationship with Kamehameha III, left the court, and largely disappeared from Hawaiian history. It has been suggested that Kaomi did so because he recognized the possibility that continuing as aikāne co-rulers risked inciting a civil war and the overthrow or murder of Kamehameha III, thereby destroying any chance of Hawaiʻi becoming an independent nation worthy of international recognition. According to this theory, Kaomiʻs departure “was not an act of cowardice but of bravery, loyalty, and love.”

Little is known of Kaomi’s life after 1834. Some missionaries and Christianized Hawaiian historians, including Hiram Bingham, claimed that he died in poverty and disgrace soon after the abduction. In fact this was not the case, as missionary Sheldon Dibble wrote of meeting Kaomi in Maui three years later and witnessing his death in 1837. Yet other accounts suggest he was briefly exiled in Kauaʻi, then rejoined Kamehameha III at Mokuʻula, the royal compound in Lahaina, Maui.

== Legacy ==
The time of Kaomi represented a revival of Native traditions and resistance against Westernization that became a recurring theme in Hawaiian history, from the Hawaiian Renaissance of King Kalākaua in the 1880s to the second Renaissance of Hawaiian language and culture that began in the 1970s and continues to the present. For over a century, however, most historians presented this period as a warning against the perils of resisting Christian commandments, describing Kaomi as "evil", and the Hawaiian practices he helped revive as "things of darkness." More recently, however, there is renewed attention to Kaomi and in relation to the long-lasting impacts of colonization and the importance of resilience in the face of adversity. Adam Keawe Manalo-Camp, a Native Hawaiian cultural historian, sees Kaomi's journey as "a story of Indigenous resistance, of a kanaka trying to navigate an imposed worldview that sought to erase us." This interest has been reflected in academic papers, a play, art works, and an exhibition at the King Kamehameha V Judiciary History Center.
