= Rhinoceros dolphin =

- An 1837 illustration of the rhinoceros dolphin based on an earlier illustration in 1824.
- A 1741 illustration of a cetacean with two dorsal fins by Italian presbyter Antonio Mongitore.

Scientific classification (Nomen dubium)
- Kingdom: Animalia
- Phylum: Chordata
- Class: Mammalia
- Order: Artiodactyla
- Infraorder: Cetacea
- Family: Delphinidae
- Genus: Delphinus
- Species: D. rhinoceros

Binomial name
- Delphinus rhinoceros (Quoy & Gaimard, 1824)

Synonyms
- Oxypterus mongitori, (Rafinesque, 1814); Oxypterus rhinoceros, (Lesson, 1828); Cetodipterus rhinoceros, (Raynal, 1991)

Alleged species of dolphin

The rhinoceros dolphin (Delphinus rhinoceros) is an alleged species of dolphin first described by French naval surgeons Jean René Constant Quoy and Joseph Paul Gaimard on 19 October 1819, (Note: In Robert Hamilton's The Natural History of the Ordinary Cetacea or Whales (1864-1865), he notes that the sighting occurred instead in October 1809. This directly contradicts Quoy & Gaimard's account, and is consequently a likely mistranslation or mistake.) in the Pacific ocean while sailing between the Sandwich Islands (now the Hawaiian Islands) and New South Wales, Australia (5°28' N). It was formally described in Voyage Autour de Monde, Fait Par Ordere du Roi, a compendium of the scientific observations and accounts of the Uranie voyage around the world under the rule of Louis de Freycinet in 1824. The species is widely considered dubious.

== Morphology and discovery ==
The rhinoceros dolphin was reported to possess a dark overall colouration with sporadic white blotching along the dorsum, which ceased around or soon after the dorsal fin closest to the fluke. The first dorsal fin was located close to or on the neck, and the species' head and face were not visible due to a hesitance to breach, a detail noted as being unlike the other dolphins encountered on the voyage. During interactions with the Uranie, the dolphins passed close to the prow of the vessel, though they did not surface frequently enough to deduce the morphology of any potential beak or snout. The cetaceans were encountered in a pod, and individuals were said to have measured twice the length of a porpoise. Though the specific species of porpoise referenced is not mentioned, if the size comparison were drawn to the common porpoise (Phocoena phocoena), the rhinoceros dolphin would measure close to 3 metres (10 ft) in length. Another two dorsal-finned cetacean resembling a dolphin was sighted breaching and playing amongst common dolphins (Delphinus delphinus) by British naturalist Johnathan Couch in April 1856 off Lantivet Bay, Cornwall, Wales. Couch claimed a maximum length of 2.4 metres (8 ft) for the specimen he purportedly observed.

== Taxonomy and naming ==
The rhinoceros dolphin was named in reference to its frontal dorsal fin, a defining structure located close to or on the neck in superficial resemblance to the horn of a rhinoceros. The species is not known from a type specimen or holotype, and is widely considered to be dubious altogether due to a lack of evidence supporting its existence beyond the description by Quoy and Gaimard. The taxonomic classification Delphinus rhinoceros was suggested by Quoy and Gaimard, placing the species in the same genus as the common dolphin, though this conclusion was founded on little evidence.

Later taxonomic revisions by French naturalist René Lesson in his 1828 book Historie Naturelle Mammiferes place the species instead in the genus Oxypterus, which had been previously used by French naturalist and polymath Constantine Samuel Rafinesque in 1814 to refer to a large odotocete characterised by possessing two dorsal fins that had stranded itself 10 kilometres (6.2 mi) off Licata, Sicily, in September 1741. This specimen, O. mongitore, was said to have measured 13.2 metres (43 ft) in length with a forked tail, a hole in its head that was leaking water, and a mouth equipped with strong teeth by Italian presbyter Antonio Mongitore, who illustrated the specimen along with two other cetaceans, D. dalippus and Physeter urganantus. René Lesson refers to Oxypterus as a "subgenus" that he only gives serious attention to at all in light of the rhinoceros dolphin account. In Cetaceans with two dorsal fins, an article published as part of the seventeenth volume of the Aquatic Mammals journal in 1991, Michel Raynal dismissed this account as a misidentified basking shark (Cetorhinus maximus) rather than a newly undiscovered species of Mediterranean two dorsal-finned cetacean akin to the rhinoceros dolphin. Within the same article, Raynal proposed the hypothetical binomial name for the rhinoceros dolphin Cetodipterus rhinoceros, constituting a new genus within the family Delphinidae.

== Consensus in scientific literature ==
=== In cryptozoology ===
Contemporary discussions of the rhinoceros dolphin occasionally refer to the species as a cryptid, an animal yet to be scientifically recognised due to a lack of substantiated evidence for its existence. It appeared in George M. Eberhart's 2002 book Mysterious Creatures: A Guide to Cryptozoology, where he described it as an "Unknown cetacean of the North Pacific Ocean" and discussed it alongside Couch's account of the two dorsal-finned dolphin spotted off Cornwall.

=== In cetology ===
The rhinoceros dolphin was consistently regarded as a valid species for a short period, being included in cetological publications such as Robert Hamilton's The Natural History of the Ordinary Cetacea or Whales (1864-65) and mammalogist Phillip Hershkovitz's Catalog of Living Whales (1966). This is perhaps due to the fact that the hourglass dolphin (Cephalorhynchus cruciger), then (D. cruciger), was discovered and described by Quoy and Gaimard on the same expedition and was similarly treated as a legitimate species. Unlike the rhinoceros dolphin, the hourglass dolphin remains a valid species that has since been subsequently encountered and photographed, as well as evaluated in the context of conservation. (Note: A third dolphin species, (D. albigena), was also encountered and described on the voyage, though has since been widely absorbed as a junior synonym for the hourglass dolphin.)

It has been proposed that the rhinoceros dolphin was a misidentification on Quoy and Gaimard's part, and that the description of two dorsal fins matched the profile of a mother and calf swimming tightly together and causing their silhouettes to overlap. Alternatively, the sighting may have been of a pod of any of the various species of beaked whale, many of which were not well known at the time of the encounter. Both Cuvier's and Blainville's beaked whales, Ziphius cavirostris and Mesoplodon densirostris respectively, possess dark bodies with white or light grey mottling of various intensities between individuals, and are known to travel in small groups of mothers and calves.

In the event that the rhinoceros dolphin does constitute a new species, the presence of a second dorsal fin is neither precluded by theoretical morphology nor evolutionary accessibility. Raynal notes that the presence of a second fin is entirely within the realms of cetacean biology due to the nature of dorsal fin structure as a protrusion comprising connective tissue and the biological function they serve as stabilisation while swimming. The existing diversity among cetaceans in dorsal stabilisation biomechanisms, including phenotypic characteristics such as singular dorsal fins, no dorsal fins, or dorsal ridges, suggest that the exhibition of a second dorsal fin is not entirely impossible, though it has not yet been found to exist among valid taxa.

== See also ==
- Cryptid whale – Cetaceans claimed to exist
- Delphinus minimus – Dubious species of dolphin
- Giglioli's whale – Alleged two dorsal-finned cetacean
