= Delphinus minimus =

- An artistic reconstruction of D. minimus based on René Lesson's account.

Scientific classification (Nomen dubium)
- Kingdom: Animalia
- Phylum: Chordata
- Class: Mammalia
- Order: Artiodactyla
- Infraorder: Cetacea
- Family: Delphinidae
- Genus: Delphinus
- Species: D. minimus

Binomial name
- Delphinus minimus Lesson & Garnot, 1827

Dubious species of dolphin

Delphinus minimus, sometimes contemporarily referred to as Lesson's dolphin, is an alleged species of dolphin said to have been observed by French naturalists René Lesson and Prosper Garnot off the Solomon Islands on the 2nd and 10th of August, 1825. Due to a lack of subsequent evidence supporting its ongoing existence or existence at all, the species is now considered dubious.

== Sightings and morphology ==
D. minimus was sighted on two separate occasions on the 2nd and 10th of August, 1825 by Lesson and Garnot on their voyage around the world aboard La Coquille. Spotted near the Moluccas (now Maluku Islands) off the coast of the Solomon Islands, the species was encountered in pods of thousands and individually did not exceed 2 ft (60 cm) in length. The dolphins swam in "two lines forming a checkerboard formation". The two sightings were first described in detail in Lesson's multi-volume zoological work Compléments de Buffon (1838), written after the passing of Georges Louis-Leclerc, Comte de Buffon, an influential French naturalist who authored Histoire Naturelle (1749–1804), an encyclopedic collection of 18th century zoological discoveries. Lesson describes the dolphins as being brown in colour with only a white spot at the tip of their slender beaks.

== Taxonomy ==
Lesson and Garnot described the dolphins as D. minimus, placing the new species in the genus Delphinus alongside the common dolphin (D. delphis). The binomial name was first assigned to the species in French naval officer Louis-Isidore Duperrey's 1827 compendium of the voyage of La Coquille, Voyage autour du monde: exécuté par ordre du roi, sur la corvette de Sa Majesté, where the parent authority is credited to Lesson and Garnot. In subsequent publications and catalogues, the parent authority is often credited solely to Lesson.

== Scientific consensus ==
No type specimen or holotype for the species exists, and in 19th century and early 20th century cetological literature, D. minimus was often noted to have been described solely via observation at sea. In catalogues released by the British Museum in 1850 and 1866, D. minimus was listed alongside other now dubious species that had been described at sea, such as D. rhinoceros, D. albigena, (Note: D. albigena has largely been resolved as a junior synonym for the hourglass dolphin (Cephalorhynchus cruciger).) D. leucocephalus and D. maculatus, the latter two of which were also described by Lesson aboard La Coquille. During this period, the species was largely considered to be a valid taxon likely as a result of Lesson's reliability as a naturalist and the existing number of species he had already described of which most had proven to be valid at this point. Frank E. Beddard's 1900 book A book of whales contests the legitimacy of D. minimus, noting that "more facts are needed before this most dwarfish of Cetacea can be admitted". In a June 2021 paper on cetacean taxonomy published by NOAA, Thomas A. Jefferson notes that the identity of the species cannot be reliably ascertained. He concludes that D. minimus is dubious because no known dolphin species is as small as Lesson describes when fully grown, and because the lack of illustrative evidence detracts from its validity.

== See also ==
- Cryptid whale
