= Kamakahonu =

Historic Place in Hawaii County, Hawaii

- Kamakahonu, Residence Of King Kamehameha I
- U.S. National Register of Historic Places
- U.S. National Historic Landmark
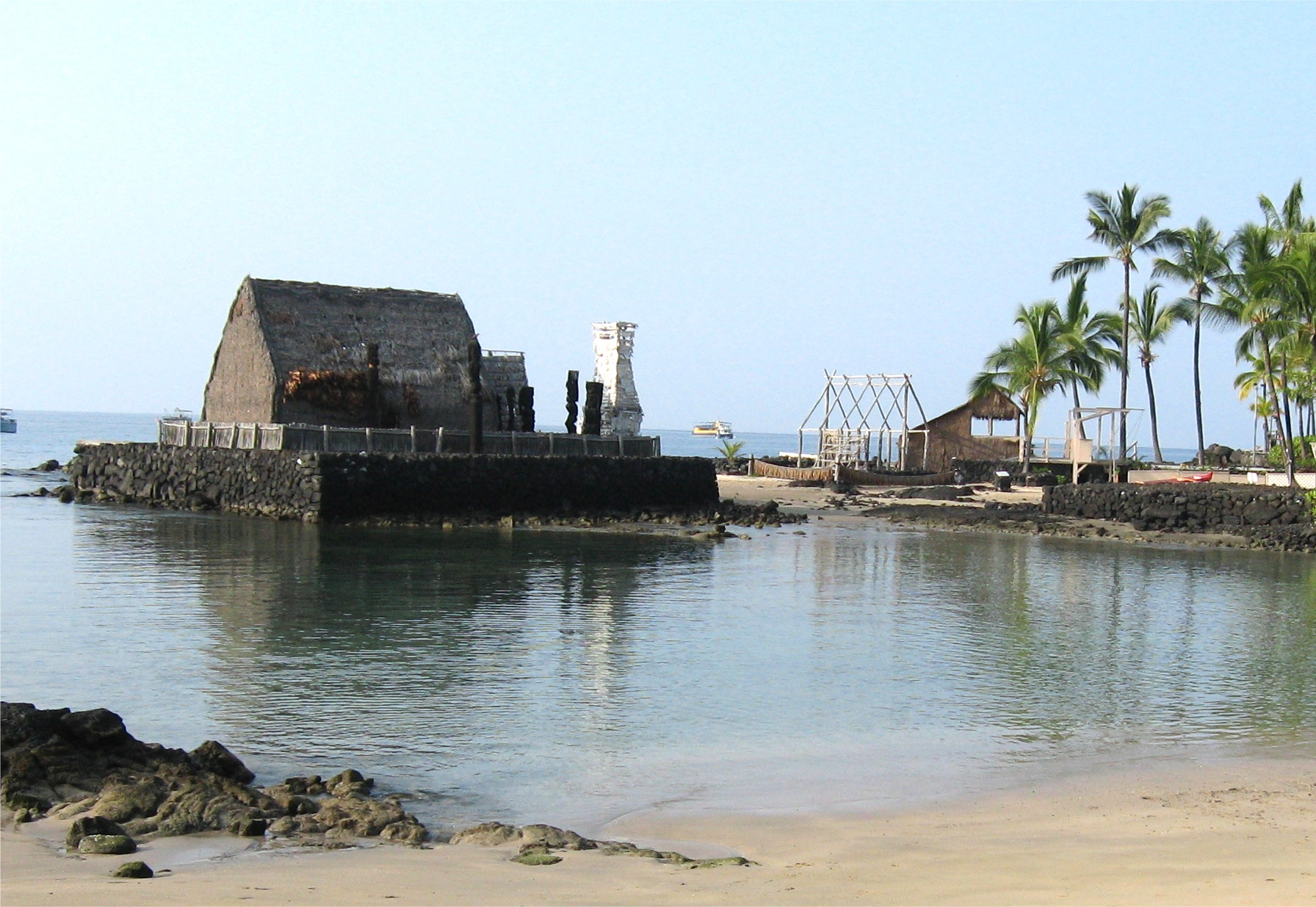
- ʻAhuʻena Heiau

- Location within Hawaii
- Location: 75-5660 Palani Road, Kailua-Kona, Hawaii
- Coordinates: 19°38′20.42″N 155°59′51.31″W
- Area: 3.5 acres (1.4 ha)
- Built: 1812
- NRHP reference No.: 66000288

Significant dates
- Added to NRHP: October 15, 1966
- Designated NHL: December 29, 1962

Kamakahonu, the residence of Kamehameha I, was located at the north end of Kailua Bay in Kailua-Kona on Hawaiʻi Island.

== History ==
Kamehameha I (also known as Kamehameha the Great), who unified the Hawaiian Islands, lived out the last years of his life and instituted some of the most constructive measures of his reign (1810–1819) here. The residential compound included the personal shrine, ʻAhuʻena heiau, of the King. The name means "temple of the burning altar" in the Hawaiian language.

His son, the crown prince Liholiho, also lived here, taking the name Kamehameha II. In December 1819, Kalanimoku led an army from here to put down the rebellion of his nephew Kekuaokalani, in the Kuamoʻo Battle, a few miles to the South. A battery of 18 cannons and large stone walls protected the fortress-like enclosure around several houses.

Island Governor "John Adams" Kuakini lived at Kamakahonu. He governed the island when the king was away on state affairs to another island and later when the capitol was moved to Lahaina on the island of Maui in 1820. He later built a Western-style house called Huliheʻe Palace on the other side of the beach for entertaining visitors. The bay was called Kaiakeakua in ancient times meaning "sea of the god", but is now called Kailua Bay.

The name ka maka honu means "the turtle eye" in the Hawaiian Language, after a rock in the shape of a turtle that was located to the left of the present beach. It was here, within a year of the Kamehameha's death, that the first American Christian missionaries to the Hawaiʻi arrived on April 4, 1820. The rock where Asa Thurston and Hiram Bingham I landed was later called the "Plymouth Rock of Hawaii".

== Today ==
The point to the north was called Kūkaʻilimoku, which means Kū, the thief of the islands, was named for the war god Kū honored by Kamehameha I. It is now the site of the Kailua lighthouse.

The property is now part of King Kamehameha's Kona Beach Hotel; none of the houses or walls remain. ʻAhuʻena heiau was reconstructed in the 1970s and can be viewed, but not entered. Some artifacts can be viewed in the hotel lobby, including a feather cloak and helmet (mahiole). The small sandy beach provides a protected beach for launching canoes, and children swimming. The hotel was built on the property in 1960, and was replaced with a new building in 1974. In 2009, the hotel was renovated, and a museum and cultural center were added. The hotel is operated by Courtyard Marriott.

The famous rock was covered over by construction of the pier, and much of the beach was destroyed to construct a seawall for Aliʻi drive in the 1950s. Cattle pens on the pier were used until 1966. When the deeper harbor was built at Kawaihae cargo traffic moved there. This area is the start and finish of the Ironman World Championship Triathlon.

== Gallery ==
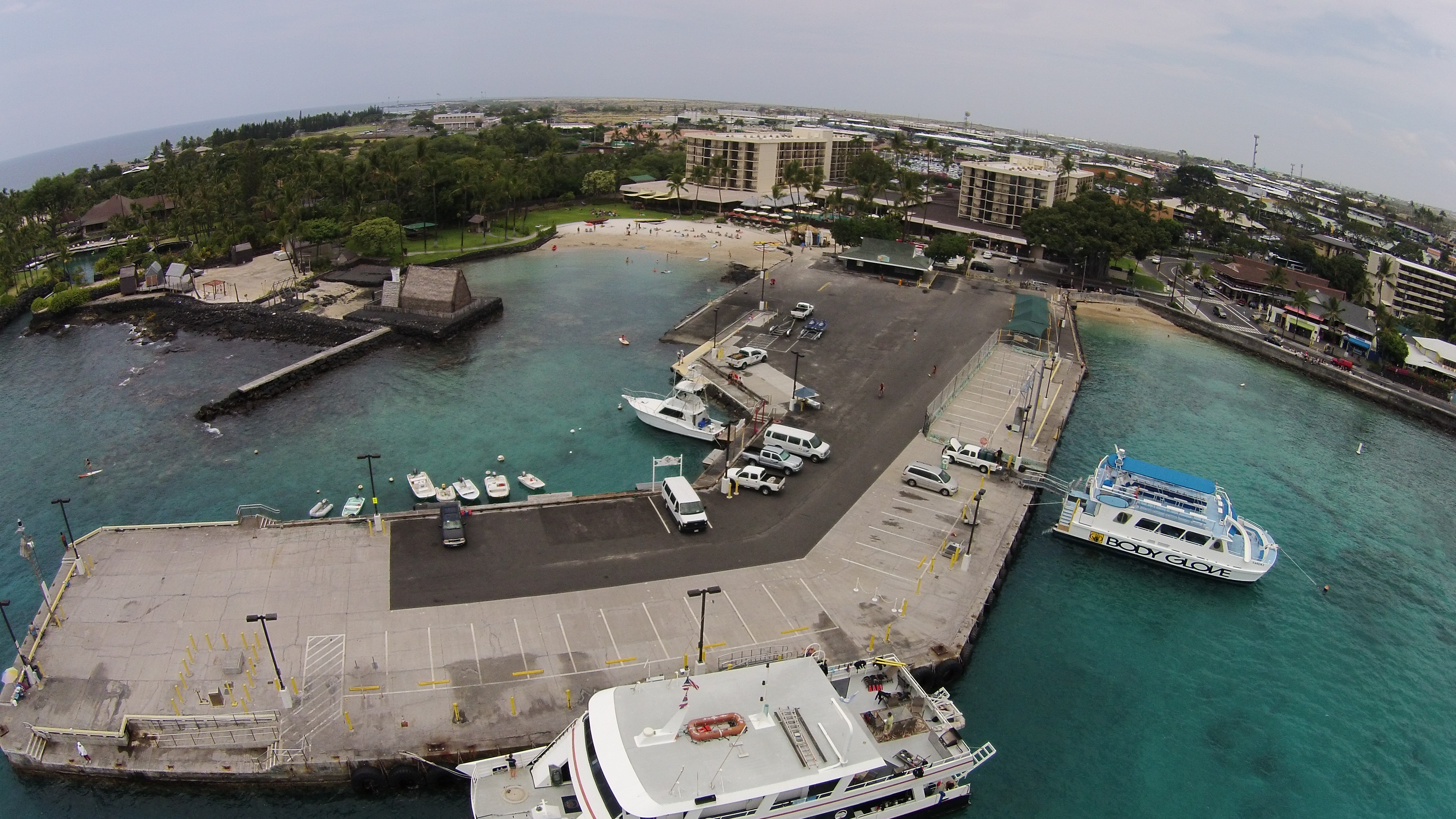
Aerial view of Kamakahonu, pier & beach.

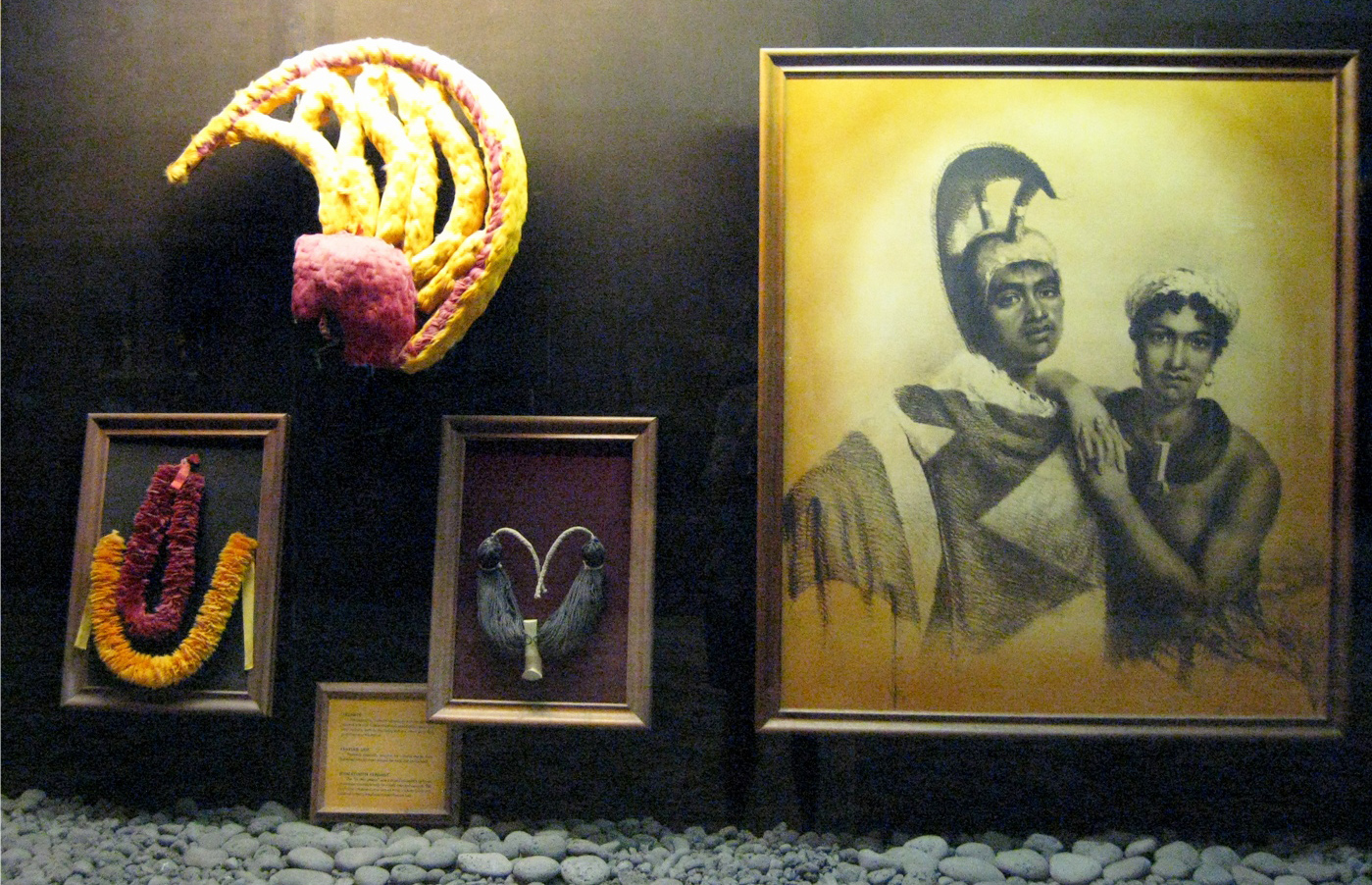
Artifacts on display in the lobby.

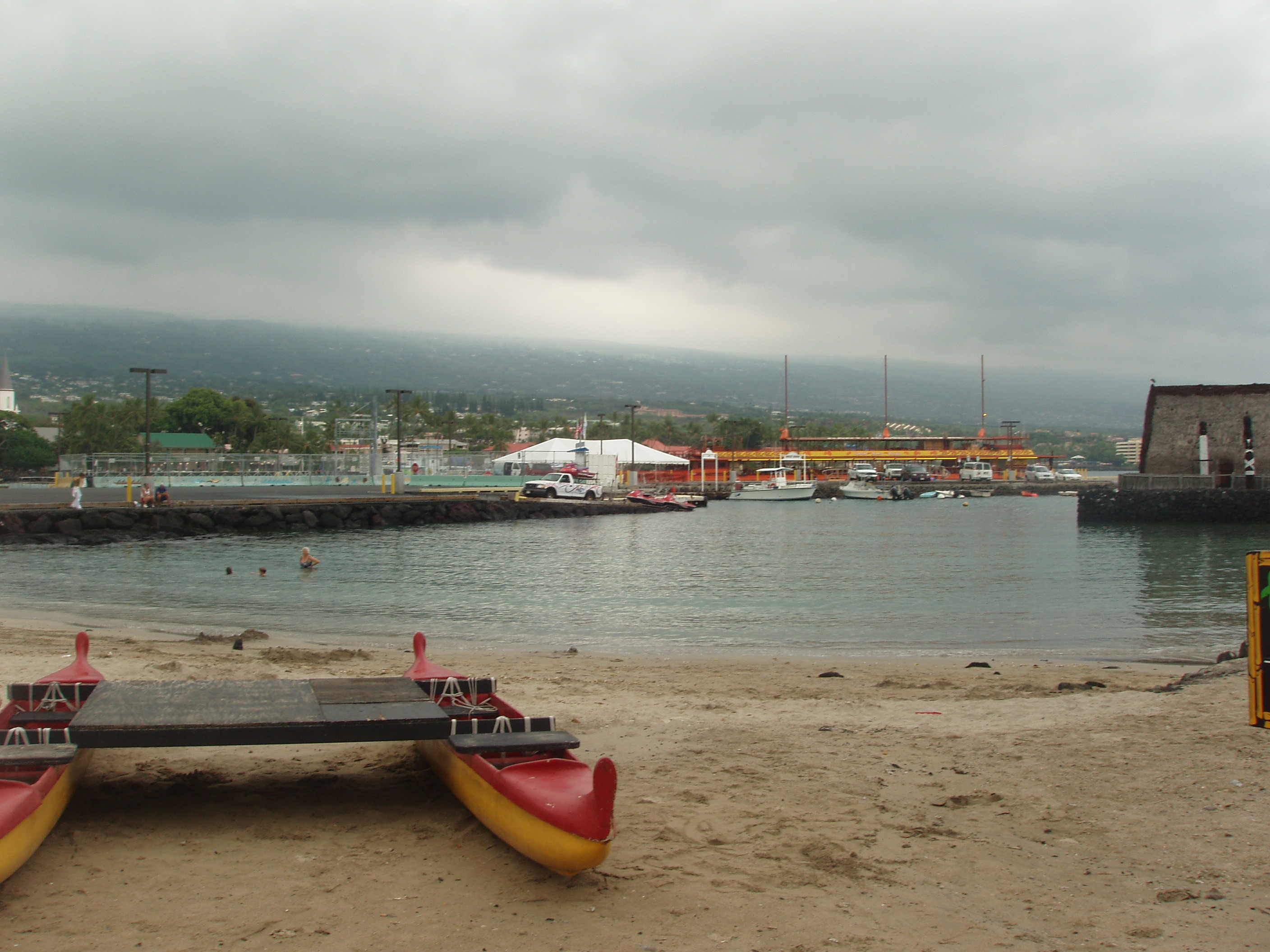
The small beach is protected by the pier.

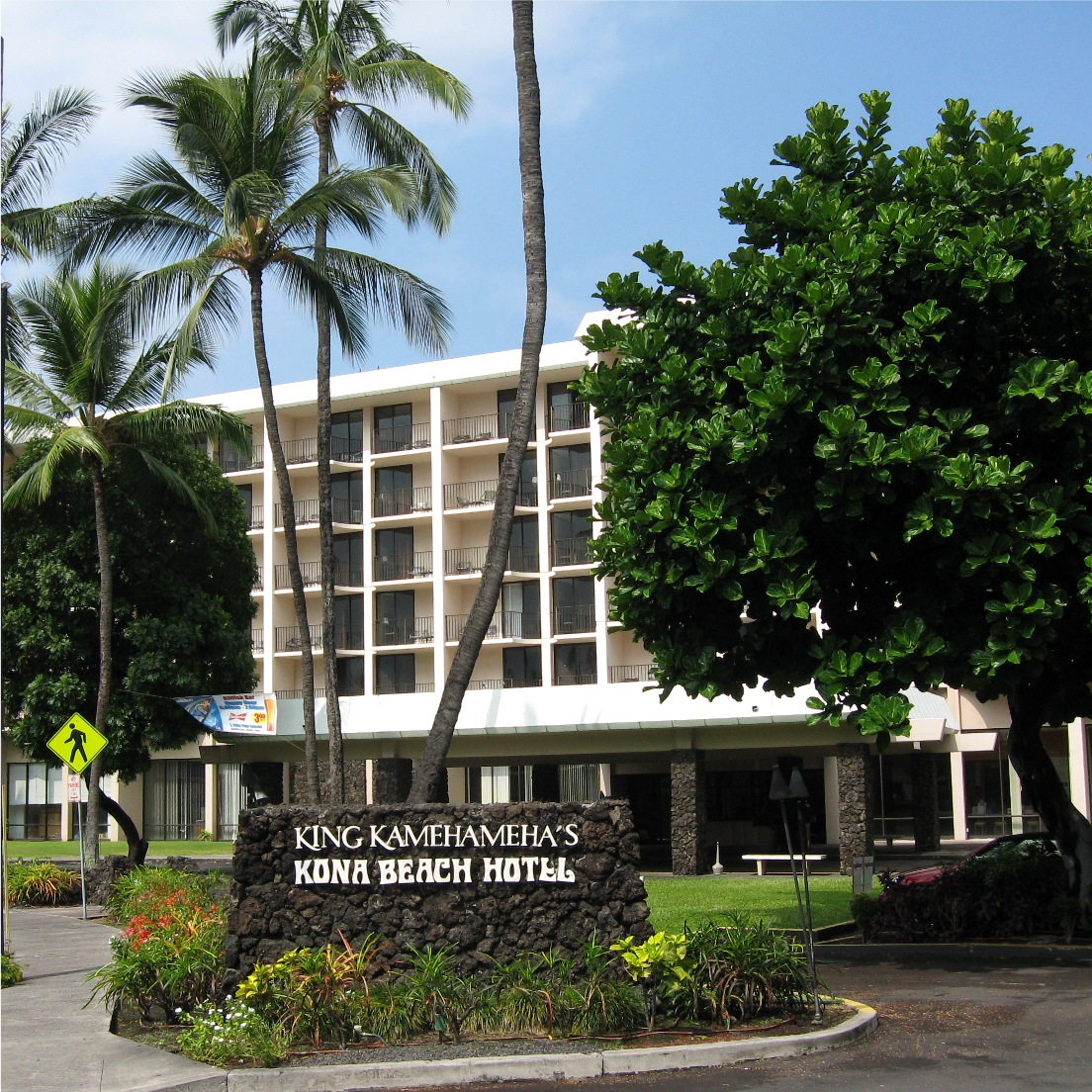
King Kamehameha's Kona Beach Hotel now occupies the site.

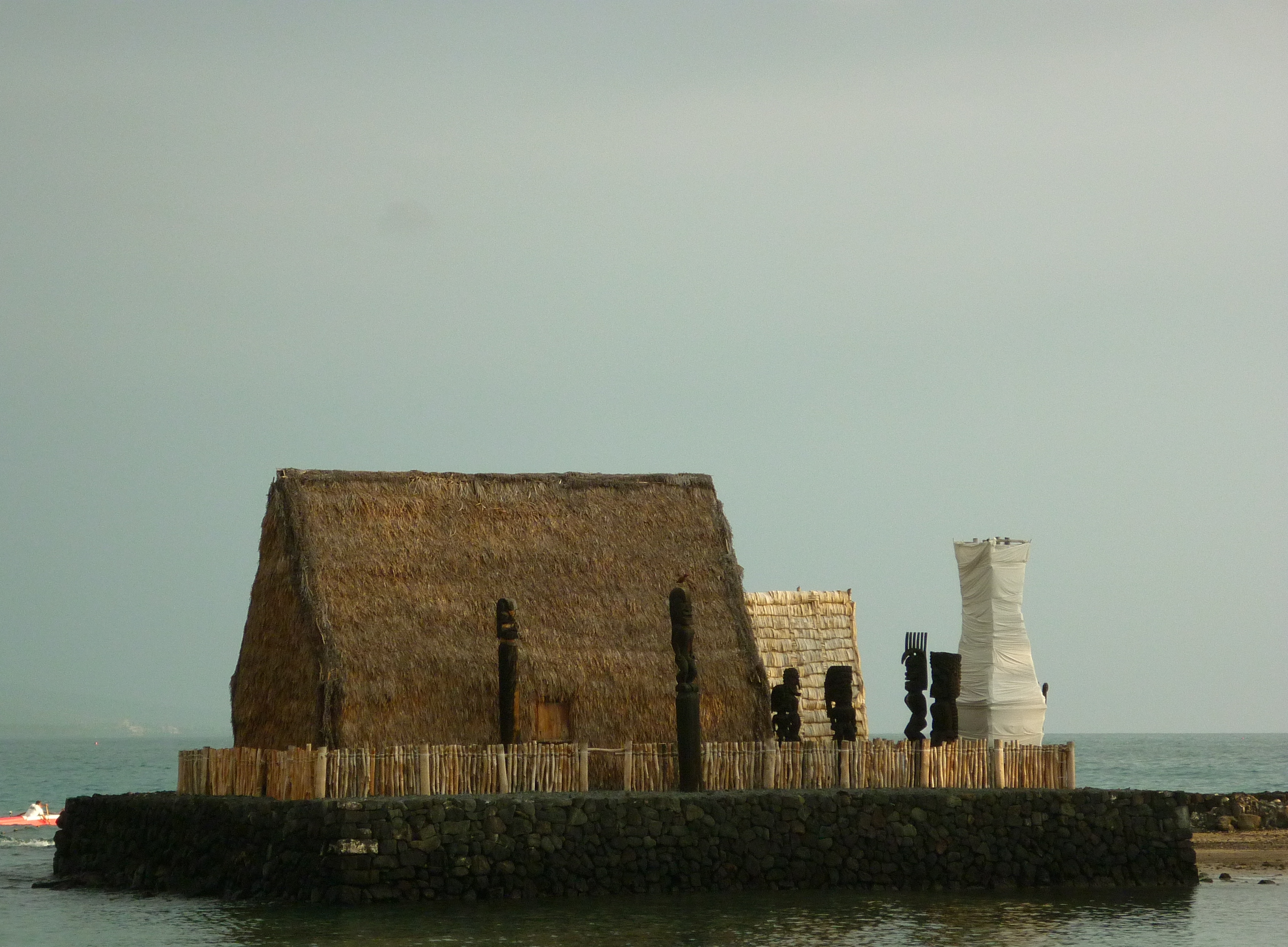
Kamakahonu - Kamehameha I's hale at twilight. (10/2012)
