= Moe aikāne =

Sexual relationships in pre-colonial Hawai'i

In pre-colonial Hawaiʻi, moe aikāne (pronounced [ˈmo.e əj.ˈkaː.ne]) was an intimate relationship between partners of the same gender, known as aikāne. These relationships were particularly cherished by aliʻi nui (chiefs) and the male and female kaukaualiʻi performing a hana lawelawe or expected service with no stigma attached. There were several Hawaiian terms to describe aikāne including hoʻokamaka and noho ai (a poetic form that translates to ‘one to lie with’).

Moe aikāne were celebrated in many moʻolelo (legends and history), including the Pele and Hiʻiaka epics. Most of the major chiefs, including Kamehameha I, had moe aikāne. Lieutenant James King stated that "all the chiefs had them" and recounts a tale that Captain Cook (the first European explorer to Hawaii) was asked by one chief to leave King behind, considering such an offer a great honor. Kamehameha III was aikāne to Kaomi Moe, whom he elevated to the position of mōʻi kuʻi, aupuni kuʻi (joint king and joint ruler) and played an important role in perpetuating hula and other indigenous traditions and promoting literacy.

David Samwell, the surgeon aboard Cook’s ship, wrote in his journals in January of 1779: “Of this class [of aikane] are Palea and Kanekoa, and their business is to commit the Sin of Onan [oral sex] upon the old King [Kamehameha I]. This, however strange it may appear, is fact, as we learnt from the frequent Enquiries about this curious Custom, and it is an office that is esteemed honourable amoung them.”

A number of Cook's crew related tales of the tradition with great disdain. American adventurer and sailor John Ledyard commented in detail about the tradition as he perceived it. The relationships were official and in no way hidden. The sexual relationship was considered natural by the Hawaiians of that time.

The word and social category of aikāne refers to: ai or intimate sexual relationship; and kāne or male/husband. In traditional moʻolelo or chants, women and goddesses (as well as aliʻi chiefs) referred to their female lovers as aikāne, as when the goddess Hiʻiaka refers to her female lover Hōpoe as her aikāne. During the late 19th and early 20th century, the word aikāne was "purified" of its sexual meaning by colonialism, and in print meant simply friend, although in Hawaiian language publications its metaphorical meaning could mean either friend or lover without stigmatization.

Among men, the sexual relationships usually begin when the partners are teens and continue throughout their lives, even though they also maintain heterosexual partners. These relationships are accepted as part of the history of ancient Hawaiian culture. While moe aikāne might be thought of as an example of a nominally heterosexual community accepting homosexual and bisexual relationships, author Kanalu G. Terry Young states in his book Rethinking the Native Hawaiian Past that these relationships were not bisexual in a social sense. These were relationships from the ʻōiwi wale times that held no stigmatism to the person's ʻano (one's nature or character).

Moe aikāne is distinct from māhū, a traditional Hawaiian term referring to individuals who have dual male and female spirit.

== See also ==
- LGBT rights in Hawaii
- Māhū, Hawaiian word for “third gender”
- Takatāpui, a similar concept in Māori culture
