= Likelike (wife of Kalanimoku) =

High chiefess and member of the royal family during the Kingdom of Hawaiʻi (died 1821)

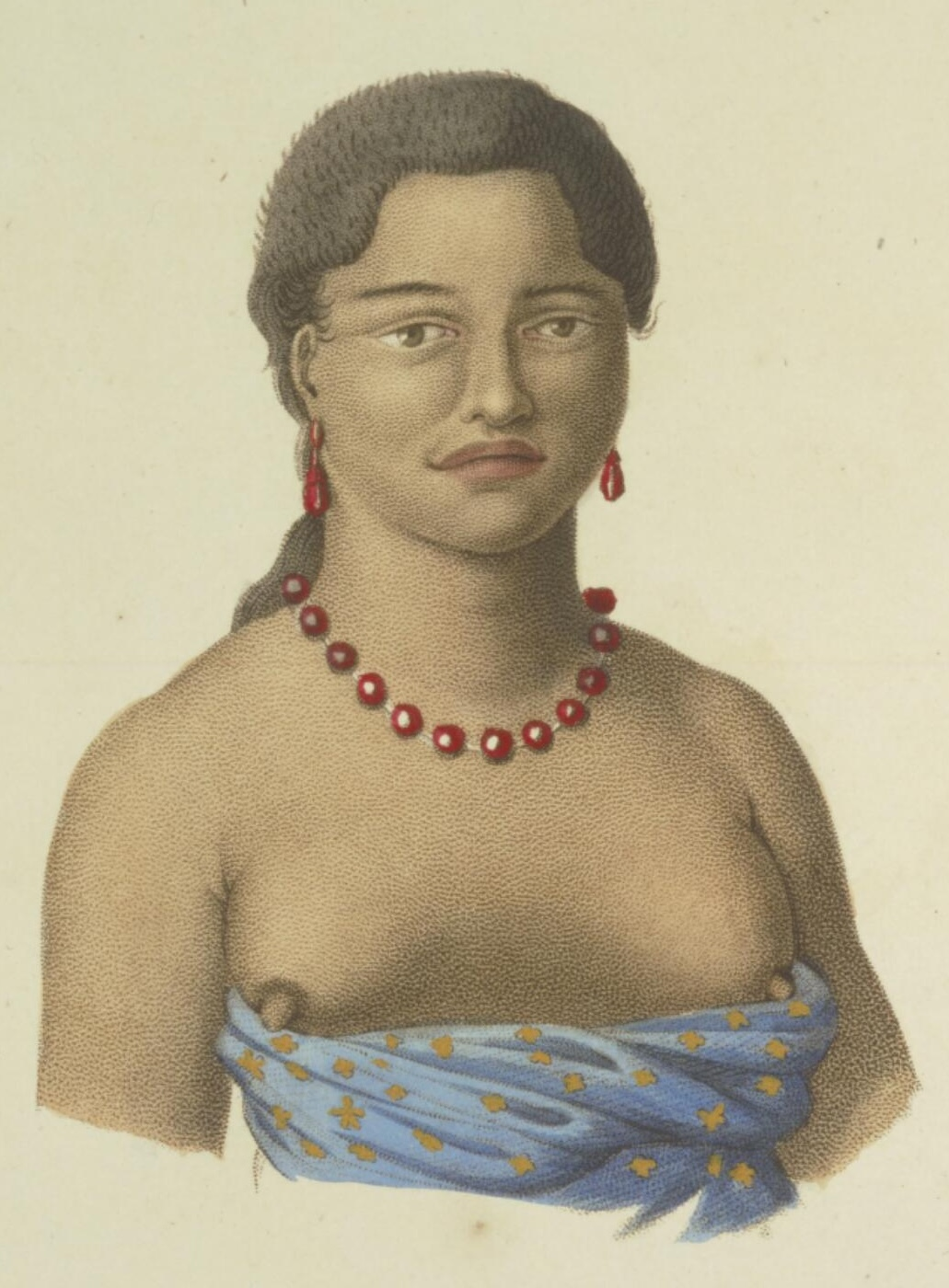
- Rikériki, femme du chef Kraïmokou, part of an engraving by J. Alphonse Pellion
- Died: March 4, 1821; Honolulu, Oahu
- Burial: unknown
- Spouse: Boki; Kalanimoku
- Issue: Lanihau
- Father: Kaikioʻewa
- Mother: Nahaukapu

Likelike (Hawaiian pronunciation: [likeːlikeː]; died March 4, 1821) was a high chiefess and member of the royal family of the Kingdom of Hawaii. Before the standardization of the Hawaiian language, her name was sometime written as Rikériki. She was the favorite wife of Prime Minister Kalanimoku, a powerful chief and statesman during the early years of the Hawaiian monarchy, and she would accompany him on his interactions with visiting Western explorers and American missionaries to Hawaii. Likelike and her newborn son Lanihau died shortly after the baby’s birth due to the shock caused by cannons fired to celebrate the royal birth. Her funeral was conducted under traditional Hawaiian customs with the exception of a Christian sermon, which was the first performed on a Hawaiian royal.

== Family and marriage ==
Likelike was born to High Chief Kaikioʻewa and his wife Nahaukapu. She was considered a kaukau aliʻi, a chief of lower-ranking descent, but was also a distant relative of King Kamehameha I on her father's side. A supporter of King Kamehameha I during his conquest of the Hawaiian Islands, her father Kaikioʻewa was descended from the ruling family of Hawaii Island. He served as the kahu (guardian or caretaker) of the young Kamehameha III when the king was a child and later presided as Governor of Kauai. Her mother was descended from the semi-legendary chief Kahaoʻi from the island of Oahu.

Likelike was married first to High Chief Boki, the eventual Governor of Oahu. However, sometime after their marriage, Boki's elder brother Kalanimoku took Likelike as his wife. Kalanimoku, called The Iron Cable of Hawaii because of his political savvy and military prowess, served as Prime Minister during the reigns of the first three kings of Hawaii. In retaliation, Boki took the chiefess Kuini Liliha from his nephew Kahalaiʻa Luanuʻu, her previous husband. The manner in which the men "took" Likelike and Kuini Liliha as wives is not explained in detail in the contemporary sources. Kalanimoku had many other wives including Likelike’s half-sister Kuwahine, but Likelike was regarded as his favorite wife.

== Interactions with foreigners ==
In May 1819, King Kamehameha I died, leaving the throne to his son Kamehameha II. In August that year, the French corvette Uranie under Captain Louis de Freycinet visited the Hawaiian Islands during its circumnavigation expedition. When the Uranie landed on Kawaihae, on the island of Hawaii, Likelike accompanied Kalanimoku to his meeting and feast with the explorer. Because of the ʻai kapu (taboo) which prohibited men and women from eating meals together, Likelike was not allowed to dine at the same table with Kalanimoku and the captain, as well as others. She remained on deck eating scraps brought up to her, but after her husband finished and left the table, she took his place at the table with the rest of the diners. Freycinet observed she "made up for the temporary restraint that had been forced upon her by swallowing several glassfuls of brandy one after the other with remarkable gusto". On August 14, Kalanimoku was baptized in the Roman Catholic faith by ship chaplain Abbé de Quélen while anchored off of Lāhainā, Maui, then the capital of Hawaii. It is not noted if Likelike was on board during the ceremony.

J. Alphonse Pellion, an artist aboard the Uranie, made several engraving sketches of the Hawaiians who visited the ship, including one of Likelike titled Rikériki, femme du chef Kraïmokou (above). He sketched two other chiefesses: Queen Kamāmalu (Kamahamarou), the favorite wife of Kamehameha II, and Keōuawahine (Kéohoua), the wife of Kuakini, Governor of the island of Hawaii. Some of his sketches also depicted traditional signs of mourning such as head shaving and body marking for the recently deceased king.

Freycinet's wife Rose de Freycinet, who accompanied him on the expedition, gave a brief description of Likelike after meeting her: "This woman is quite young and has a rather pleasant face; she is less corpulent than the other women I have encountered, and the scantiness of her clothing is less shocking."

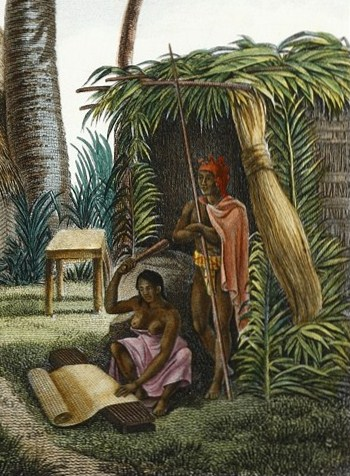
J. Alphonse Pellion, Îles Sandwich; Maisons de Kraïmokou, Premier Ministre du Roi; Fabrication des Étoffes, c. 1819. A domestic scene of Likelike beating kapa cloth with her husband standing over her

After the arrival of the American Protestant missionaries in 1820, Kalanimoku allowed Reverend Elisha Loomis to set up a mission school in Kawaihae on the island of Hawaii where Likelike became a student of the new faith. Loomis's wife Maria Loomis recounted how the chiefess professed her love of the palapala (Bible). Under the reign of the new King Kamehameha II, the court had moved away from his father's former seat of Kailua-Kona, Hawaii Island at the end of 1820 and passed by Lāhainā before transitioning to Honolulu, on the island of Oahu in the early part of 1821.

Leaving Kawaihae, Likelike and Kalanimoku also moved along with the rest of the royal court although the couple would precede the king to Oahu due to Likelike’s pregnancy. According to Loomis, Likelike was reportedly looking forward to continue her missionary education at the mission in Honolulu where Hiram Bingham preached. With much fanfare and cannon fire, the king arrived aboard his new royal yacht Haʻaheo o Hawaiʻi into the port of Honolulu, on February 3, 1821.

== Death and funeral ==
During her travel to Honolulu, Likelike was heavily pregnant with Kalanimoku's child and close to giving birth. On February 25, 1821, she gave birth to a son who they named Lanihau (meaning "cool heaven"). Kalanimoku and his brother Boki set off cannons and muskets all over Honolulu in celebration, announcing the birth of the child to the public. In their descriptions of the incident, the American missionaries blamed the common people for being overzealous in setting off the cannon salutes, which was a popular custom adopted after the introduction of western firearms to the islands. Bingham reported that "two hundred pounds of powder" were consumed, much of it set off within the proximity of the grass hut where the newborn and the mother were residing. According to the writings of Bingham and Loomis, Lanihau died within twenty-four hours from the shock and Likelike died from a fever soon afterward on March 3, at the Honolulu Fort.

Bingham who visited Likelike with another missionary described the last days of the chiefess:

Two of us, repairing to the place, found the poor, sinking Likelike shrieking and writhing, in the agonies of death, beyond the reach of human skill or help. Oh, how different the death of a heathen from that of the Christian! What horror appeared to hang over the grave! For four nights in succession, at her earnest solicitation, her friends had carried her out and immersed her, to cool the burning fever, with the hope of prolonging her life till her husband should arrive. But now the hour of her departure had come. Boki, who had called us to sit near her, finding that her breath had ceased, and every sign of life was gone, turned his face upwards, and set up the loud heathen wail, which soon became general and deafening, from a multitude of voices. We retired from the crowd, while some stood wringing their hands in anguish, crying with loud and lamentable tones and cadences, while floods of tears ran down their swarthy faces.

The death of the young chiefess was greatly mourned by the Hawaiian people. Her funeral, which took place over several days, featured the traditional Hawaiian funerary practices including wailing, hula dancing, and mourners shaving their hair in grief. Bingham and other American missionaries beseeched the king and Oahu’s Governor Boki to stop the funerary hula on the Sabbath, a day of rest in the Christian tradition, wishing to conduct a Christian funeral, but they were denied. Although the missionaries were unable to stop the traditional mourning rituals, Kalanimoku allowed a sermon to be given by Bingham at Kalanimoku’s house on the Sabbath. It was the first Christian sermon given for the funeral of a Hawaiian royal. The sermon was given in English so it had to be translated into Hawaiian for Kalanimoku and the common people in attendance to understand. According to Bingham, Kalanimoku “asked if his departed wife had gone to heaven”. Likelike's burial was conducted in the traditional manner with her bones preserved, her flesh torn from them and cast into the sea.

Her namesake was Princess Likelike (1851–1887), a younger sister of King Kalākaua and Queen Liliʻuokalani, who gave her name to the Likelike Highway on Oahu.

== Bibliography ==
- Bingham, Hiram (1855) [1848]. A Residence of Twenty-one Years in the Sandwich Islands (Third ed.). Canadaigua, NY: H. D. Goodwin. OCLC 557953377.
- Day, Arthur Grove (1984). History Makers of Hawaii: a Biographical Dictionary. Honolulu: Mutual Publishing of Honolulu. ISBN 978-0-935180-09-1. OCLC 11087565.
- Del Piano, Barbara (2009). "Kalanimoku: Iron Cable of the Hawaiian Kingdom, 1769–1827". Hawaiian Journal of History. 43. Honolulu: Hawaiian Historical Society: 1–28. hdl:10524/12237.
- Forbes, David W., ed. (1998). Hawaiian National Bibliography, Vol 1: 1780–1830. Honolulu: University of Hawaii Press. ISBN 978-0-8248-2042-8. OCLC 123279964.
- Freycinet, Louis de; Kelly, Marion (1978). Hawaií in 1819: A Narrative Account. Honolulu: Department of Anthropology, Bernice Pauahi Bishop Museum. OCLC 4827597.
- Freycinet, Rose Marie Pinon de; Rivière, Marc Serge (2003). A Woman of Courage: The Journal of Rose de Freycinet on Her Voyage Around the World, 1817–1820. Canberra: National Library Australia. ISBN 978-0-642-10767-1. OCLC 249133238.
- Kam, Ralph Thomas (2017). Death Rites and Hawaiian Royalty: Funerary Practices in the Kamehameha and Kalakaua Dynasties, 1819–1953. S. I.: McFarland, Incorporated, Publishers. ISBN 978-1-4766-6846-8. OCLC 966566652.
- Kamakau, Samuel (1992) [1961]. Ruling Chiefs of Hawaii (Revised ed.). Honolulu: Kamehameha Schools Press. ISBN 0-87336-014-1. OCLC 25008795.
- Kamakau, Samuel (1993). Tales and Traditions of the People of Old, Nā Moʻolelo a ka Poʻe Kahiko. Honolulu: Bishop Museum Press. ISBN 9780930897710. OCLC 24919592.
- Kameʻeleihiwa, Lilikalā (1992). Native Land and Foreign Desires. Honolulu: Bishop Museum Press. ISBN 0-930897-59-5. OCLC 154146650.
- Kuykendall, Ralph Simpson (1965) [1938]. The Hawaiian Kingdom 1778–1854, Foundation and Transformation. Vol. 1. Honolulu: University of Hawaii Press. ISBN 0-87022-431-X. OCLC 47008868.
- Loomis, Albertine (1951). Grapes of Canaan: Hawaii 1820. Honolulu: Hawaiian Mission Children's Society. OCLC 16169947.
- McKee, Ruth Eleanor (1934). The Lord's Anointed: A Novel of Hawaii. Garden City, NY: Doubleday, Doran & Co. OCLC 1162497.
- Pukui, Mary Kawena; Elbert, Samuel H.; Mookini, Esther T. (1974). Place Names of Hawaii. Honolulu: University of Hawaii Press. ISBN 978-0-8248-0524-1. OCLC 1042464.
- Smith, Bradford (1956). Yankees In Paradise The New England Impact On Hawaii. Philadelphia: Lippincott. OCLC 1439742.
