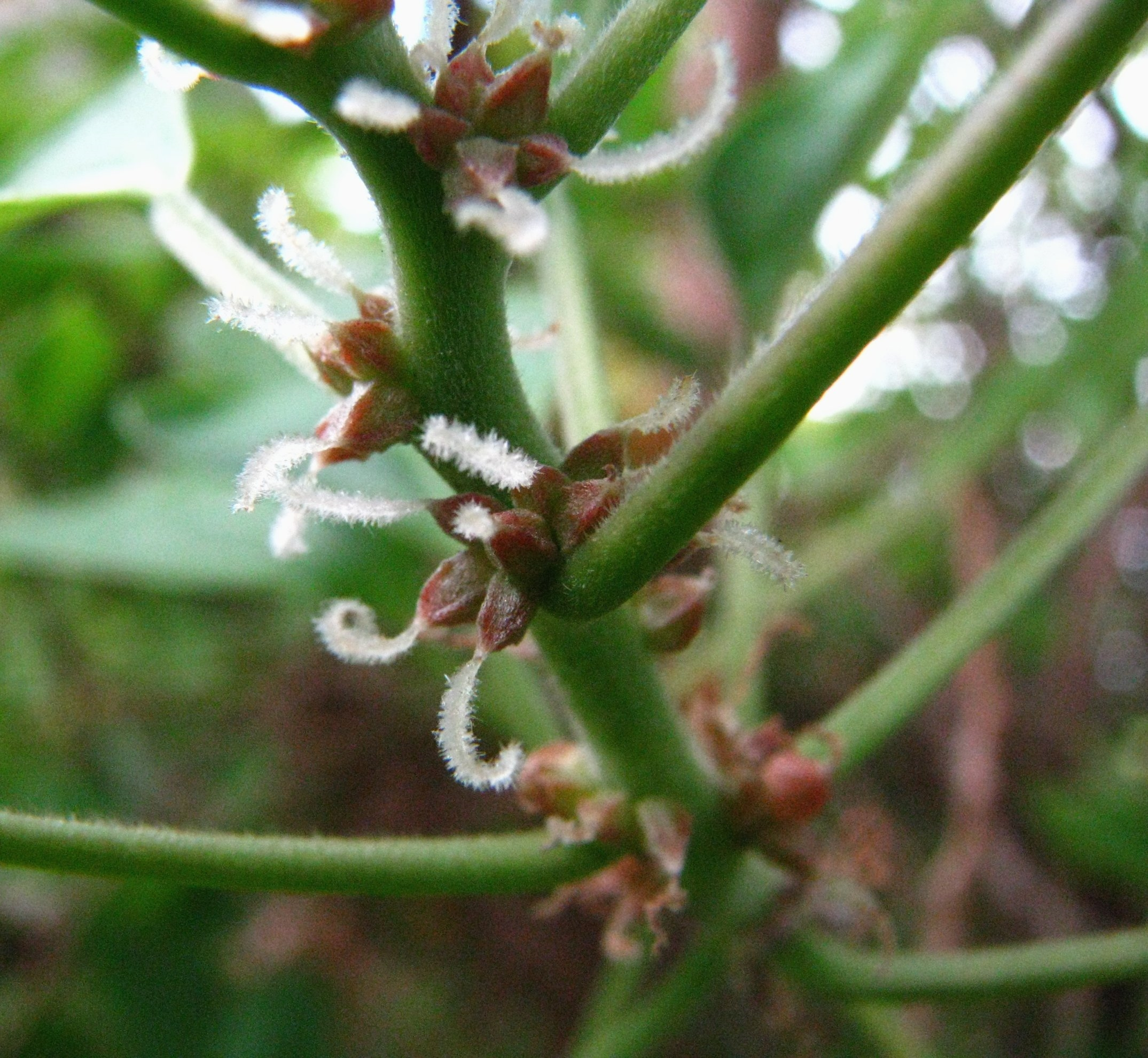
- Cultivated Neraudia angulata, pistillate flowers

Scientific classification
- Kingdom: Plantae
- Clade: Tracheophytes
- Clade: Angiosperms
- Clade: Eudicots
- Clade: Rosids
- Order: Rosales
- Family: Urticaceae
- Tribe: Boehmerieae
- Genus: Neraudia; Gaudich.

= Neraudia =

Genus of flowering plants

Neraudia is a genus of plants in family Urticaceae. All five species are endemic to Hawaii. Ma'oloa is a common name for these plants.

Five species are accepted.

- Neraudia angulata R.S.Cowan
- Neraudia kauaiensis (Hillebr.) R.S.Cowan
- Neraudia melastomifolia Gaudich.
- Neraudia ovata Gaudich.
- Neraudia sericea Gaudich.
