= Kalanimoku =

Chief Minister of Kingdom of Hawaiʻi (c. 1768–1827)

William Pitt Kalanimoku
- Chief Minister of Kingdom of Hawaii
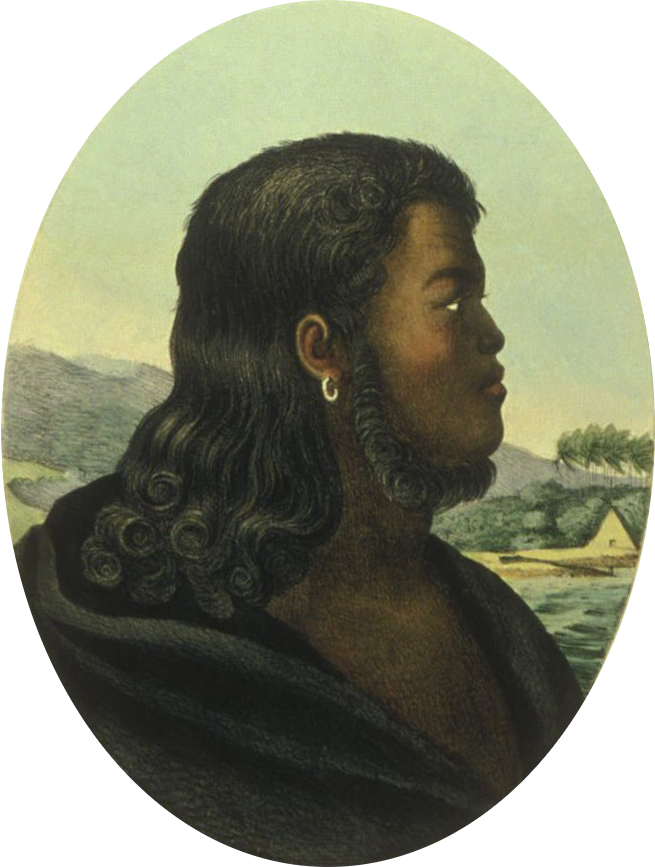
- From a painting by Louis Choris
- Born: c. 1768; Maui
- Died: February 7, 1827 (aged 58–59); Kamakahonu
- Spouse: Kiliwehi; Kuwahine; Likelike ʻAkahi
- Issue: William Pitt Leleiohoku I
- Father: Kekuamanoha
- Mother: Kamakahukilani

William Pitt Kalanimoku or Kalaimoku (c. 1768 – February 7, 1827) was a High Chief who functioned similarly to a prime minister of the Hawaiian Kingdom during the reigns of Kamehameha I, Kamehameha II and the beginning of the reign of Kamehameha III. He was called The Iron Cable of Hawaiʻi because of his abilities.

== Life ==
Kalanimoku was born at Kauiki, Maui, circa 1768. His father was Kekuamanoha and his mother was Kamakahukilani, the niece of his father. Through his father he was a grandson of Kekaulike, the King or Moʻi of Maui. Through his mother he was great-grandson of Kekaulike. He was cousin of Kaʻahumanu, Kaheiheimālie, and Namahana Piʻia, Kamehameha's three wives; Kuakini, later served as Governor of Hawaii; and Keʻeaumoku II, later served as Governor of Maui. His siblings included Boki, later served as Governor of Oʻahu; Kahakuhaʻakoi Wahinepio, later served as Governor of Maui, and Manono II, the wife of Keaoua Kekuaokalani. Both his sisters were at one time wives of Kamehameha I.

Kalanimoku came to Hawaii in the entourage of his aunt Kalola and his cousin Kīwalaʻō shortly before 1782. He was captured by Kamehameha’s forces at the Battle of Mokuohai where Kīwalaʻō was defeated. However, Kalanimoku was spared from death by the intercession of the king and came under his service.

At the time, his name was often spelled Karaimoku by Hawaiians and contemporaries alike, and even Kalanimoku, himself, signed his name as such. Other spellings were Kalaimoku, Crymoku or Crimoku. He adopted the name William Pitt after his contemporary the Prime Minister of Great Britain, William Pitt the Younger. He was frequently addressed as Mr. Pitt or Billy Bitt. He served as Kamehameha I's chief minister and treasurer succeeding his uncle Keʻeaumoku Pāpaʻiahiahi. He had great natural abilities in both governmental and business affairs. He was well liked and respected by foreigners, who learned from experience to rely on his words. He was called "the iron cable of Hawaiʻi" because of his abilities.

Kalanimoku had many wives including Kiliwehi, Kuwahine, Likelike and Akahi. Historian Samuel Kamakau and American missionary Hiram Bingham I recounted an incident in 1805 when Kalanimoku burned down much of Honolulu and the island of Oahu after Kuwahine deserted him for Kuakini. The burning and destruction of property, which was sanctioned by Kamehameha I, did not cease until she was found and returned to him.

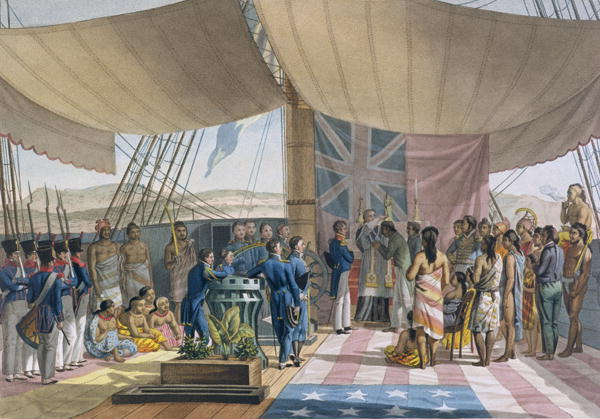
Baptism on Uranie in 1819

In 1819, he was baptized a Roman Catholic aboard the French ship Uranie, in the presence of Kuhina Nui (Premier) Kaʻahumanu and King Kamehameha II. The event depicted in a watercolor by ship's artist Jacques Arago (1790—1855), who wrote and illustrated accounts of the Hawaiian Islands during Freycinet expedition.

Kalanimoku led an army against the revolt of Kekuaokalani in December 1819 in the successful battle of Kuamoʻo.

He served as regent along with Queen Kaʻahumanu while Kamehameha II traveled to London in 1823, and to Kamehameha III after Kamehameha II's death in 1824.

In his later years his vision dimmed and one of his eyes was defective. He suffered from dropsy through 1826 and the disease became alarming in the following year. He died at Kamakahonu (the old home of Kamehameha I) in Kailua Kona, Hawaii Island on February 7, 1827. He had only one son, William Pitt Leleiohoku I, who married Ruth Keʻelikōlani and had their only son John William Pitt Kīnaʻu, who died while still a teenager.

== Bibliography ==
- Bingham, Hiram (1855) [1848]. A Residence of Twenty-one Years in the Sandwich Islands (Third ed.). Canadaigua, NY: H. D. Goodwin. OCLC 557953377.
- Del Piano, Barbara (2009). "Kalanimoku: Iron Cable of the Hawaiian Kingdom, 1769–1827". Hawaiian Journal of History. 43. Honolulu: Hawaiian Historical Society: 1–28. hdl:10524/12237.
- Fornander, Abraham (1880). Stokes, John F. G. (ed.). An Account of the Polynesian Race: Its Origins and Migrations, and the Ancient History of the Hawaiian People to the Times of Kamehameha I. Vol. 2. London: Trubner & Company. OCLC 4823096. Archived from the original on June 29, 2016.
- Kamakau, Samuel (1992) [1961]. Ruling Chiefs of Hawaii (Revised ed.). Honolulu: Kamehameha Schools Press. ISBN 0-87336-014-1. OCLC 25008795.
