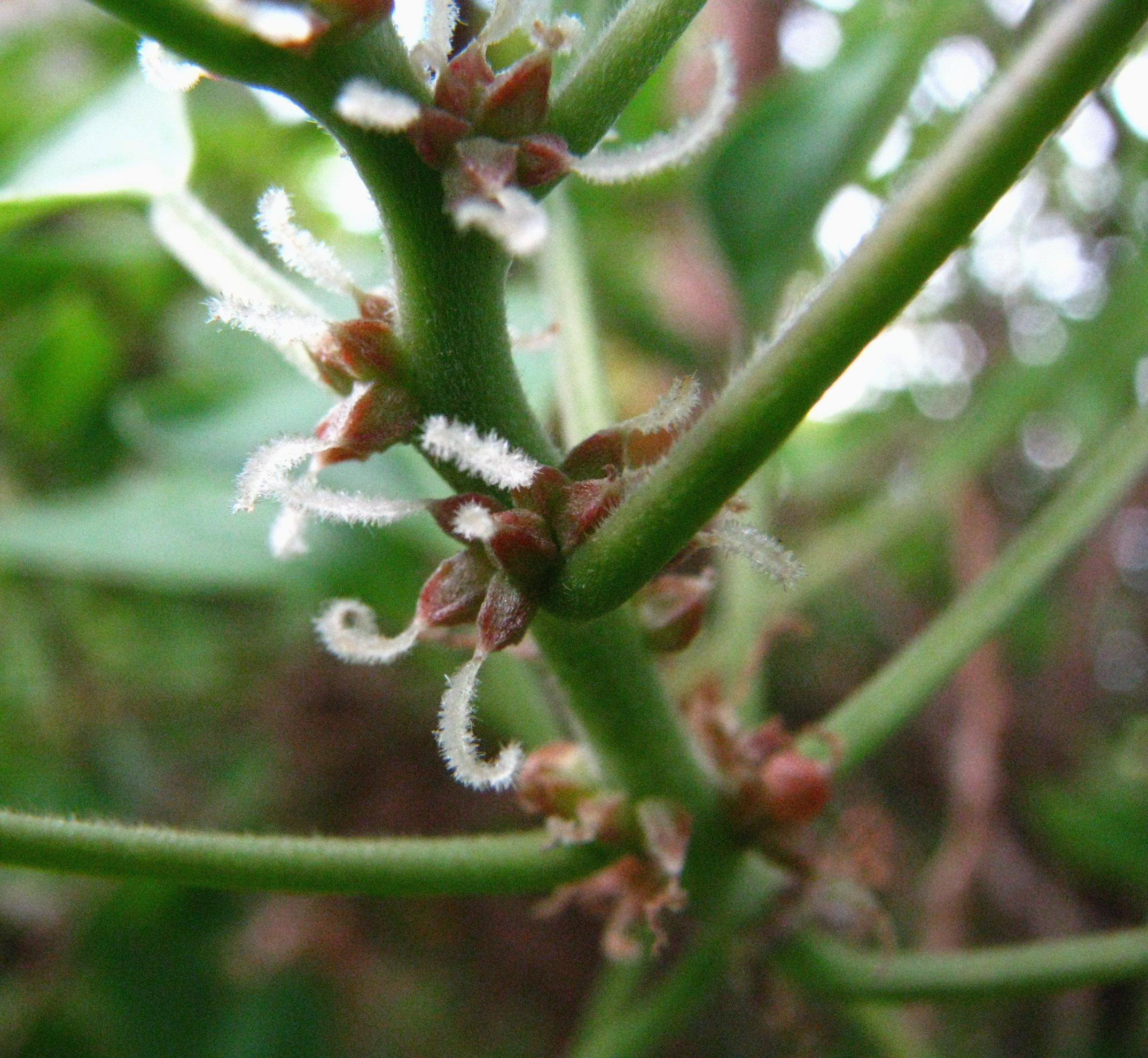

Conservation status
- Critically Imperiled (NatureServe)

Scientific classification
- Kingdom: Plantae
- Clade: Tracheophytes
- Clade: Angiosperms
- Clade: Eudicots
- Clade: Rosids
- Order: Rosales
- Family: Urticaceae
- Genus: Neraudia
- Species: N. angulata

Binomial name
- Neraudia angulata R.S.Cowan

= Neraudia angulata =

Species of flowering plant

Neraudia angulata is a rare species of flowering plant in the nettle family known by the common name angularfruit ma'oloa. It is endemic to Hawaii, where it is known only from the Waianae Range on the island of Oahu. There are nine remaining populations with a varying number of individuals; in 2006 there were 227 mature individuals counted. This is a federally listed endangered species of the United States.

This shrub grows up to 3 meters tall. The alternately arranged leaves are up to 15 centimeters long and have hairy undersides. They may have variably toothed or ragged edges.

The major threat to the species is fire. Other threats include feral pigs, feral goats, and introduced species of plants. Cattle, slugs, and rats may also be threats.
