= Neraudia sericea =

Conservation status
- Critically Imperiled (NatureServe)

Scientific classification
- Kingdom: Plantae
- Clade: Tracheophytes
- Clade: Angiosperms
- Clade: Eudicots
- Clade: Rosids
- Order: Rosales
- Family: Urticaceae
- Genus: Neraudia
- Species: N. sericea

Binomial name
- Neraudia sericea Gaudich.

Species of plant

Neraudia sericea is a rare species of flowering plant in the nettle family known by the common name woodland ma'oloa. It is endemic to Hawaii. It has been found on the islands of Molokai, Maui, Lanai, and Kahoolawe, but it has only been seen recently on Molokai and Maui. There are fewer than 200 individuals remaining. This is a federally listed endangered species of the United States.

It is a 3 to 5 m (10 to 16 ft) tall shrub with densely hairy branches. The elliptic or oval leaves are between 4.5 and 13 cm (1.7 and 5.1 in) long and have smooth margins or slightly toothed margins on young leaves. The upper leaf surface is moderately hairy, and the lower leaf surface is densely covered with irregularly curved, silky gray to white hairs up to 1 mm (0.04 in) long along the veins. The male flowers may be stalkless or have short stalks. The female flowers are stalkless and have a densely hairy calyx that is either toothed, collar-like, or divided into narrow unequal segments. The fruits are 1 mm (0.04 in) long achenes with the apical section separated from the basal portion by a deep constriction. Seeds are oval with a constriction across the upper half.
