= ʻAkahi =

High chiefess of Hawaii (died 1877)

- Died: October 8, 1877; Honolulu, Oahu
- Spouse: Kahekili Keʻeaumoku II; Kalanimoku; J. W. Kapaa
- Father: Pauwelua
- Mother: Kaluai

ʻAkahi (died October 8, 1877) was a high chiefess and female landholder of the Kingdom of Hawaii. Also known as "Akahi-a-Kaleiwohi", she was named after her great-grandmother Akahi-a-Kuleana. ʻAkahi was also the name of Akahi-a-Kuleana, the mother of 15th-century Hawaiian king ʻUmi-a-Līloa. A relation of the ruling House of Kamehameha, ʻAkahi was married to Kahekili Keʻeaumoku II and Kalanimoku, two prominent Hawaiian high chiefs and politicians during the early 19th century. She lived most of her life on the island of Hawaii where she was allocated vast landholdings after the Great Mahele of 1848. After her death in 1877, these lands were inherited by her relative Bernice Pauahi Bishop and upon the latter's death became part of the Bernice Pauahi Bishop Estate, which now funds the Kamehameha Schools.

== Life and family ==
Born in the early 19th-century, her parents were Pauwelua and Kaluai. Both parents were from aliʻi (noble) lines of descent. Her mother Kaluai was descended from the high chiefs of Waimea, Hawaii. From her father's family descent, she was a great-granddaughter of Keōua Kalanikupuapaʻīkalaninui Ahilapalapa, the father of King Kamehameha I who was the progenitor the House of Kamehameha and the unifier of the Hawaiian Islands. Her father Pauwelua descended from Keōua's last wife Akahi-a-Kawalu (her great-grandmother and namesake), who became the mother of Kaleiwohi who married Kailipakalua and had Pauwelua. Through the Keōua line, according to Elizabeth Kekaʻaniau, "Akahi was the third cousin of Bernice Pauahi Bishop and the second cousin of Kekaʻaniau herself." Akahi was also the cousin of Pauahi's mother Kōnia through their common grandmother Kailipakalua. In her final will, Pauahi called Akahi her aunt and historian George Kanahele also called her Pauahi's aunt.

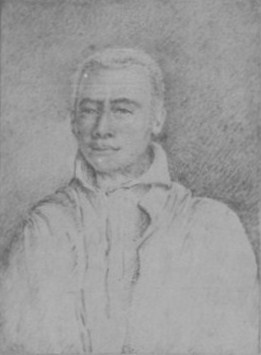
Kalanimoku, drawing by Robert Dampier, c. 1825

ʻAkahi's first known marriage was to High Chief Kahekili Keʻeaumoku II, a brother of the Kuhina Nui, Queen Kaʻahumanu. He was also the Governor of Maui and commonly known by foreigners as "Governor Cox". After Keʻeaumoku's death in 1824, ʻAkahi married Prime Minister William Pit Kalanimoku, on June 28, 1825. This date was recorded in the journal of Spanish settler Don Francisco de Paula Marín while American missionary Reverend Samuel Ruggle claimed the marriage took place the year before. The marriage ceremony was held at the Kawaiahaʻo Church and attended by the a number of chiefs and foreign residents. Kalanimoku, who chose his Western name in honor of his English contemporary William Pitt the Younger, was known for his political savvy and military prowess and had served as Prime Minister under the reigns of three Hawaiian kings and the regency of Kaʻahumanu. ʻAkahi became a widow for the second time when he died February 7, 1827. Her final husband was J. W. Kapaa, who outlived her and died in Honolulu on March 3, 1890.

Very few details survived about ʻAkahi's life. On September 28, 1840, American Protestant missionary Reverend Cochran Forbes complained about her adherence to the Roman Catholic faith. Forbes wrote in his journal, "Akahi the head woman of Kealia with her husband is pleased with popery, because they do not require holiness of life as a test of communion. She will probably become a papist as she is unwilling to abandon her lusts." Her former husband Kalanimoku had also been baptized a Roman Catholic but later joined the Protestant church. In 1841, she was noted as the "chief woman" in Kealakekua, Hawaii and in 1845, she made a deposition in the case of Richard Charlton. She seemed to have resided exclusively on the island of Hawaii with occasional trips to Honolulu.

== Landholdings ==
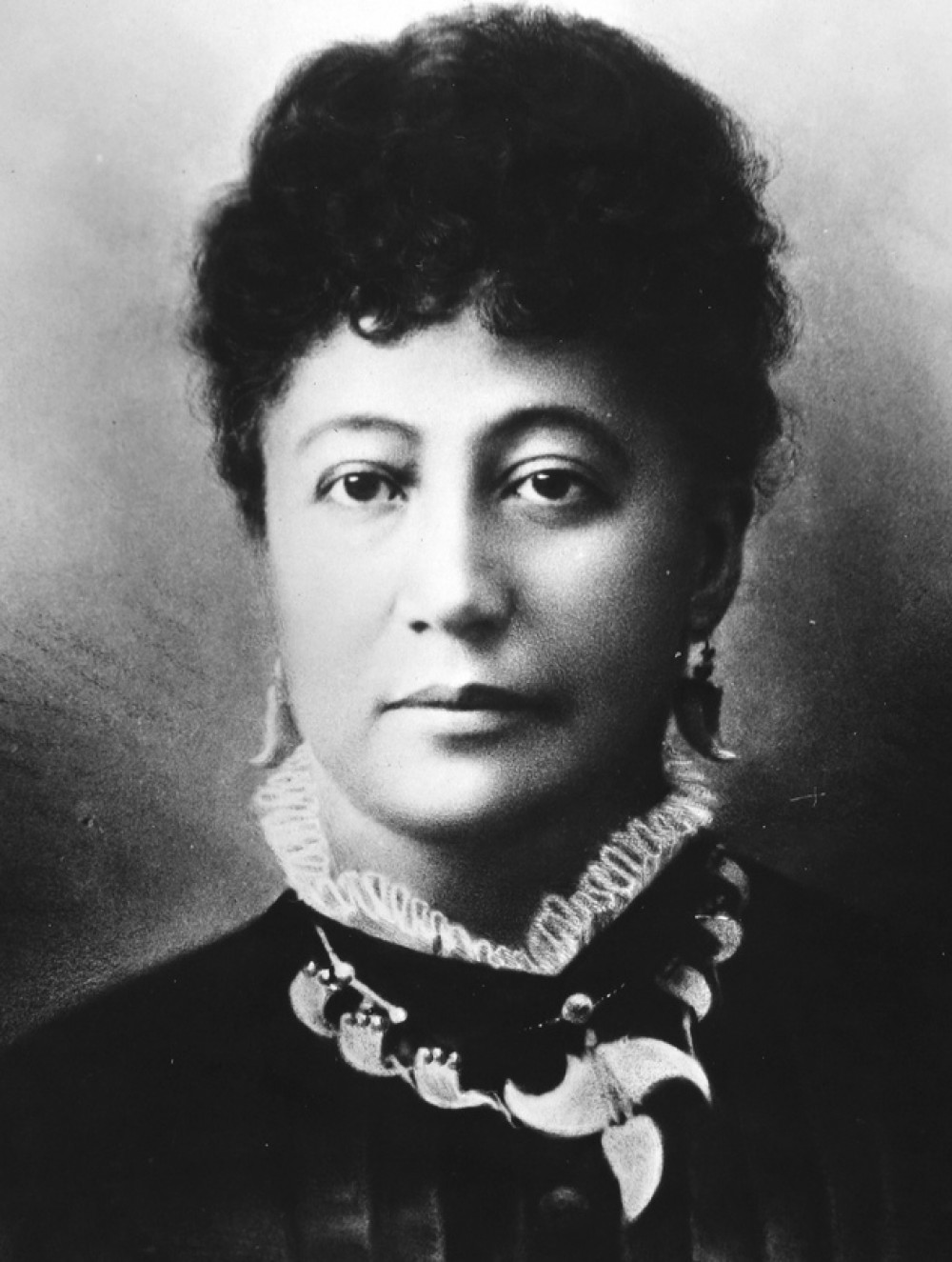
Bernice Pauahi Bishop

Reflective of her status as an aliʻi and her origin and upbringing in the districts of Kona and Kohala, she inherited and held vast landholdings principally on the islands of Hawaii and Oahu. Prior the Great Māhele, the great Hawaiian land redistribution enacted by King Kamehameha III in 1848, ʻAkahi held ten 'āina (land divisions) on both islands. After the land reform, she had to relinquish 46 percent of her former properties including Kahei, Kohala; Kaha, Niulii, Kohala; Haukoi, Hamakua; Kawainui, Hilo; Manana-uka Nui., Ewa; and Weloka, Manana, Ewa. Her remaining landholdings totaled at 9,557 acres at the time of her death and included 7,300 acres in Kealia, South Kona; 656 acres in Makalawena, North Kona; 1,106 acres in Keʻeiiki, North Kona; 466 acres in Puʻuwepa, Kohala; 19.49 acres in Ulupaʻalua, Kohala and 10.25 acres in Kaʻaipu, Mānoa, on Oahu.

ʻAkahi became ill in 1875 and died two years later on October 8, 1877, at Haleʻākala, the home of Bernice Pauahi Bishop and her husband Charles Reed Bishop, in Honolulu. In her will created during her final illness in May 1875, she gave her lands to her surviving husband Kapaa and to Pauahi. The Bishops were named as the executors of her will. Another cousin Keawehaku claimed that the will was forged and she had died intestate, but his case was dismissed by Judge William Austin Whiting of the first circuit court of Honolulu in 1894.

By the time of Bernice Pauahi Bishop's death in 1884, her estate consisted of 485,563 acres of land across the Hawaiian Islands which she had either purchased or inherited from her parents Pākī and Kōnia, from ʻAkahi, from her cousin Keʻelikōlani and other relatives. These lands were incorporated after Pauahi's death into the Bernice Pauahi Bishop Estates, a trust which funds the Kamehameha Schools to the present day. In her will, Pauahi also temporarily gave the ahupuaʻa of Kealia, on the island of Hawaii, formerly belonging to Akahi, and Lumahai, on the island of Kauai, to Queen Liliuokalani "to have and to hold for and during the term of her natural life". Liliuokalani died in 1917 and these lands reverted to the Trustees of the Bishop Estate.

== Bibliography ==
- Del Piano, Barbara (2009). "Kalanimoku: Iron Cable of the Hawaiian Kingdom, 1769–1827". Hawaiian Journal of History. 43. Honolulu: Hawaiian Historical Society: 1–28. hdl:10524/12237.
- Kamakau, Samuel (1992) [1961]. Ruling Chiefs of Hawaii (Revised ed.). Honolulu: Kamehameha Schools Press. ISBN 0-87336-014-1. OCLC 25008795.
- Kameʻeleihiwa, Lilikalā (1992). Native Land and Foreign Desires. Honolulu: Bishop Museum Press. ISBN 0-930897-59-5. OCLC 154146650.
- Kanahele, George S. (2002) [1986]. Pauahi: The Kamehameha Legacy. Honolulu: Kamehameha Schools Press. ISBN 978-0-87336-005-0. OCLC 173653971.
- McKinzie, Edith Kawelohea (1983). Stagner, Ishmael W. (ed.). Hawaiian Genealogies: Extracted from Hawaiian Language Newspapers. Vol. 1. Honolulu: University of Hawaii Press. ISBN 0-939154-28-5. OCLC 12555087.
- Pratt, Elizabeth Kekaaniauokalani Kalaninuiohilaukapu (1920). History of Keoua Kalanikupuapa-i-nui: Father of Hawaii Kings, and His Descendants, with Notes on Kamehameha I, First King of All Hawaii. Honolulu: Honolulu Star-Bulletin. OCLC 154181545.
- Van Dyke, Jon M. (2008). Who Owns the Crown Lands of Hawaiʻi?. Honolulu: University of Hawaii Press. ISBN 978-0-8248-6560-3. OCLC 257449971 – via Project MUSE.
