= Neraudia ovata =

Big Island maʻoloa

Conservation status
- Critically Endangered (IUCN 2.3)

Scientific classification
- Kingdom: Plantae
- Clade: Tracheophytes
- Clade: Angiosperms
- Clade: Eudicots
- Clade: Rosids
- Order: Rosales
- Family: Urticaceae
- Genus: Neraudia
- Species: N. ovata

Binomial name
- Neraudia ovata Gaudich.

Species of flowering plant

Neraudia ovata, commonly known as Big Island maʻoloa, is a species of flowering plant in the nettle family, Urticaceae, that is endemic to the Big Island of Hawaii. It inhabits dry forests growing on lava flows in the island's Kona District. Big Island maʻoloa is a sprawling shrub with stems 1–3 m (3.3–9.8 ft) long. It is threatened by habitat loss. It is a federally listed endangered species of the United States. There are no more than 18 mature individuals persisting in natural populations, and some individuals which have been planted in appropriate habitat.
