= Antonio Mongitore =

Sicilian presbyter, historian and writer (1663–1743)

Reverend Antonio Mongitore
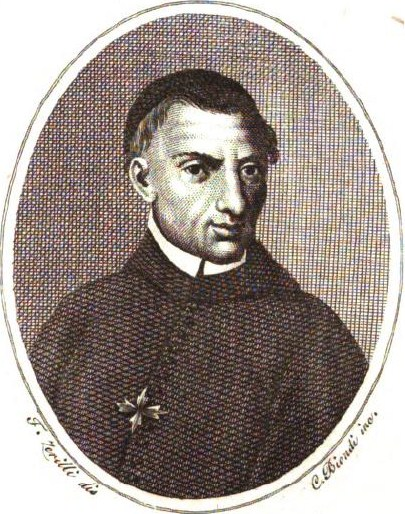
- Born: May 4, 1663; Palermo, Kingdom of Sicily
- Died: 6 June 1743 (aged 80); Palermo, Kingdom of Sicily
- Occupations: Catholic priest, historian, writer
- Known for: Bibliotheca Sicula sive de scriptoribus Siculis
- Parent(s): Giuseppe Mongitore and Anna Mongitore (née Abbate)

Academic background
- Influences: Ippolito Marracci; Vincenzo Auria; Ludovico Antonio Muratori

Academic work
- Discipline: Medieval studies
- Sub-discipline: History of Sicily
- Influenced: Gioacchino di Marzo

Antonio Mongitore (4 May 1663 – 6 June 1743) was a Sicilian presbyter, historian and writer, known for his works about the history of Sicily. He was also canon of the cathedral chapter of Palermo.

== Biography ==
Mongitore was born in Palermo on 4 May 1663 in a family of modest means. After having received his early education in the private religious schools, he entered the Jesuit College where he soon made an impression for his intelligence, religious sentiment, and sober habits. His education was, however, interrupted by the necessities of his family, and his aspirations to the priesthood frustrated by a regulation of the then Archbishop Jaime de Palafox y Cardona, who in an attempt to reduce the number of indigent priests, made a benefice a condition for ordination. Finding the priesthood for the moment beyond his reach, Mongitore, on his father's advice, studied law. During this period of his life which corresponded to the Messina revolt and the attempt by Louis XIV to use this occasion to weaken an already tottering Spanish Empire, Mongitore began his life-long study of the history and privileges of the ancient Kingdom of Sicily. It was also during this time that he made the friendship of the illustrious historian, Vincenzo Auria. Owing to the relaxing of the rule on benefices which followed Palafox's transference to Seville, Mongitore was ordained a priest on 20 May 1687. Within the church he rose to high honours, becoming a canon of the Cathedral (1721) and consultore of the Holy Office.

== Works ==
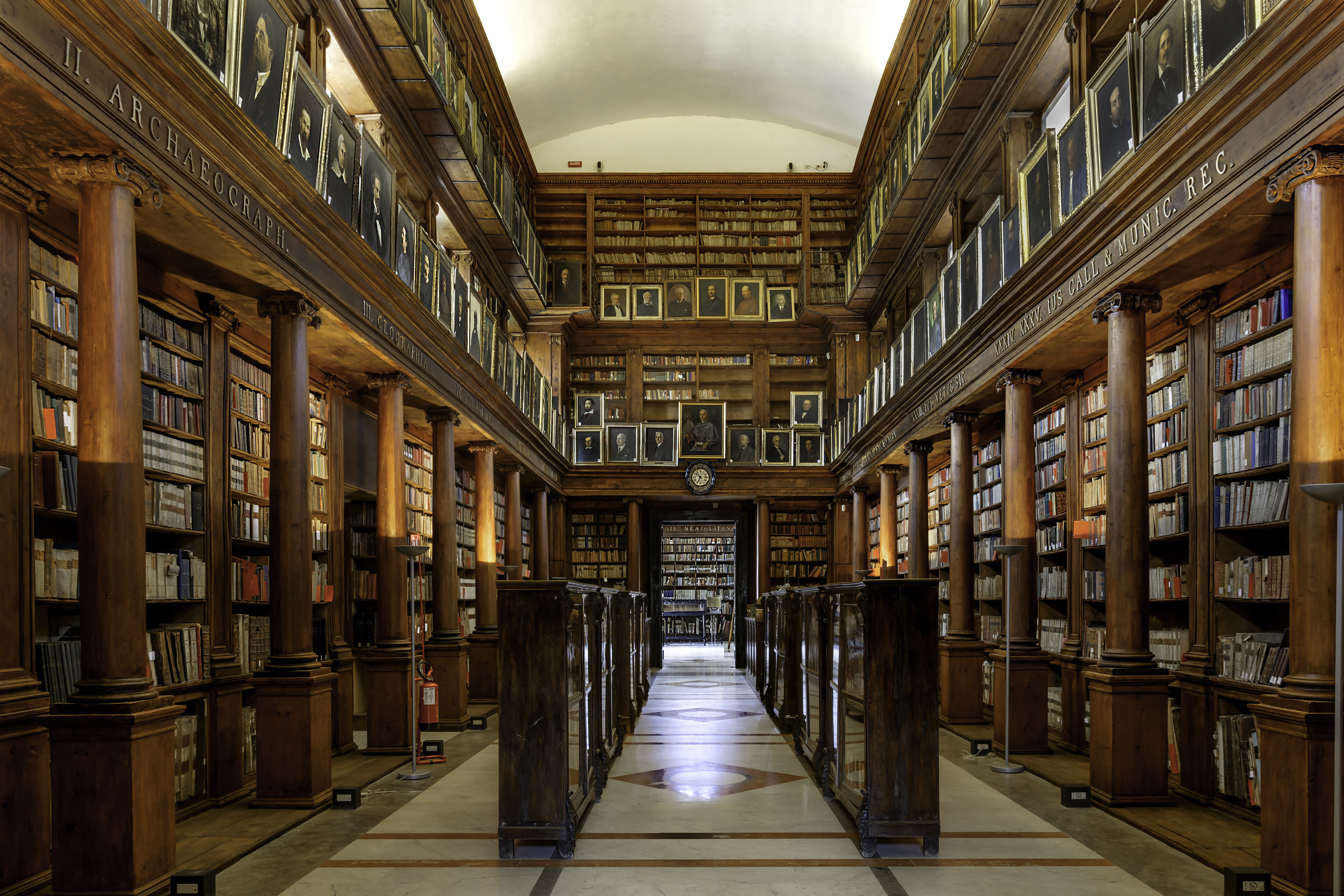
The Biblioteca comunale di Casa Professa of Palermo, where the ensemble of Mongitore's manuscripts is conserved.

His first book (1695) is a life of St. Francis de Sales and his last (1742) an account of the religious fervours of Palermo and Sicily in honour of the Immaculate Conception. His most important work is the Bibliotheca sicula (1708), still consulted with respect by those who study the history (particularly the literary history) of Sicily. Of equal importance to the Bibliotheca Sicula is his Istoria sacra di tutte le chiese, conventi, monasteri, ospedali, ed altri luoghi pii della città di Palermo in nine manuscript volumes. These, along with his Palermitan diary, form the bulk of his manuscripts in the Biblioteca Comunale. In this pages Mongitore collected all that had been written by his predecessors, about the Palermitan churches and monastic foundations and added his own comments based on his immense erudition and formidable powers of observation.

== List of works ==
- Il trionfo palermitano nella solenne acclamazione del catolico re delle Spagne, e di Sicilia. Filippo V. festeggiata in Palermo a 30 di Gennaro 1701, Palermo 1701.
- De' due santi Mamiliani arciuescovi, e cittadini di Palermo ..., tomo secondo, 1701.
- Vita di san Filareto confessore palermitano dell'ordine di S. Basilio col ragguaglio dell'invenzione del suo corpo in Calabria, Palermo 1703.
- La Sicilia inventrice o vero Le invenzioni lodevoli nate in Sicilia, opera del dottor D. Vincenzo Auria palermitano, con li divertimenti geniali, osservazioni e giunte all'istessa di D. Antonino Mongitore, 1704.
- Bibliotheca sicula, sive De scriptoribus siculis, Palermo 1707–1714 (2 Vol.): tomo primo on-line; tomo secondo on-line
- Memorie istoriche della fondazione del venerabil monastero di S. Maria di tutte le grazie nella città di Palermo, detto S. Vito, del Terz'Ordine di S. Francesco. Con le vite de' suoi fondatori, e d'alcune religiose morte in esso con fame di santita, Palermo 1710.
- Apologetica epistola Philalethi Orethei de patria s. Silviae Panormitanae s. Gregorii Magni matris, Palermo 1715.
- Notitia regiae, et imperialis capellae Collegiatae Sancti Petri sacri, et regi i palatii Panormitani, Palermo 1716
- Parlamenti generali ordinarij et straordinarj celebrati nel Regno di Sicilia dal 1494 fino al 1658, Palermo 1717.
- Il parlamento di Sicilia. Memorie istoriche, 1718.
- Palermo divoto di Maria Vergine, e Maria Vergine protettrice di Palermo, Palermo 1719–1720(2 Vol.).
- Monumenta historica sacrae domus mansionis SS. Trinitatis Militaris Ordinis Theutonicorum urbis Panormi, Palermo 1721.
- Rocchi Pirri, Regiae, et Imperialis Capellae Collegiatae Sancti Petri sacri et regii palatii Panormitani Notitia opus posthumum cum supplemento et additionibus D. Antonini Mongitore, Lugduni Batavorum, sumptibus Petri Vander, Bibliopolae & Typographi Academie atque Civitatis, 1723.
- L'atto pubblico di fede solennemente celebrato nella città di Palermo a 6 aprile 1724 dal Tribunale del S. Uffizio di Sicilia, Palermo 1724.
- Istoria del ven. monastero de' sette angioli nella città di Palermo, dell'ordine delle Minime di S. Francesco di Paola : colle memorie delle religiose illustri in santità che in esso fiorirono, Palermo 1726.
- Il mostro di Palermo : proposto da monsignor Antonio di Guevara, convinto favoloso dalla ragione e da'scrittori, Palermo 1727.
- Palermo ammonito, penitente, e grato, nel formidabil terremoto del primo settembre 1726, Palermo 1727.
- Vita del gran servo di Dio D. Paolo Riggio e Saladino palermitano, de principi di Campofiorito, Palermo 1728.
- (in Italian) Vita di monsignor F. D. Giuseppe Gasch dell'ordine dei minimi da s. Francesco di Paola, Palermo 1729.
- Le antiche porte della città di Palermo non più esistenti, Palermo 1732.
- Discorso apologetico di Filalete Oreteo intorno all'origine, e fondazione della chiesa palermitana dal principe degli appostoli S. Pietro, Palermo 1733.
- Roccho Pirri, Sicilia sacra disquisitionibus, et notitiis illustrata ... editio tertia emendata & continuatione ... cura & studio S.T.D.D. Antonini Mongitore, Palermo 1733 (2. Vol.)
- Bullae, privilegia, et instrumenta Panormitanae metropolitanae ecclesiae, regni Siciliae primariae, Palermo 1734.
- Rime degli Ereini di Palermo, Roma 1734.
- Discorso istorico su l'antico titolo di Regno concesso all'isola di Sicilia, Palermo 1735.
- Siciliæ sacræ celeberrimi abbatis Netini d. Rocchi Pirri additiones, et correctiones, Palermo 1735.
- Lettera responsiva del sig. N.N. siciliano all'illustre signor marchese N.N. napolitano, Palermo 1736.
- Della Sicilia ricercata nelle cose più memorabili, Palermo 1742–1743 (2 Vol.). tomo secondo on-line
- Parlamenti generali del Regno di Sicilia dall'anno 1446 fino al 1748. Con le memorie istoriche dell'antico, e moderno uso del Parlamento appresso varie nazioni, ed in particolare della sua origine in Sicilia, e del modo di celebrarsi, Palermo 1749 (2 vol.): tomo secondo (on-line)
- Palermo santificato dalla vita de' suoi cittadini : vite de' santi e beati palermitani, Palermo 1757.
- Discorso storico della Cattolica Religione nel Regno di Sicilia in tempo del dominio de' Saraceni di Antonino Mongitore, canonico della Santa Metropolitana Chiesa di Palermo , da pagina 117, in "Opuscoli di Autori Siciliani alla grandezza di monsignor D. Francesco Testa...", Palermo, 1762.
- (in Spanish) Vita di monsignor F. D. Giuseppe Gasch dell'ordine dei minimi da s. Francesco di Paola, Palermo 1765.
- Discorso istorico su l'antico titolo di Regno concesso all'isola di Sicilia e suoi dritti alla indipendenza dal Regno di Napoli, Palermo 1821.
- L'atto pubblico di fede solennemente celebrato nella città di Palermo à 6 aprile 1724 dal Tribunale del S. Uffizio di Sicilia, dedicato alla maestà C. C. di Carlo 6. imperadore e 3. re di Sicilia, Bologna 1868.
- Il Monastero e la Chiesa di S. Spirito o dei Vespri in Palermo, Palermo 1882.
- Palermo santificato dalla vita dei suoi cittadini, ossia Vite dei santi e beati palermitani, Palermo 1888 (voll. 2).
- Bibliotheca sicula, sive de scriptoribus siculis qui tum vetera, tum recentiora saecula illustrarunt, notitiae locupletissimae, Bologna 1971(voll. 2).
- Della Sicilia ricercata, Sala Bolognese 1977 (voll. 2).
- Memorie dei pittori, scultori, architetti, artefici in cera siciliani, a cura di Elvira Natoli, Palermo, 1977.
- Le porte della città di Palermo al presente esistenti, descritte da Lipario Triziano palermitano, Palermo 1980.
- La Sicilia ricercata nelle cose più memorabili, Palermo 1981.
- Il Monastero e la Chiesa di S. Spirito e dei Vespri in Palermo, Palermo 1982.
- Le porte della città di Palermo al presente esistenti, descritte da Lipario Triziano palermitano, Palermo 1988.
- Le chiese fuori la città nella campagna", Palermo 1995 (trascrizione integrale dell'opera manoscritta in F. Lo Piccolo, In rure sacra").
- La Sicilia ricercata nelle cose più memorabili, Catania 2000.
- Storia delle chiese di Palermo : i conventi, Palermo 2009 (voll. 2) (trascrizione integrale dell'opera manoscritta curata da F. Lo Piccolo).

== Bibliography ==
- Bazzano, Nicoletta (2011). "MONGITORE, Antonino". Dizionario Biografico degli Italiani (in Italian). Vol. 75: Miranda–Montano. Rome: Istituto dell'Enciclopedia Italiana. ISBN 978-88-12-00032-6.
- Francesco Testa, Ne’ funerali di Antonio Mongitore canonico della Metropolitana Chiesa di Palermo, Palermo 1743;
- M. Gancia, Antonio Mongitore e il suo tempo, in A. Mongitore, La Sicilia ricercata nelle cose più memorabili, Palermo 1981, pp. V-XVI;
- M.E. Alaimo, Antonio Mongitore: chi era e com’era, ibid., pp. XVIII-XXXVII.
