= Kaikioʻewa =

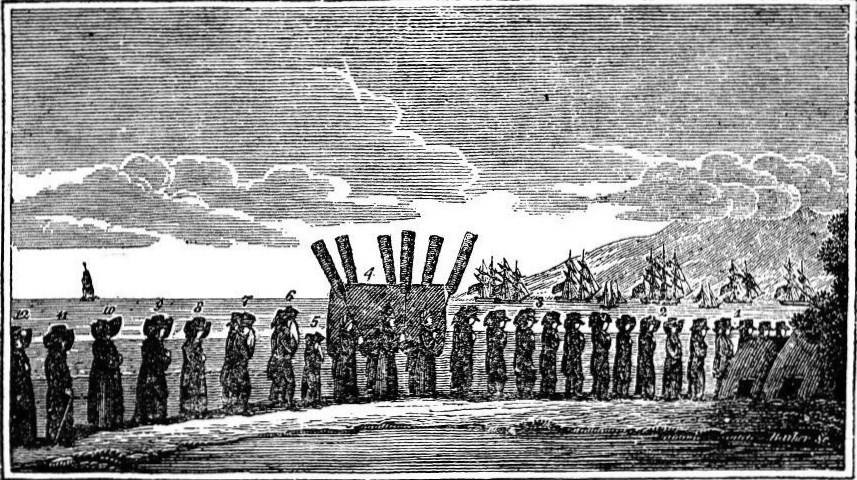
- Kaikioʻewa and his wife Keaweamahi, number 11, at the rear of the funeral procession of Queen Keōpūolani, 1823.

Governor of Kauaʻi
- Tenure: 1825–1839
- Predecessor: Kahalaiʻa Luanuʻu
- Successor: Keaweamahi
- Born: c. 1765; Waimea, Kauai
- Died: April 10, 1839; Honolulu, Oahu
- Spouse: Piʻipiʻi Kalanikaulihiwakama; Wauhaukapu; Keaweamahi
- Issue: Kuwahine; Likelike; Kamehameha III (hānai); Moses Kekūāiwa (hānai); Harriet Kapu Kawaha'ea
- Father: Kaʻianaukupe Kaolohaka-a-keawe
- Mother: Kekikipaʻa Kalanikauleleiaiwi

Kaikioʻewa (c. 1765 - April 10, 1839) was a cousin of Kamehameha I and the first governor of Kauai. He was born in Waimea in 1765. He moved to Hilo as a young man where he initially opposed his cousin until after the Battle of Hilo when he and other aliʻi joined Kamehameha. Kamehameha I saved Kaikioʻewa's life when he was about to be killed by another chief for stealing his wife. As Governor he was known as an easy target for merchants as he was known for spending a great deal on merchandise. He was married to Keaweamahi (w). Kaikioʻewa served as the first governor of Kauai from 1825 until his death, when his wife Keaweamahi would serve temporarily.
