= Cryptid whale =

Cetaceans claimed to exist

Cryptid whales are cetaceans claimed to exist by cryptozoologists on the basis of informal sightings, but not accepted by taxonomists as they lack formal descriptions of type specimens. Over the past few hundred years, sailors and whalers have reported seeing whales they cannot identify. The most well-known are Giglioli's Whale, the rhinoceros dolphin, Trunko, the high-finned sperm whale, and the Alula whale.

== High-finned sperm whale ==
Highfin sperm whale

The high-finned sperm whale, or the high-finned cachalot, is an alleged variant or relative of the known sperm whale, Physeter macrocephalus, with an unusually tall dorsal fin from the North Atlantic. The physician Sir Robert Sibbald, in 1687, described an alleged stranded female individual on Orkney, saying its dorsal fins was similar to a "mizzen mast". Carl Linnaeus listed Physeter microps and Physeter tursio as High-finned sperm whales in the 10th edition of Systema Naturae in 1758. There was much confusion between the reports of sperm whales, killer whales, pilot whales and beluga whales, and Georges Cuvier sorted the confusion out and determined that there were no high-finned sperm whales and that there was only one species of sperm whale in one genus. Sibbald was at least aware of the existence of killer whales and beluga whales, and he noted that he did not directly witness the whales above so the report of the shape of their heads and some other features is unclear. Furthermore, it has also been pointed out that the high-finned Physeter species listed by Linnaeus may have been killer whales, and that his use of the scientific name Delphinus orca may have been for bottlenose dolphins. Another alleged sighting was off the Annapolis Basin, Nova Scotia, Canada on September 27, 1946, where the creature was apparently trapped for two days. Its length was estimated to be between 3 and 30 metres (10 and 100 ft).

== Alula whale ==
The Alula whale, or the Alula killer, or Orcinus mörzer-bruynsus, was discussed and illustrated for the first time, but not formally named, by W. F. J. Mörzer Bruyns in Field Guide of Whales and Dolphins, purportedly being seen by the author several times. It resembles a sepia brown killer whale with a well-rounded forehead and white, star-like scars on the body. He wrote they are present in the deep coastal waters in eastern Gulf of Aden to Socotra, and they were seen in April, May, June, and September. He estimated it to be roughly 6–7 metres (20–23 ft) long, weigh around 1.8 metric tons (2.0 short tons), and have a dorsal fin that is around 2 metres (6.6 ft) high. Bruyns reported that they maintained a cruising speed of 4 knots, and traveled in groups of 4 to 8, but usually 6.

== Unidentified beaked whales ==
The "Moore's Beach monster", an initially unidentified carcass found in 1925 on Moore's Beach on Monterey Bay was identified by the California Academy of Sciences as a Baird's beaked whale.

Other cases of purportedly unknown beaked whales include an alleged species of similar size to fully grown specimens of Berardius bairdii, which has been reported to live in the Sea of Okhotsk. These whales are claimed to have heads somewhat resembling Longman's beaked whales, and there have been reports of beachings occurring along areas within and adjacent to the Tatar Strait in the 2010s. In addition, possible new species of beaked whales have been described as being present in the coastal and pelagic waters of Abashiri and the Shiretoko Peninsula in northeastern Hokkaido.

== See also ==
- List of cryptids
