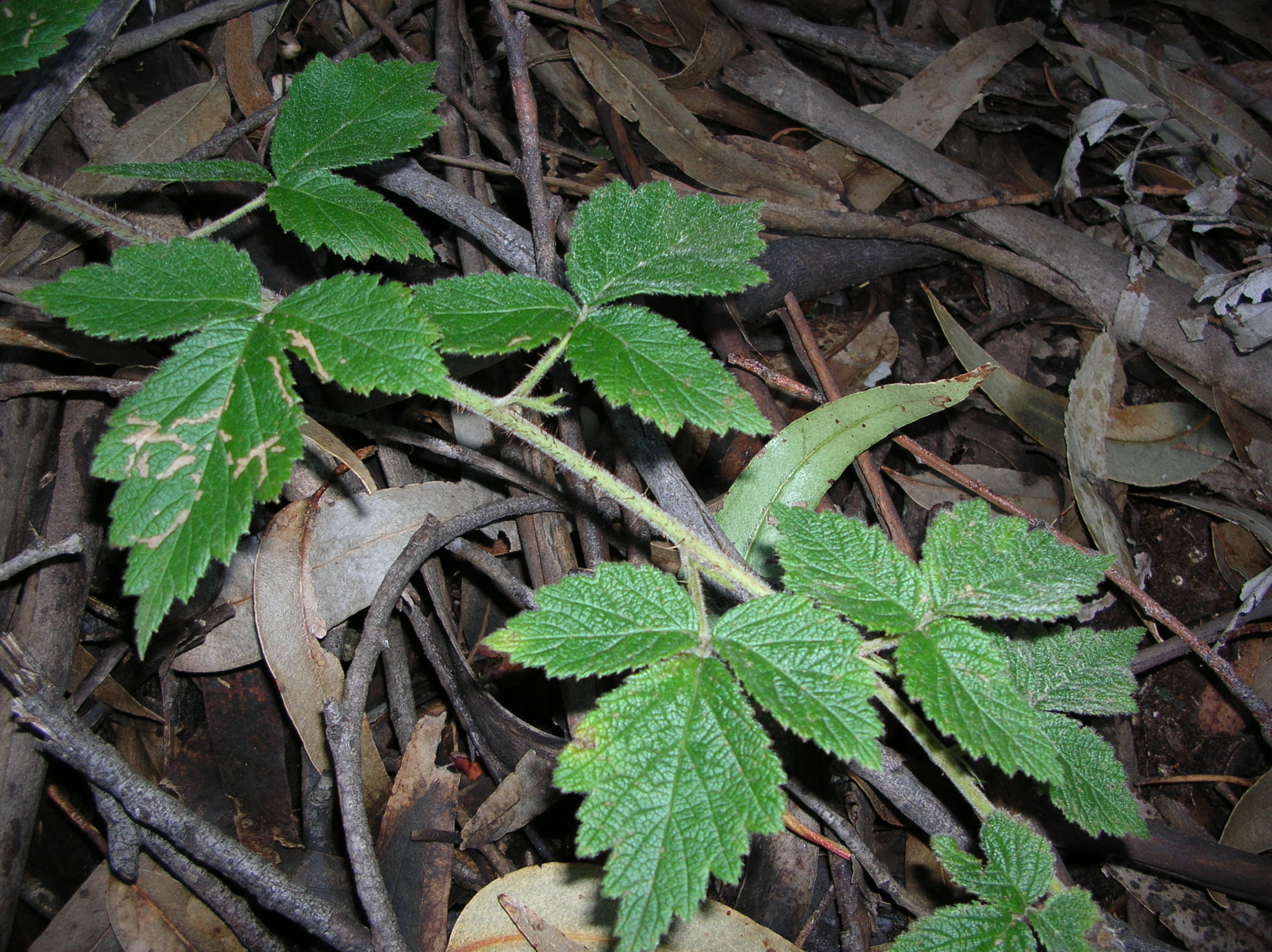

Conservation status
- Imperiled (NatureServe)

Scientific classification
- Kingdom: Plantae
- Clade: Embryophytes
- Clade: Tracheophytes
- Clade: Spermatophytes
- Clade: Angiosperms
- Clade: Eudicots
- Clade: Rosids
- Order: Rosales
- Family: Rosaceae
- Genus: Rubus
- Subgenus: Rubus subg. Idaeobatus
- Species: R. macraei

Binomial name
- Rubus macraei A.Gray

= Rubus macraei =

Species of plant

Rubus macraei, commonly known as ʻĀkalakala, is a species of Rubus that is endemic to Hawaii.

== Taxonomy ==
Although superficially similar to the other Hawaiian species, R. hawaiensis, sequence differences of the chloroplast gene ndhF indicate that they are derived from separate colonization events of Hawaii. These data indicate that R. macraei is more distantly related to both Asian and North American species of subgenus Idaeobatus than R. hawaiensis. R. macraei usually has a creeping rather than erect or sprawling habit.

== Distribution and habitat ==
It inhabits wet forests, bogs, and subalpine shrublands at elevations of 1,610–2,080 metres (5,280–6,820 feet) on the Big Island and East Maui.
