= Neraudia melastomifolia =

Maʻaloa

Conservation status
- Vulnerable (IUCN 2.3)

Scientific classification
- Kingdom: Plantae
- Clade: Tracheophytes
- Clade: Angiosperms
- Clade: Eudicots
- Clade: Rosids
- Order: Rosales
- Family: Urticaceae
- Genus: Neraudia
- Species: N. melastomifolia

Binomial name
- Neraudia melastomifolia Gaudich.

Species of flowering plant

Neraudia melastomifolia, known as maʻaloa in Hawaiian, is a species of flowering plant in the nettle family, Urticaceae, that is endemic to Hawaii. It is a shrub or small tree, reaching a height of up to 5 m (16 ft). N. melastomifolia inhabits coastal mesic, mixed mesic, and wet forests at elevations of 270–1,160 m (890–3,810 ft) on Kauaʻi Oʻahu, Molokaʻi, and Maui. It is threatened by habitat loss.
