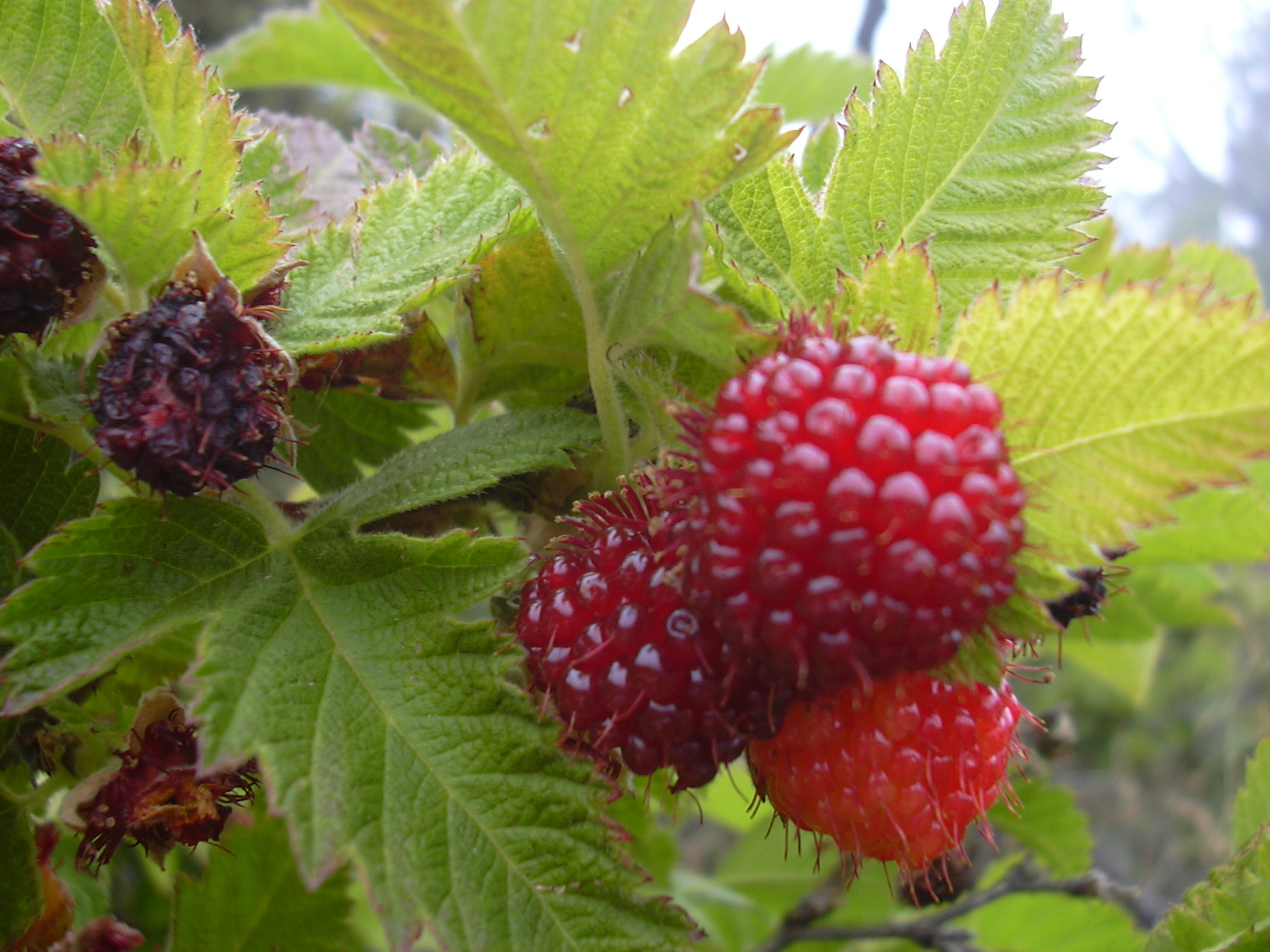

Conservation status
- Imperiled (NatureServe)

Scientific classification
- Kingdom: Plantae
- Clade: Tracheophytes
- Clade: Angiosperms
- Clade: Eudicots
- Clade: Rosids
- Order: Rosales
- Family: Rosaceae
- Genus: Rubus
- Subgenus: Rubus subg. Idaeobatus
- Species: R. hawaiensis

Binomial name
- Rubus hawaiensis A. Gray

Synonyms
- Rubus hawaiiensis A. Gray

= Rubus hawaiensis =

Species of plant

Rubus hawaiensis, also called the ʻĀkala, is one of two species (with R. macraei) commonly known as Hawaiian raspberry, endemic to Hawaii.

== Description ==
Rubus hawaiensis is a deciduous shrub, typically growing as a clump of erect or (when longer) arching canes, 1.5–3 metres (5–10 feet) long. The leaves are compound, with three leaflets. The fruit is red, up to 4 cm (1 1/2 in) long and 2.5 cm (1 in) wide.

Although frequently described as prickle-free ("thornless"), and often used as an example of loss of defenses in island plants, most plants do have thin prickles at least when small. As the cane grows the outer layer of bark usually sheds, taking the prickles with it.

== Distribution and habitat ==
Endemic to Hawaii, the plant is found on the islands of Kauaʻi, Molokaʻi, Maui, O'ahu, and Hawaiʻi in mesic to wet forest at elevations of 600–3,070 m (1,970–10,070 ft). In most areas it is not common, but in some places (such as the upper Koʻolau Gap in Haleakalā and Laupāhoehoe Natural Area Reserve) it can be a dominant member of the understory vegetation.

Although similar to the other Hawaiian species, R. macraei, the two are believed to be derived from separate dispersals to Hawaii.

== Impact ==
The presence of invasive alien Rubus species along with two native species has led to a debate on biological control. Specifically, whether an agent that might be able to control the alien species should be released even if it may have serious impacts on the native species.

Interest in breeding "thornless" varieties of edible raspberries (possibly even with distantly related species since most Rubus readily hybridize) has led to the introduction of several species of continental Rubus species which have since escaped cultivation and become pests. These include R. ellipticus (yellow Himalayan raspberry) and R. argutus (Florida prickly blackberry).

== Uses ==
The fruit is edible but not often eaten, as it is sour and somewhat bitter.

== In culture ==
This berry is believed to be the land counterpart to the limu kala, both appearing in the first period of creation (wā) in the Kumulipo.
