= Boki (Hawaiian chief) =

Hawaiian high chief and merchant (c. 1785–c. 1829)

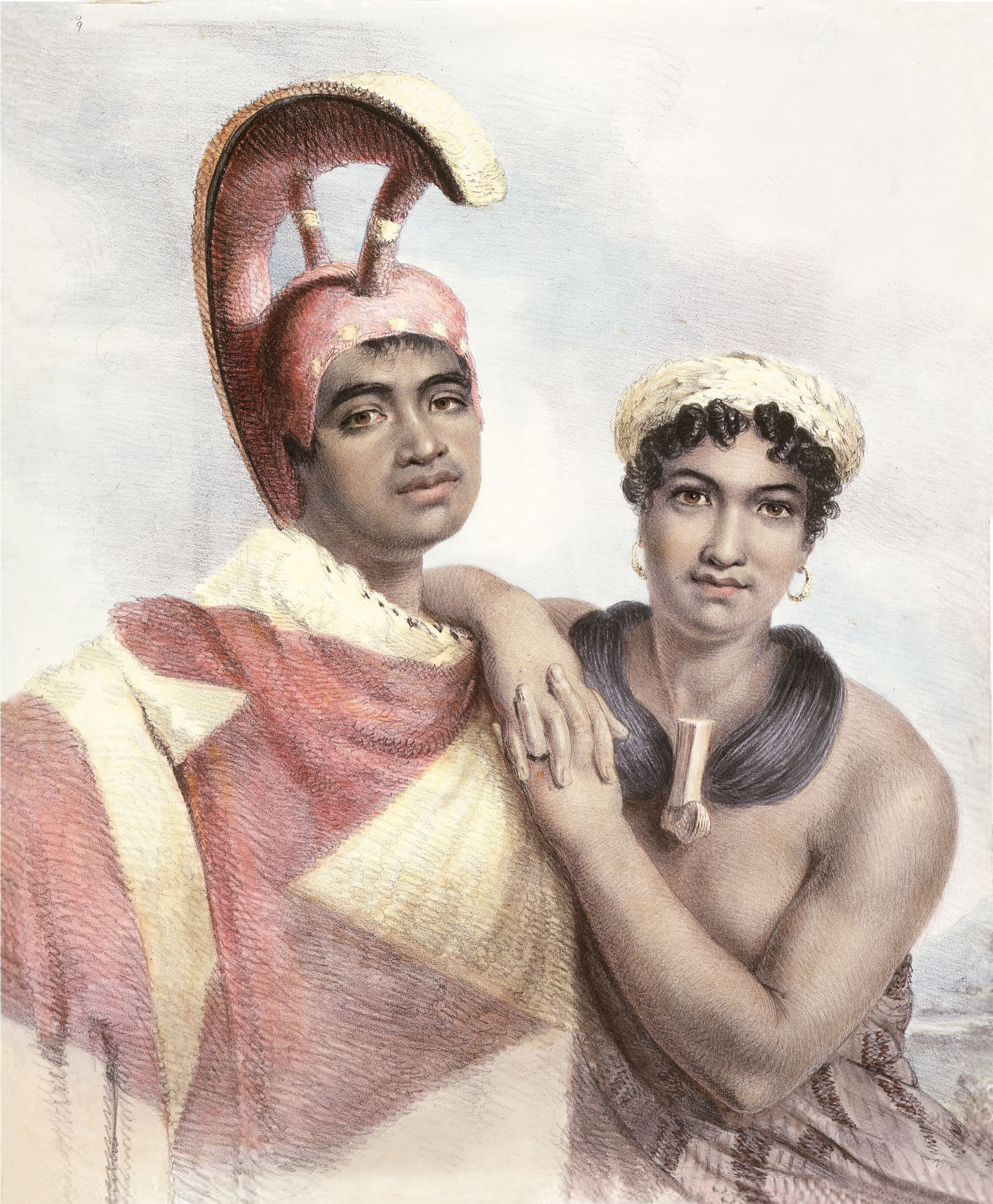
- Boki (left) in a painting by John Hayter

Governor of Oahu
- In office 1825–1829
- Preceded by: Lydia Nāmāhāna Piʻia
- Succeeded by: Kuini Liliha

Personal details
- Born: Hawaii
- Died: after December, 1829 Samoa?
- Spouse(s): Kalilikauoha; Likelike; Kuini Liliha
- Parent(s): Kekuamanoha and Kamakahukilani

Boki (sometimes Poki, born Kamāʻuleʻule) (before 1785–after December 1829) was a High Chief in the ancient Hawaiian tradition and served the Kingdom of Hawaii as royal governor of the island of Oahu. Boki ran a mercantile and shipping business and encouraged the Hawaiians to gather sandalwood for trade.

== Early life ==
Boki was the son of Kekuamanoha and Kamakahukilani. His father was a chief of Maui and grandson of Kekaulike, King of Maui. He was a younger brother of William Pitt Kalanimoku, but it was rumored that he was a son of Kahekili II. His original name was Kamāʻuleʻule ("The one who faints") and his nickname came from a variation of "Boss", the name of Kamehameha I's favorite dog which was a very common name for dogs in Hawaii at the time.

== Royal governor ==
Boki was appointed Royal Governor of Oahu and chief of the Waiʻanae District by Kamehameha I, and continued in his post under Kamehameha I's son Kamehameha II.

Boki and his wife Kuini Liliha (1802–1839) were leading members of a delegation to England led by King Kamehameha II and Queen Kamamalu in 1824. After the monarchs died from measles during the stay, Boki and his wife returned to Hawaii with Admiral Lord Byron aboard the British frigate, HMS Blonde, which bore the bodies of the late king and queen. En route, the ship stopped at Brazil and obtained several Arabica coffee trees, which Boki gave to ex-West Indies settler and agriculturalist John Wilkinson, to plant on the Chief's land in Oahu's Mānoa Valley. Wilkinson was never able to cultivate the strain for commercial production. He also transplanted South American native turkeys to Hawai'i and Rotuma, along with the Hawaiian transliteration of the Portuguese name for turkey, peru (pelehu in Hawaiian, perehu in Rotuman).

Emboldened by the voyage, Boki sought to trade on the fame it gave him. He moved a wood-frame house inland and opened a store and inn called the Blonde Hotel. He became unpopular with local missionaries because he sold liquor there. He stocked his bar with cheap but bad wine, saying it was good enough for visiting sailors. Like his other business ventures, it was not profitable for him, but perhaps was for his employees. One of them claimed the building in the 1830s, calling it the "Boki House".

== Catholicism ==
Boki agreed to the breaking of the kapu (the ancient system of strict rules) in 1819 and accepted the Protestant missionaries arriving in 1820. He had been baptized as a Catholic, along with his brother Kalanimoku, the previous year aboard the French vessel of Louis de Freycinet. Although he was one of the first chiefs to be baptized, when he married Liliha, he refused to marry her in church and, despite his conversion, was known to enjoy partaking of "sinful" and "immoral" treats, such as drinking okolehao (liquor made from kī root).

Queen regent Kaʻahumanu had become influenced by the Protestant missionaries in Honolulu and was baptized into the Congregational church. Heeding the advice of her Congregationalist ministers, Kaʻahumanu influenced King Kamehameha III to ban the Roman Catholic Church from the islands. Boki and Liliha were a constant threat to Kaʻahumanu and her hold on the boy-king and when she learned that they were among the first chiefs to convert to the Hawaii Catholic Church it angered her, since she wanted all the chiefs to accept Protestantism, an example she hoped all Hawaiians would follow. Torn in conflicting directions, the young king under the influence of Boki turned to alcohol in what was portrayed as a clear rejection of Christian standards of morality.

== Sandalwood ==
After restrictions on sandalwood trading placed by Kamehameha I lapsed, Boki immersed himself in the business. He grew rich, like many other chiefs, but the chiefs' lack of understanding of financial concepts caused him to become deeply indebted by 1829. When word reached him that New Hebrides, a faraway group of South Pacific islands, was heavily forested in sandalwood, he pulled together a fleet of two ships and set sail. It is known that he reached Rotuma in 1827 and also called at Erromango. However, when he failed to return to Hawaii it was assumed that he had perished at sea.

Despite the Hawaiian belief that he died during his sandalwood expedition, there is evidence that Boki was alive and well in Samoa in the year 1830. According to Marques' 1893 report, Boki's ship was wrecked in 1830 near Iva on the Samoan island of Savaiʻi where he rallied under the banner of the ambitious Samoan chief, Malietoa Vaiinupo. The Hawaiian embassy delegation sent to Samoa by King Kalakaua in 1886 learned that the two Prussian cannons from Boki's ships were indeed still to be found in Iva village along with "many of his descendants".

Before departing, Boki entrusted administration of Oahu to his wife and, subsequently, widow, Liliha who was made chiefess of Waiʻanae and governor of Oʻahu, until she tried to overthrow Kaʻahumanu. Her father Hoapili talked her out of it at the last minute, but she was, nevertheless, relieved of her duties. After Kaʻahumanu died in 1832, Liliha was described as no longer observant of the missionary rules.

Preceded by Lydia Nāmāhāna Piʻia?	Royal Governor of Oahu; 1825?– 1829	Succeeded by Kuini Liliha
