= French ship Uranie =

Seven ships of the French Navy have borne the name Uranie, in honour of Urania:

- Uranie (1788), a 40-gun frigate
- Uranie (1797), better known as Géographe of Baudin expedition of 1800 to 1802
- Uranie (1800), a 44-gun frigate, lead ship of her class
- Uranie (1803), a luger, wrecked in 1816
- Uranie (1811), a corvette, ran aground and wrecked on 14 February 1820 during a circumnavigational expedition under Louis de Freycinet (1817–1820)
- Uranie (1832), a 60-gun frigate
