= St. Michael the Archangel Church (Kailua-Kona, Hawaii) =

Church building in Hawaii, United States

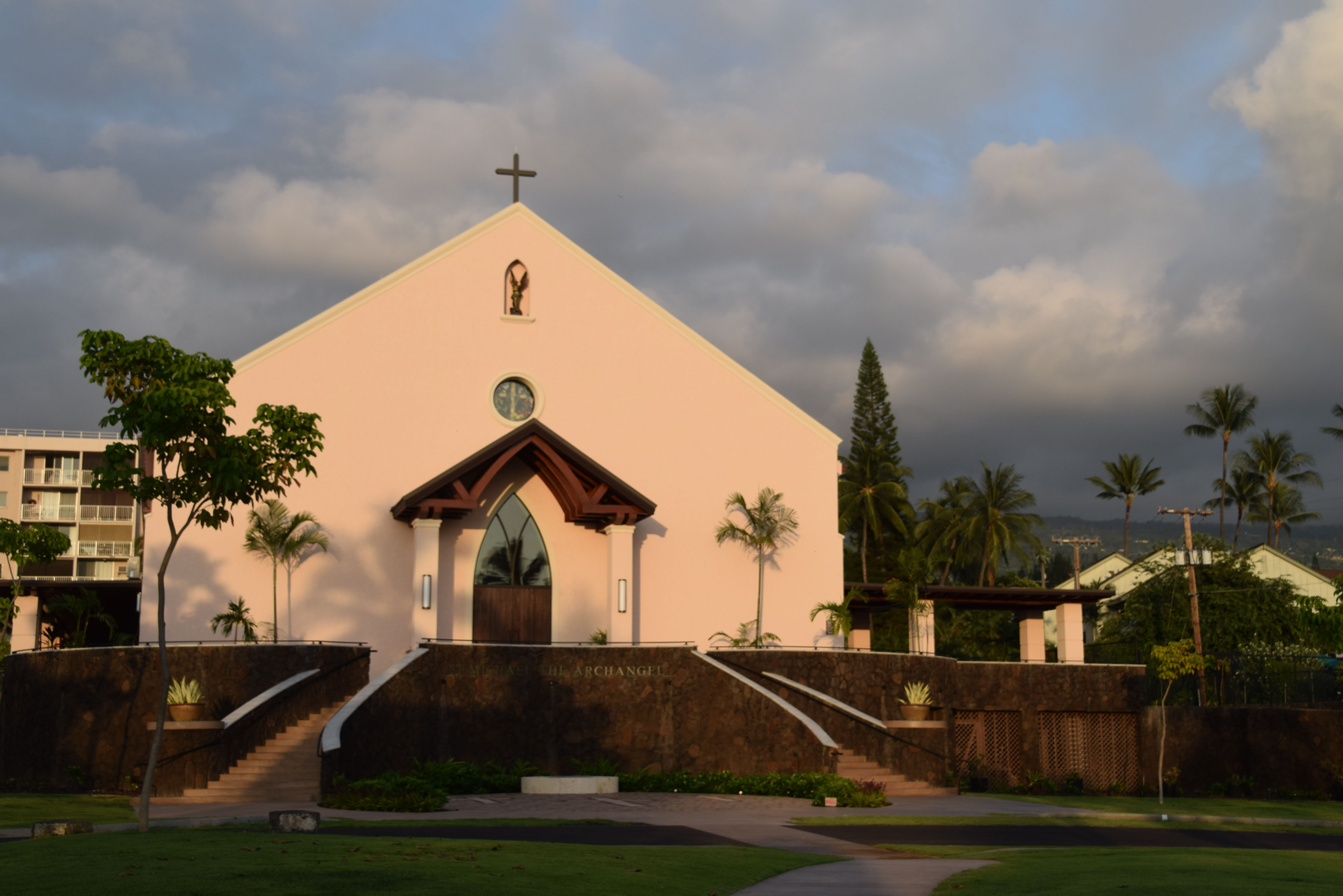
Saint Michael the Archangel Church 2016-

Saint Michael the Archangel Church 1850–2009

Saint Michael the Archangel Catholic Church is a parish of the Roman Catholic Church of Hawaiʻi in the United States. Located in Kailua-Kona on the Big Island of Hawaiʻi, 75-5769 Ali'i Drive, coordinates 19°38′13″N 155°59′28″W. The church falls under the jurisdiction of the Diocese of Honolulu and its bishop. On June 17, 1839, Kamehameha III declared religious freedom in the Kingdom in the Edict of Toleration. A mission named after Saint Michael the Archangel was founded in 1840, the first Catholic Church on the island. The first services were in a small grass hut. Governor John Adams Kuakini gave the land South of Mokuʻaikaua Church to the Catholic mission in 1841. The present church was completed in 1850 under Father Joachim Merechel. He was buried inside the church in 1859. In 1940 Father Benno Evers constructed a grotto of coral from Kailua Bay over the site of the original well.

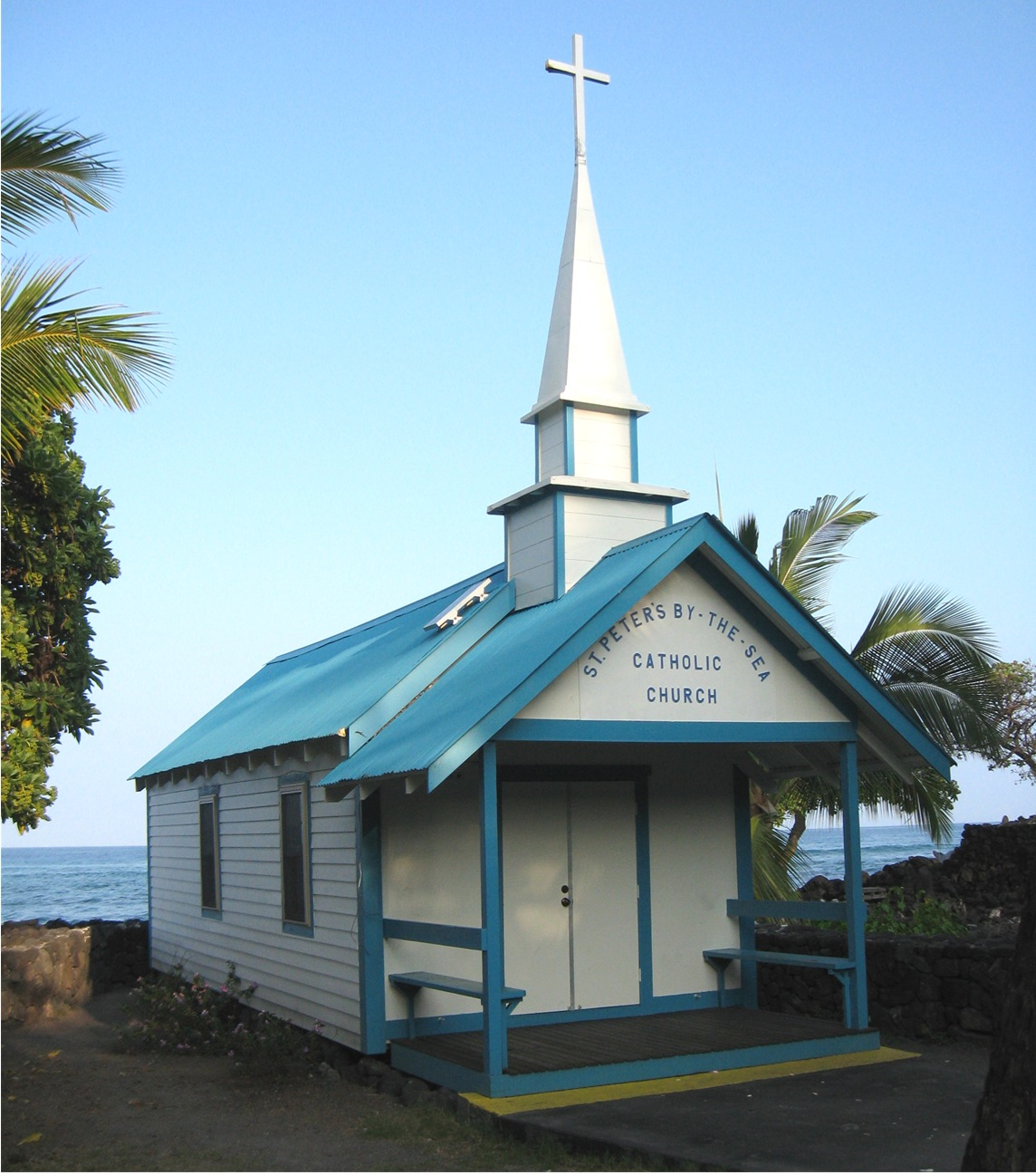
St. Peter by the Sea Church

The parish includes the mission churches of Immaculate Conception in Holualoa, St. Peter by the Sea Church (known as the "Little Blue Church") on Kahaluʻu bay, St. Paul in Kawanui and Holy Rosary in Kalaoa. The land beneath Holy Rosary was given to the Church by King Kalakaua in 1876.

The main church building was forced to close on September 24, 2007, due to lingering damage from the earthquake in the area almost a year prior, on October 15, 2006. The parish continued to hold Mass in a tent on the site. In 2009, the parish announced the church would be demolished in November 2009. A nearby building that served as a convent has also been demolished. Construction on a new church began in early 2013. In 2009, a book was published detailing the history of the 159-year-old church.
