= Aliʻi Drive =

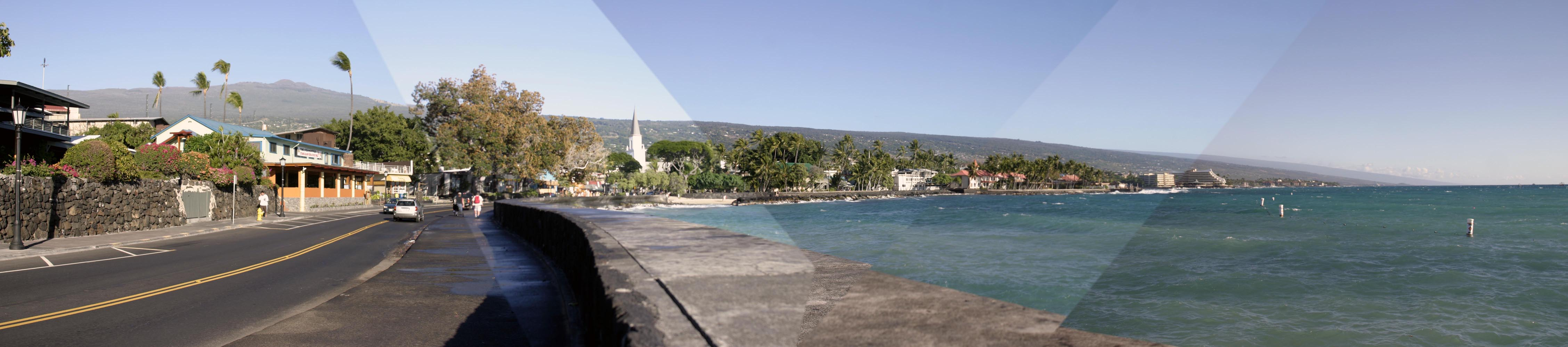
Aliʻi Drive is on Kaulua Bay (2007）

Aliʻi Drive is the main street of Kailua-Kona on the western side of the Island of Hawaii, United States. It is a coastal road that faces the Bay of Kailua, which is home to many historical sites, resort hotels, souvenir shops, markets and churches. Aliʻi Drive extends 12.5 miles south from the intersection of Kuakini Highway, just north of Kailua Pier in Kailua Kona, to the intersection of Hawaii Belt Road in Captain Cook, Hawaii. Ali'i Drive used to be 5.9 miles long, ending at the Keauhou Shopping Center in Keauhou. In 2013 the Hawaii County Council changed the name of the contiguous Mamalahoa Bypass Rd. to Ali'i Drive, thus extending Ali'i Drive length by 6.6 miles.

The northern part of Ali'i Drive in Kailua Kona is the busiest. At Kailua Pier, passengers from cruise ships come ashore by launches. Along the road are souvenir shops for tourists as well as local businesses, a farmers' market and many resort hotels of varying sizes, such as King Kamehameha's Kona Beach Hotel. The historical sites are: Ahuena Heiau where King Kamehameha spent his retired life, the Hulihee Palace which was used by the royal family of the Hawaiian Kingdom, Mokuaikaua Church which was the first church in Hawaii, and St. Michael's Catholic Church. The southerly part of Ali'i Drive south of Keauhou is largely rural and passes through agricultural lands and cattle ranches.

== See also ==
- Aliʻi, a Polynesian word meaning chiefly status
