= Pālamanui Community Forest =

Forest preserve in Hawaii, U.S.

- Pālamanui Dry Forest Preserve
- Interactive map of Pālamanui Community Forest
- Location: Hawaii
- Coordinates: 19°44′24″N 155°59′42″W
- Area: 706 acres (2.86 km^{2})

Pālamanui Community Forest (also known as the Pālamanui Forest Preserve) is a forest preserve located in Kailua-Kona on the island of Hawaii. It is collaboratively managed by two state government entities: the University of Hawaiʻi and the Hawaii Department of Land and Natural Resources Division of Forestry and Wildlife. The government's goal is preserving Hawaii's lowland tropical dry forest, protecting plant species that are endemic to the islands of Hawaii, and reducing invasive flora species.

== History ==
The Pālamanui Forest Preserve was established for the goal of preserving and protecting the native trees of Hawai’i. By 2030, Governor David Ige’s goal for the forest preserve is to replant, restore and conserve these native trees and their ecosystems across the Islands. The University of Hawaiʻi and the state Division of Forestry and Wildlife (DOFAW) agreed to use the dryland forest was as an "outdoor laboratory" learning center for surrounding communities to learn about Hawaii's ecosystem and native trees. The project for this preserved forest received $60,000 in legislative funding to contribute to the protection of wiliwili trees with fences and weed control.

== Ecology ==
Many plants located inside the Pālamanui Community Forest are endemic to the Hawaiian islands. These include wiliwili, halapepe, ko’oko’olau, kauila, noho kula, maʻaloa, and ‘aiea.

Several invasive plants are also located within the preserve. These include haole koa, silk oak, and fountain grass, with the goal of removing these invasive species to make room for Hawaii's native flora. The area spans 706 acres (2.86 square kilometers). The DLNR and the Hawaii community college manage the conservation area in partnership. A 55 acre parcel is fenced off to prevent the local wildlife from interfering with the endangered plants in the reserve, as well as to prevent the spreading of invasive plants.

== Culture ==
In the Hawaiian kingdom before the United States of America colonized Hawai’i – Big Island, native Hawaiians used an Ahupua’a system. This system was a traditional geologic and subdivision of land native Hawaiians used to divide land into different communities. In some beliefs, Ahupua’a originally started with ʻUmi-a-Līloa who was the son of the great high chief Līloa. As the belief goes, ʻUmi-a-Līloa took over control of the land and divided it into Ahupua’a for communities to utilize. Another belief comes from communities coming together to divide land equally to share water usage. With the Ahupua’a coming together for communities, each part of land started from the top of the volcano to the bottom where the shore meets the ocean. A drainage system is created for each piece of land for water usage, and each piece of land has its own mala, or cultivated area. For each land division, an aliʻi would overlook the Ahupua’a. In the Ahupua’a divisions, Palamanui’s ‘ili (small section of land) would be located in Hamanamana, Haleohiu, Maka'ula and Kau.
