= Kailua-Kona, Hawaii =

Census-designated place in Hawaii, US

Kailua-Kona
- Census Designated Place
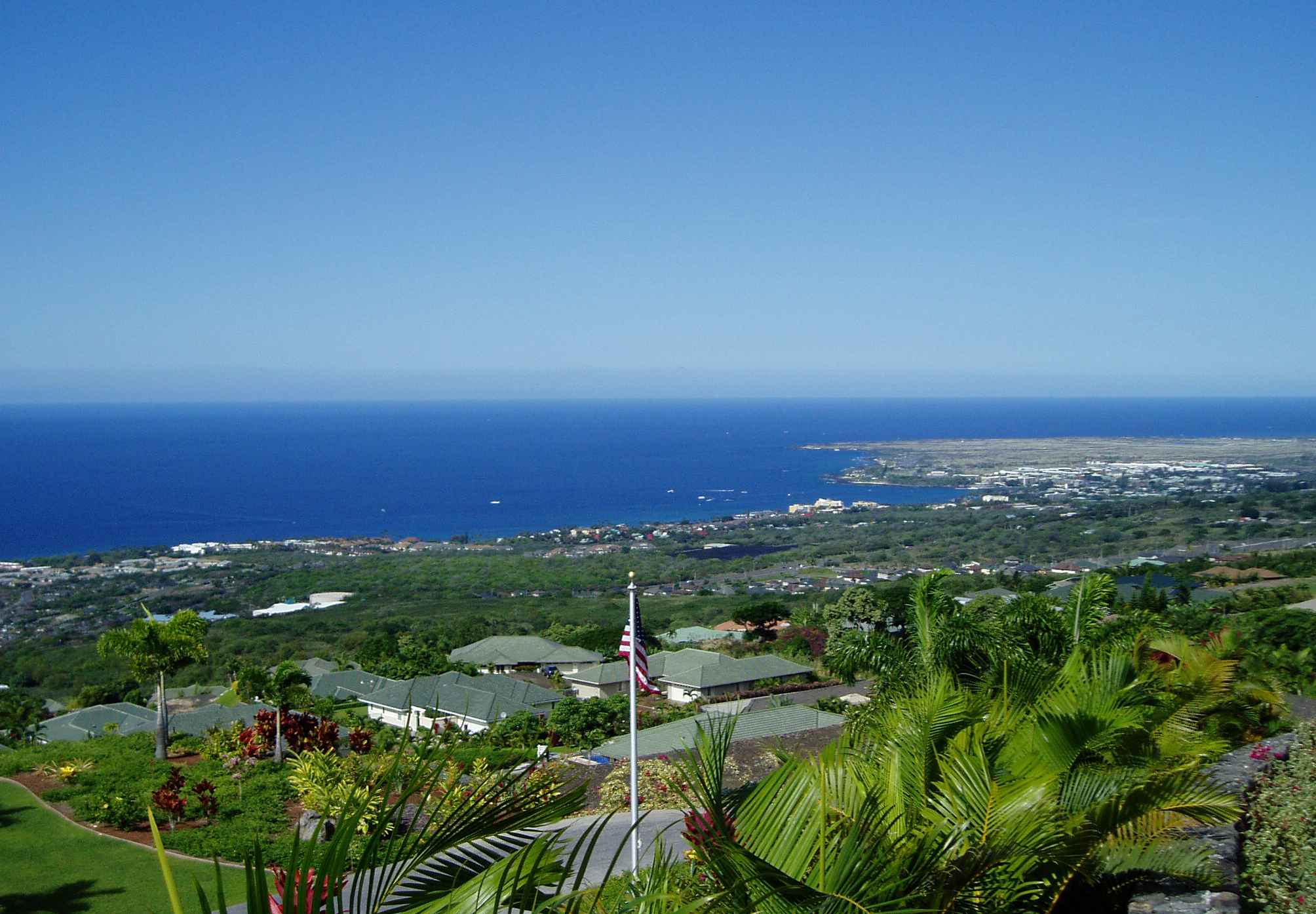
- Kailua-Kona from Holualoa

- Location in Hawaii County and the state of Hawaii

- Location within Hawaii
- Coordinates: 19°39′0″N 155°59′39″W

Area
  - Total: 19.19 sq mi (49.71 km^{2})
  - Land: 13.80 sq mi (35.73 km^{2})
  - Water: 5.40 sq mi (13.98 km^{2})
- Elevation: 7 ft (2.1 m)

Population (2020)
  - Total: 19,713
  - Density: 1,428.8/sq mi (551.66/km^{2})
- Time zone: UTC−10 (Hawaii–Aleutian)
- ZIP code: 96740
- Area code: 808
- FIPS code: 15-23000
- GNIS feature ID: 365355

Kailua-Kona is an unincorporated community and, under the name Kailua, a census-designated place (CDP) in Hawaii County, Hawaii, United States. It is most commonly referred to simply as Kona (a name it shares with the district to which it belongs), but also as Kona Town, and occasionally as Kailua (a name it shares with a community on the windward side of Oʻahu), thus its less frequent use. Kailua-Kona is the second-largest settlement on the island of Hawaii (after Hilo) and the largest on the island's west side, where it is the center of commerce and the tourist industry. Kailua-Kona is served by Kona International Airport, just to the north in the adjacent CDP of Kaiminani. The population was 19,713 at the 2020 census, up from 11,975 at the 2010 census.

Kailua-Kona was the closest major settlement to the epicenter of the 2006 Kiholo Bay earthquake.

The U.S. Census Bureau significantly altered Kailua CDP's boundaries for the 2020 census. The eastern portion of Kailua CDP became part of the neighboring Holualoa CDP, while the western portion of Holualoa became part of Kailua CDP.

== History ==
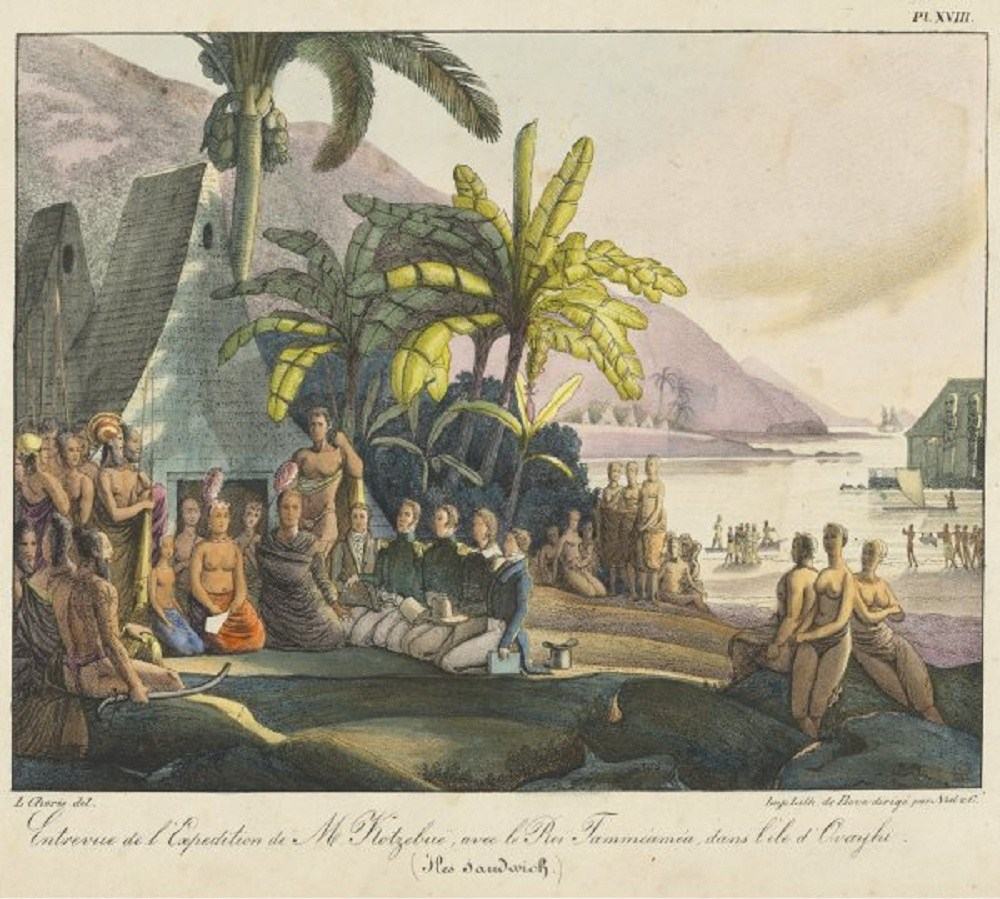
King Kamehameha's court at Kailua-Kona, receiving Otto von Kotzebue in 1816

The community was established by King Kamehameha I to be his seat of government when he was chief of Kona before he consolidated rule of the archipelago in 1795. It was later designated as the capital of the newly unified Kingdom of Hawaiʻi. The capital was later moved to Lāhainā, and then to Honolulu.

Royal fishponds at Kaloko-Honokōhau National Historical Park were the hub of unified Hawaiian culture. The town later functioned as a retreat of the Hawaiian royal family. Up until the late 1800s, Kailua-Kona was primarily a small fishing village. In 1820, the first Christian missionaries arrived and established churches and schools. In the late 20th and early 21st centuries, the region has undergone a real estate and construction boom fueled by tourism and investment.

In 2014, the Pālamanui Community Forest preserve was created in Kailua-Kona with a goal of preserving and protecting the native trees of Hawai’i.

== Geography ==
Kailua-Kona is located at 19°39′0″N 155°59′39″W (19.649973, −155.994028), along the shoreline of Kailua Bay and up the southern slope of Hualālai volcano. There are no major rivers or streams in Kailua-Kona or on the Kona side of Hawaii.

According to the United States Census Bureau, the Town has a total area of 39.9 square miles (103.3 km^{2}), of which 35.6 square miles (92.3 km^{2}) are land and 4.2 square miles (11.0 km^{2}), or 10.67%, are water.

Kailua-Kona is bordered to the north by Kalaoa, to the south by Holualoa, and to the west by the Pacific Ocean from Kailua Bay in the south to Honokohau Bay in the north. The Kailua-Kona postal code is 96740 (post office boxes – 96745).

=== Climate ===
Kailua-Kona has a tropical, semi-arid climate (Köppen BSh) with warm temperatures year-round, typical of its latitude in the tropics. It is the warmest place in the United States of America in January on average. The coolest month is February, with an average high temperature of 81.2 °F (27.3 °C), while the warmest is August, with an average high of 86.9 °F (30.5 °C). In addition to being the warmest place in the United States in January, it is also the city with the highest record low in the United States with an all-time low temperature of 56 °F (13 °C). Humidity is generally between 50% and 70%. Kailua-Kona is generally dry, with an average annual precipitation of 18.93 inches (481 mm). Mornings are typically clear, while thermal clouds created in the day raise the temperature during the day.

Climate data for Kona International Airport (1991–2020 normals, extremes 1998–present)
Month	Jan	Feb	Mar	Apr	May	Jun	Jul	Aug	Sep	Oct	Nov	Dec	Year
Record high °F (°C)	88 (31)	88 (31)	89 (32)	90 (32)	93 (34)	94 (34)	93 (34)	95 (35)	96 (36)	94 (34)	93 (34)	89 (32)	96 (36)
Mean daily maximum °F (°C)	81.4 (27.4)	81.5 (27.5)	82.2 (27.9)	83.2 (28.4)	83.9 (28.8)	85.2 (29.6)	86.1 (30.1)	87.3 (30.7)	86.9 (30.5)	86.2 (30.1)	84.4 (29.1)	82.3 (27.9)	84.2 (29.0)
Daily mean °F (°C)	75.0 (23.9)	75.0 (23.9)	75.9 (24.4)	77.2 (25.1)	78.3 (25.7)	79.6 (26.4)	80.5 (26.9)	81.5 (27.5)	81.0 (27.2)	80.3 (26.8)	78.4 (25.8)	76.2 (24.6)	78.2 (25.7)
Mean daily minimum °F (°C)	68.6 (20.3)	68.4 (20.2)	69.7 (20.9)	71.1 (21.7)	72.7 (22.6)	74.0 (23.3)	74.9 (23.8)	75.7 (24.3)	75.1 (23.9)	74.5 (23.6)	72.4 (22.4)	70.0 (21.1)	72.3 (22.4)
Record low °F (°C)	60 (16)	59 (15)	61 (16)	65 (18)	65 (18)	69 (21)	69 (21)	69 (21)	65 (18)	62 (17)	61 (16)	61 (16)	59 (15)
Average precipitation inches (mm)	1.35 (34)	1.17 (30)	0.97 (25)	0.63 (16)	0.64 (16)	0.76 (19)	0.49 (12)	0.54 (14)	0.54 (14)	0.89 (23)	0.83 (21)	1.06 (27)	9.87 (251)
Average precipitation days (≥ 0.01 in)	3.4	3.2	4.8	4.2	5.6	5.2	4.1	4.5	5.0	3.8	3.1	3.5	50.4
Source: NOAA

Climate data for Kailua Kona, Hawaii (1981–2010 normals)
Month	Jan	Feb	Mar	Apr	May	Jun	Jul	Aug	Sep	Oct	Nov	Dec	Year
Record high °F (°C)	90 (32)	90 (32)	91 (33)	90 (32)	92 (33)	92 (33)	93 (34)	95 (35)	94 (34)	94 (34)	92 (33)	89 (32)	95 (35)
Mean daily maximum °F (°C)	81.6 (27.6)	81.2 (27.3)	82.2 (27.9)	83.0 (28.3)	83.5 (28.6)	85.0 (29.4)	86.0 (30.0)	86.9 (30.5)	86.8 (30.4)	86.0 (30.0)	84.2 (29.0)	82.5 (28.1)	84.1 (28.9)
Mean daily minimum °F (°C)	68.2 (20.1)	68.0 (20.0)	70.0 (21.1)	70.6 (21.4)	71.6 (22.0)	73.6 (23.1)	74.1 (23.4)	75.1 (23.9)	74.6 (23.7)	74.1 (23.4)	71.8 (22.1)	69.4 (20.8)	71.8 (22.1)
Record low °F (°C)	56 (13)	58 (14)	58 (14)	60 (16)	64 (18)	62 (17)	65 (18)	58 (14)	57 (14)	57 (14)	62 (17)	60 (16)	56 (13)
Average precipitation inches (mm)	2.41 (61)	1.50 (38)	1.78 (45)	1.36 (35)	2.00 (51)	0.97 (25)	0.70 (18)	1.39 (35)	0.84 (21)	1.34 (34)	1.28 (33)	2.82 (72)	18.39 (468)
Source: WRCC/NCDC

Vog can cover parts of the Kona coast from time to time depending on the activity of the Kilauea volcano and the island winds. Kailua-Kona is located on the leeward side of the Hualalai Volcano, sheltering the town from wind and rain.

== Demographics ==
Historical population
Census	Pop.	Note	%±
2000	9,893		—
2010	11,975		21.0%
2020	19,713		64.6%
U.S. Decennial Census

=== 2000 Census data ===
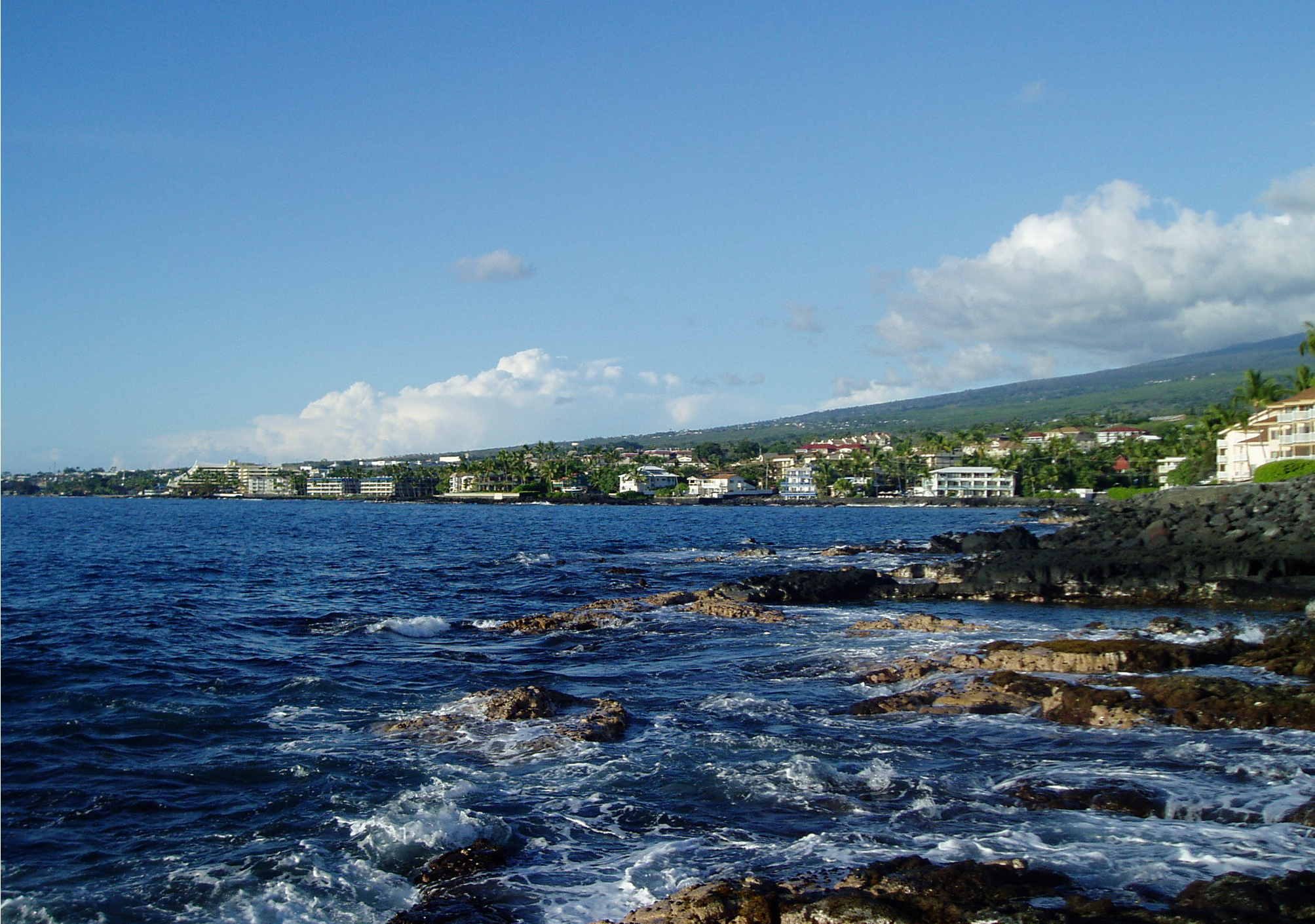
Kailua from southern shore

As of the census of 2000, there were 9,870 people, 3,537 households, and 2,429 families residing in Kailua-Kona. The population density was 278.0 inhabitants per square mile (107.3/km^{2}). There were 4,322 housing units at an average density of 121.7 units per square mile (47.0 units/km^{2}). The racial makeup of the city was 38.7% White, 0.5% Black or African American, 0.5% Native American, 18.3% Asian, 13.2% Pacific Islander, 1.9% from other races, and 27.07% from two or more races. 10.2% of the population were Hispanic or Latino of any race.

There were 3,537 households, out of which 35.0% had children under the age of 18 living with them, 49.6% were married couples living together, 13.6% had a female householder with no husband present, and 31.3% were non-families. 22.6% of all households were made up of individuals, and 7.2% had someone living alone who was 65 years of age or older. The average household size was 2.78 and the average family size was 3.26.

In Kailua-Kona, 27.3% of the population was under the age of 18, 9.0% was from 18 to 24, 28.8% from 25 to 44, 24.9% from 45 to 64, and 10.0% was 65 years of age or older. The median age was 36 years. For every 100 females, there were 98.8 males. For every 100 females aged 18 and over, there were 95.8 males.

The median income for a household in the city was $40,874, and the median income for a family was $46,657. Males had a median income of $30,353 versus $26,471 for females. The per capita income for the CDP was $20,624. 10.8% of the population and 6.5% of families were below the poverty line. Out of the total population, 11.9% of those under the age of 18 and 3.9% of those 65 and older were living below the poverty line.

== Economy ==
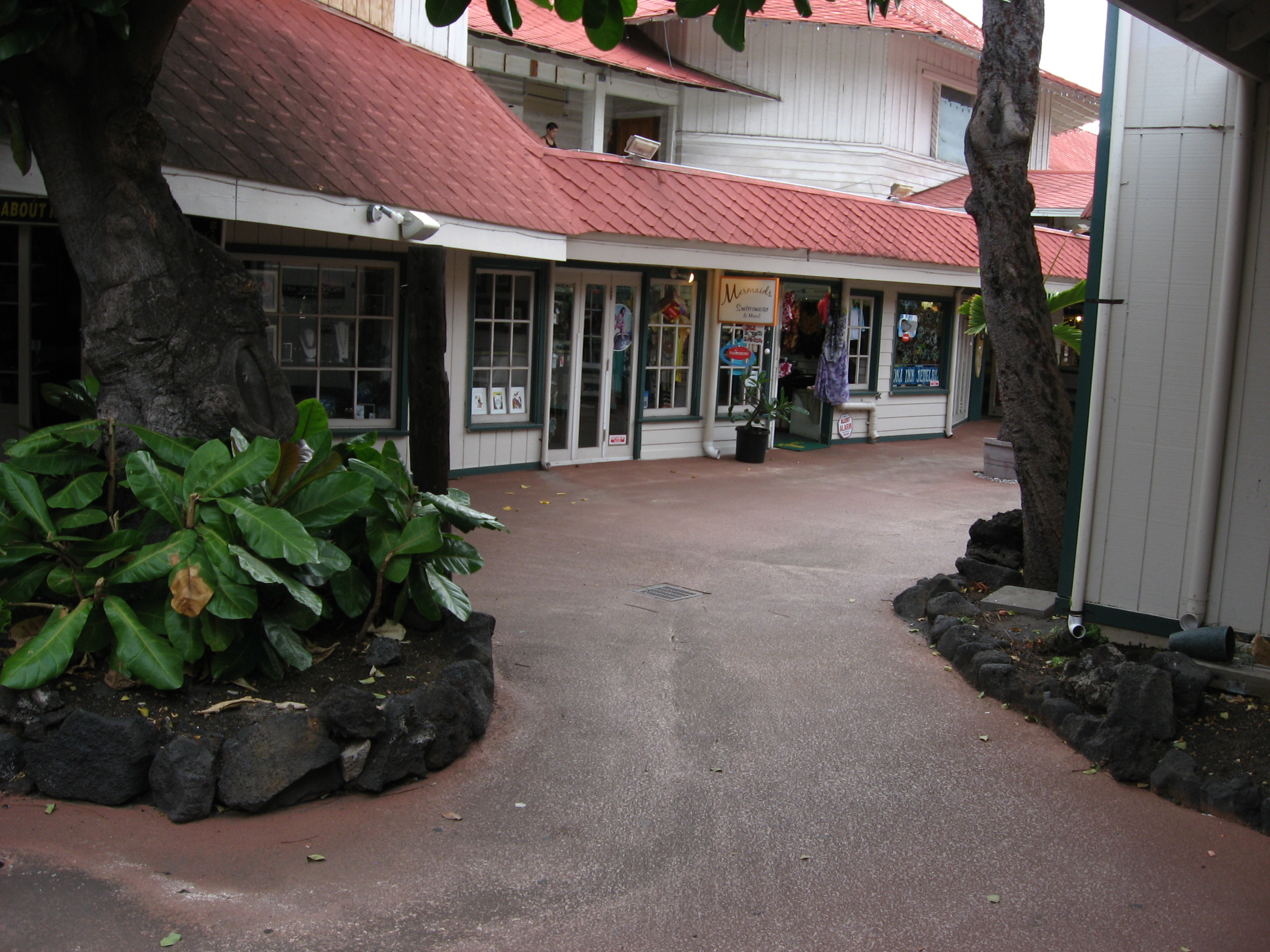
Kailua Inn Shopping Village

Kailua-Kona saw an economic downturn during the 2008 national financial crisis but in the early 2010s has seen significant growth and economic development. Tourism also saw a downturn in the late 2000s but has since seen some resurgence. Visitor air arrivals alone increased about 160% from 2010 to 2017.

The University of Hawaiʻi held its first classes at the new Hawaii Community College Palamanui Campus in 2015.

Since the early 2000s the Kona side had seen significant amounts of vog from Puʻu ʻŌʻō and Kīlauea, but that changed in May 2018 when Kilauea largely ceased its emissions. Kailua-Kona's air is clearer than it has been in decades.

== Attractions and events ==
Kailua-Kona is the host of the annual Ironman World Championship triathlon, the annual Kona Coffee Festival, and the Hawaiian International Billfish Tournament.

Kona coffee is the variety of Coffea arabica cultivated on the slopes of Hualālai and Mauna Loa in the North and South Kona Districts. The Kona Historical Society manages two coffee related historical sites: the Kona Coffee Living History Farm and the H.N. Greenwell Store Museum just south of Kailua-Kona.

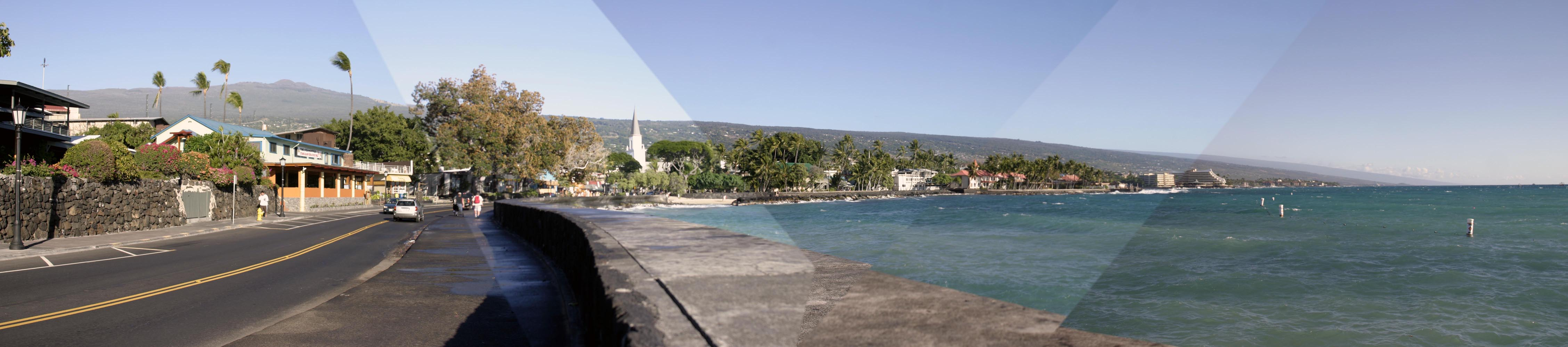
Ali'i Drive along Kailua Bay

Ali'i Drive, Kailua's oceanfront downtown street, starts at Kailua-Kona Pier. It has also been given the designation as a Hawaii Scenic Byway called the "Royal Footsteps Along the Kona Coast". This byway features archaeological sites that have survived for hundreds of years.

North of the pier is the Kamakahonu royal residence and Ahuʻena Heiau, and nearby now stands the King Kamehameha's Kona Beach Hotel. Another royal residence is Huliheʻe Palace, used by members of the Hawaiian royal family until 1914. The Historic Kona Inn and other shops are on the street.

Churches on the drive include Mokuaikaua Church, Hawaiʻi's first Christian church (the congregation began in 1820), Saint Michael the Archangel Catholic Church, and Living Stones Church, a historical structure built after Mokuaikaua and used as a Christian Missionary landing location in the 1800–1900. Parks include La'aloa Bay (also known as Magic Sands or White Sands Beach) and Kahaluʻu Bay, a popular snorkeling location.

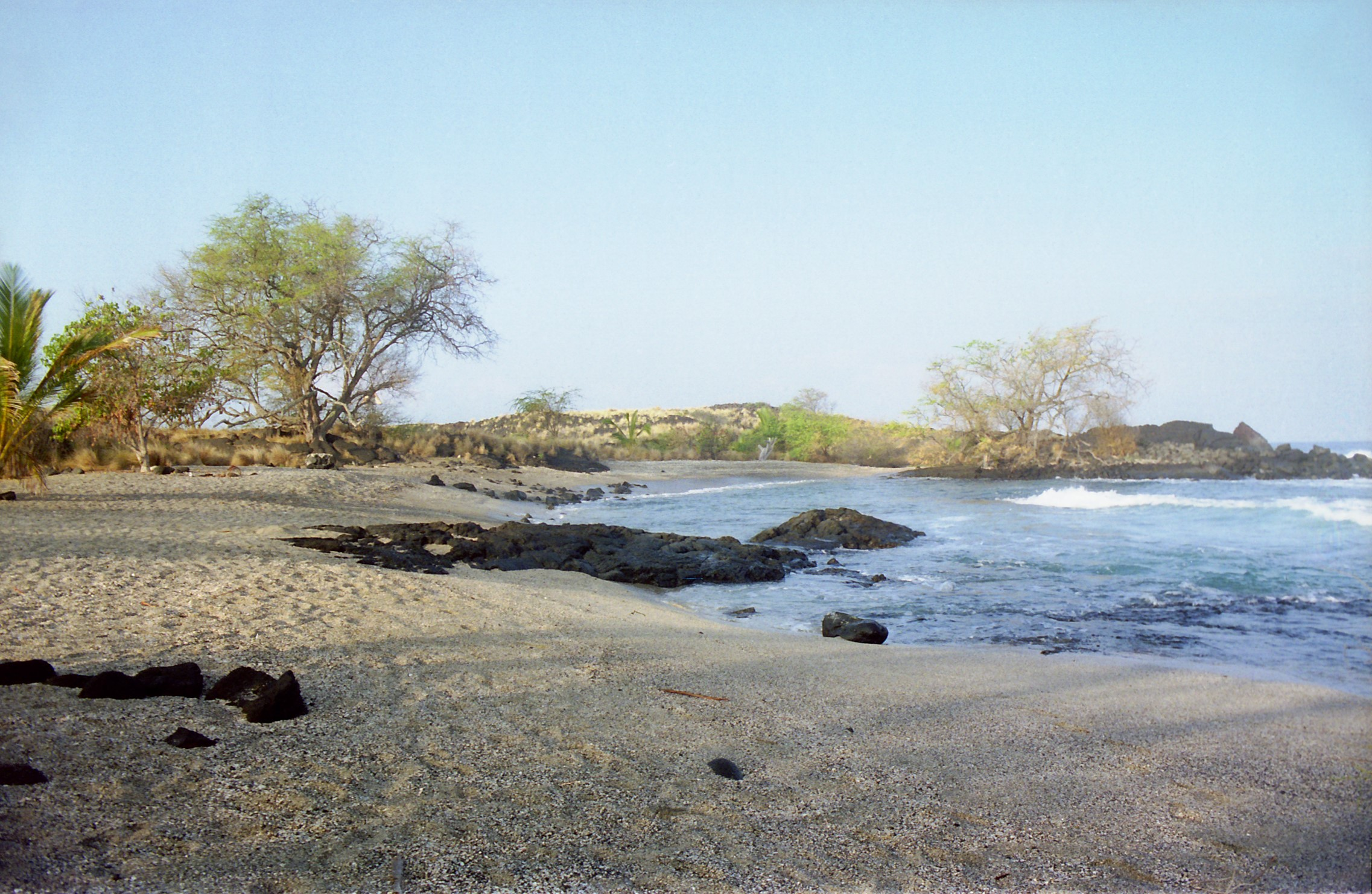
Old Airport Beach, north of Kailua

Boat tours that allow tourists to watch dolphins and whales, swim with manta rays, turtles and fish in the ocean usually depart from the Kailua-Kona pier or nearby Honokohau and Keauhou harbors.

== Media ==
Kailua-Kona is served by television station KLEI and by the newspaper West Hawaii Today, which is owned by Canadian publisher Black Press Media (Black Press Group Ltd.)—also known simply as Black Press—whose headquarters are in Surrey, British Columbia, Canada.

== Education ==
The Hawaii Department of Education operates public schools. Kealakehe Elementary School, Kahakai Elementary School, Kealakehe Intermediate School, and Kealakehe High School are in the Kailua CDP.

The Hawaii State Public Library System operates the Kailua-Kona Library.

The University of the Nations, a Youth With A Mission training center, is in Kailua-Kona.

== Transportation ==
Kona International Airport is the area airport.

== Notable residents ==
- Pepper, a reggae rock band
- Yoshi Oyakawa, swimmer and Olympic medalist
- Alicia Vela-Bailey, American stunt performer, stunt double, actress, dancer, and choreographer
