= Huliheʻe Palace =

Historic building in Kailua, Hawaii

- U.S. National Register of Historic Places
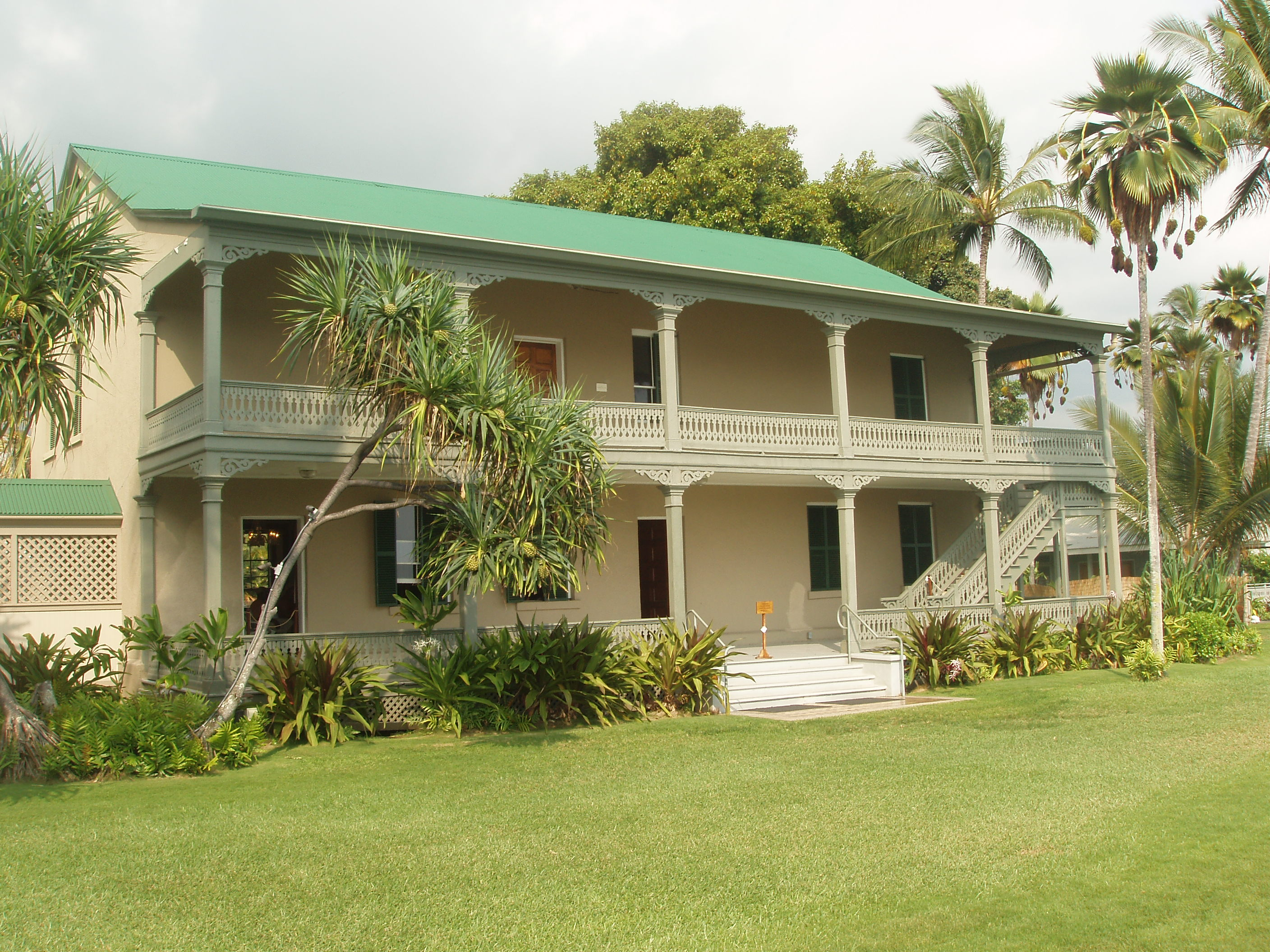

- Location within Hawaii
- Location: 75-5718 Aliʻi Drive, Kailua-Kona, Hawaii
- Coordinates: 19°38′22″N 155°59′40″W
- Area: 1 acre (0.40 ha)
- Built: 1838
- Architect: John Adams Kuakini
- NRHP reference No.: 73000653
- Added to NRHP: May 25, 1973

The Huliheʻe Palace is located in historic Kailua-Kona, Hawaiʻi, on Ali'i Drive. The former vacation home of Hawaiian royalty, it was converted to a museum run by the Daughters of Hawaiʻi, showcasing furniture and artifacts. It is located at 75–5718 Aliʻi Drive, Kailua-Kona.

== History ==
The palace was originally built out of lava rock by John Adams Kuakini (governor of the island of Hawaiʻi) during the Hawaiian Kingdom. When he died in 1844 he left it to his hānai (adopted) son William Pitt Leleiohoku I, the son of Prime Minister William Pitt Kalanimoku. Leleiohoku died in the measles epidemic of 1848 and left it to his son John William Pitt Kīnaʻu, but he died young and the palace went to his mother Princess Ruth Keʻelikōlani. Ruth made Huliheʻe her chief residence for most of her life, but she preferred to sleep in a grass hut on the palace grounds rather than in the palace. She invited all of the reigning monarchs to vacation at Huliheʻe, from Kamehameha III to Liliʻuokalani. Ruth died and left the palace to her cousin and sole heir Princess Bernice Pauahi Bishop.

It was later sold to King Kalākaua and Queen Kapiʻolani. Kalākaua renamed the palace Hikulani Hale, which means "House of the Seventh ruler," referring to himself, the seventh monarch of the monarchy that began with King Kamehameha I. In 1885, King Kalākaua had the palace plastered over the outside to give the building a more refined appearance. After Kalākaua's death it passed to Kapiʻolani who left Huliheʻe Palace to her two nephews, Prince Jonah Kūhiō Kalanianaʻole Piʻikoi and Prince David Kawānanakoa.

In 1927, the Daughters of Hawaiʻi, a group dedicated to preserving the cultural legacy of the Hawaiian Islands, working alongside the Territory of Hawaii and the palace custodian Stella Maude Jones worked to restore Huliheʻe Palace and turned it into a museum. It was added to the National Register of Historic Places listings on the island of Hawaii in 1973 as site 73000653.

The palace's walls and ceiling had slight cracks following the 2006 Kiholo Bay earthquake that was centered on the Kohala coast.

== Gallery ==
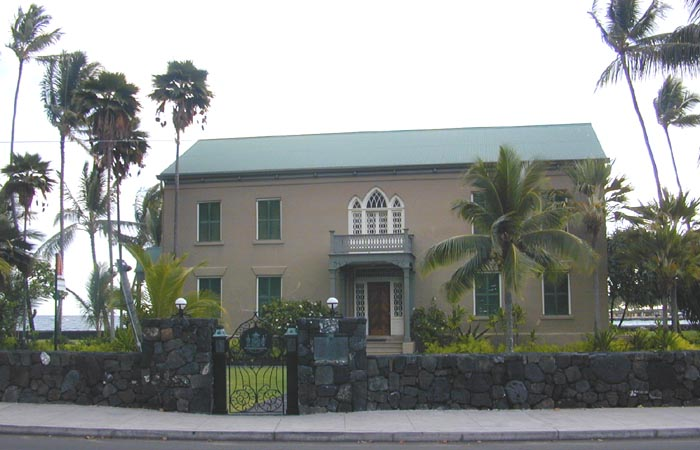
Huliheʻe Palace, seen from Aliʻi Drive.

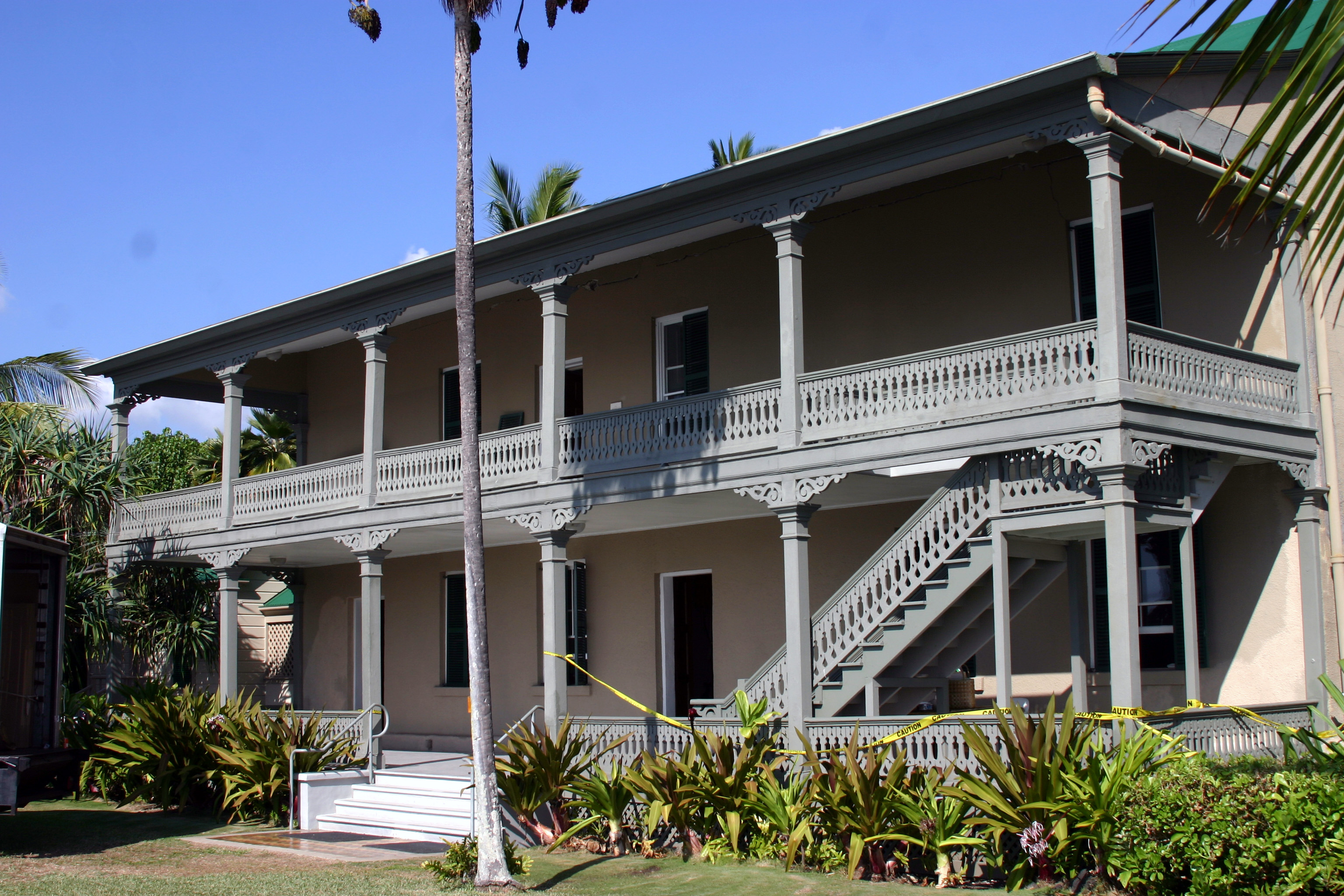
Huliheʻe Palace after 2006 earthquake. (01/2007)

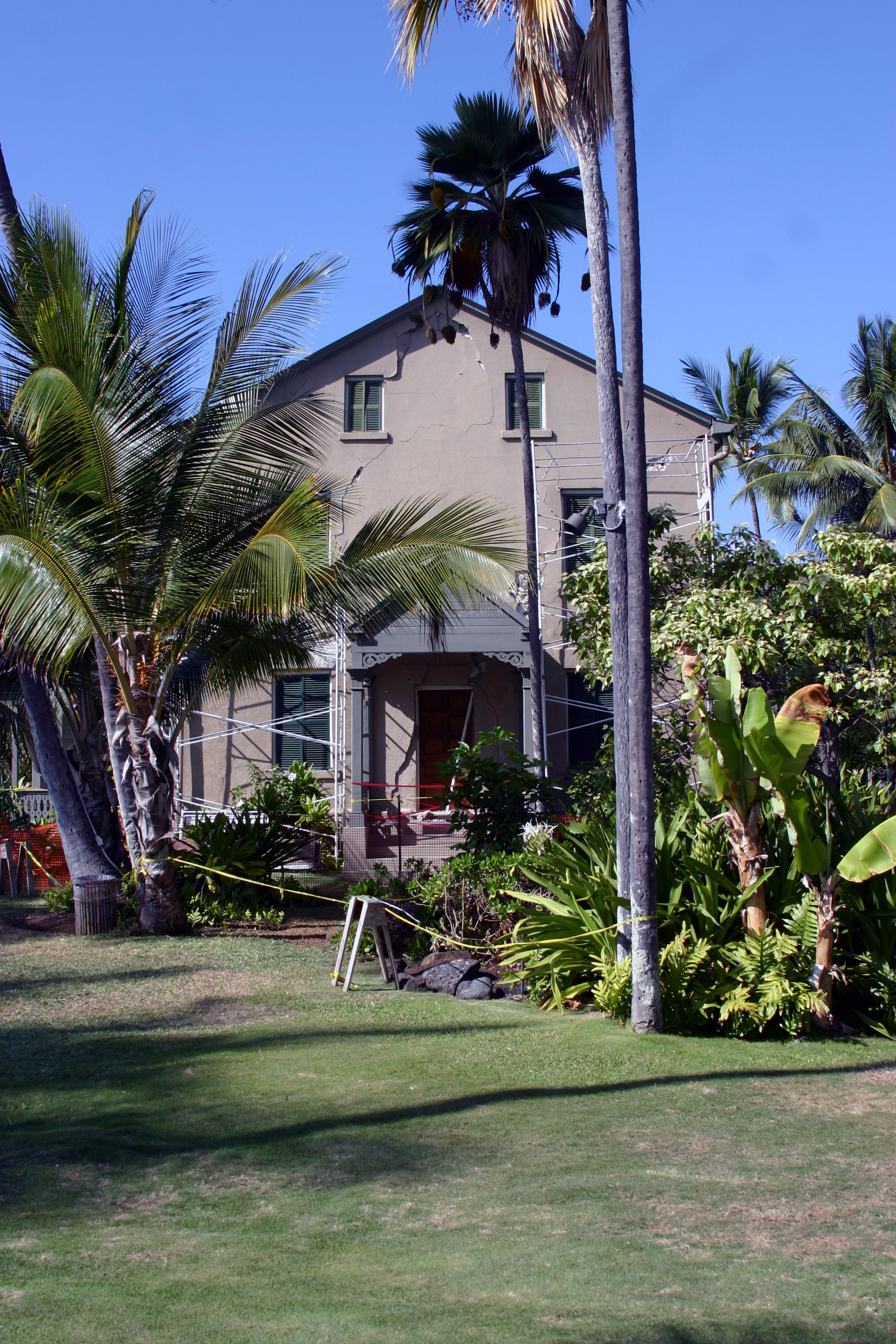
South wall after 2006 earthquake. (01/2007)

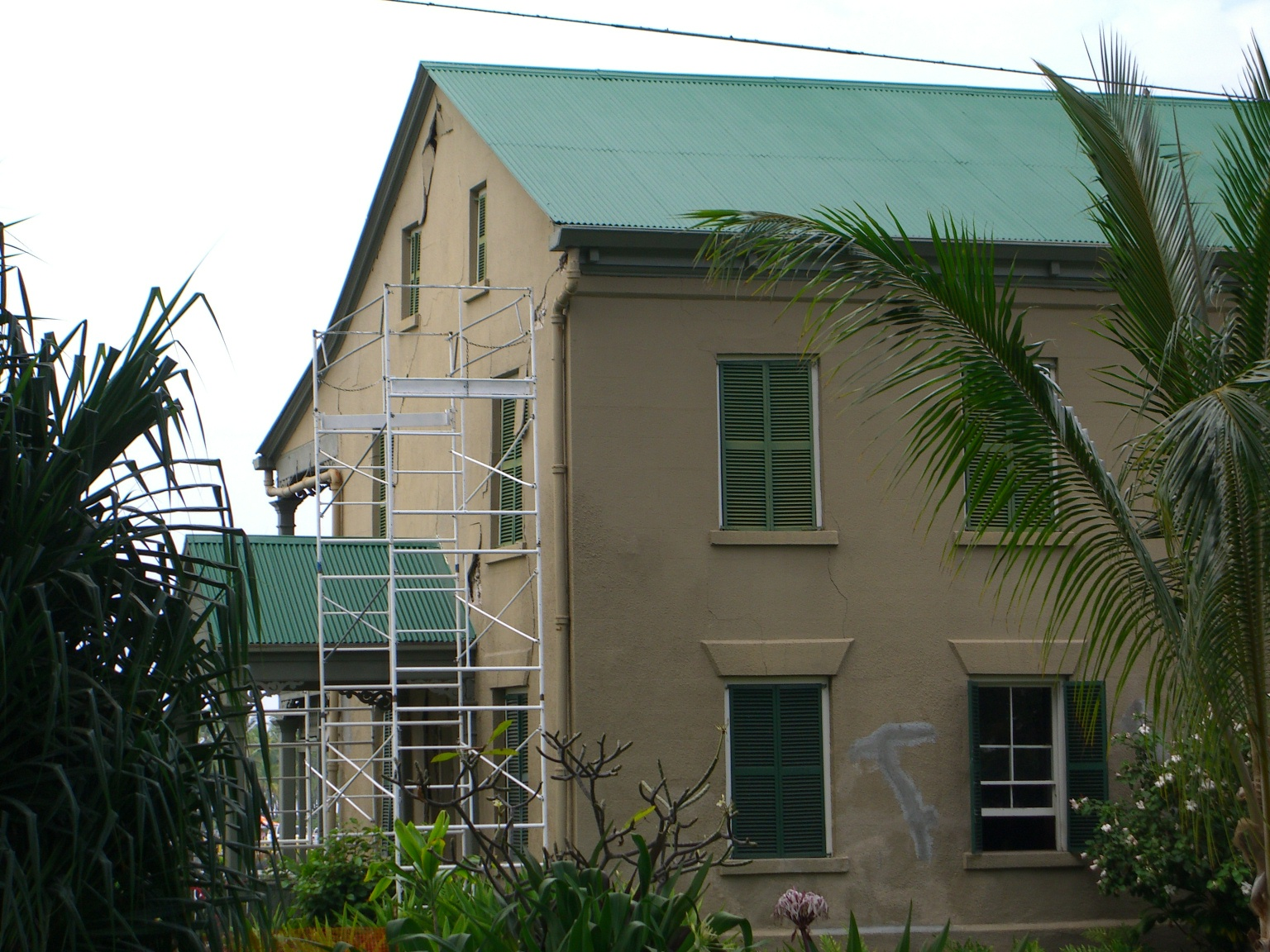
Earthquake damage, as of January 2007.

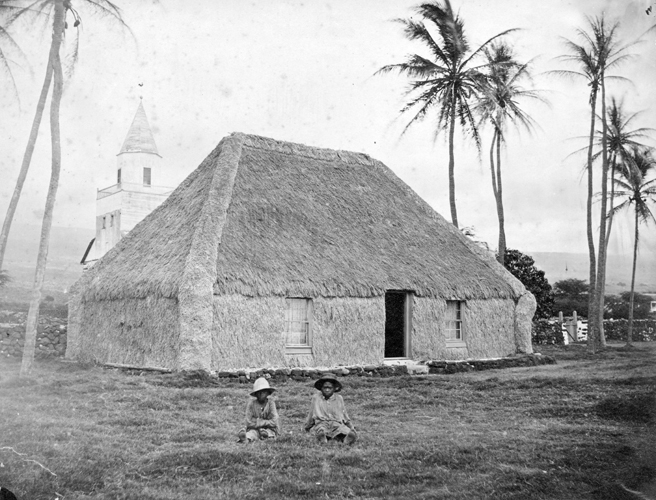
Princess Ruth's grass house that stood on the palace grounds.

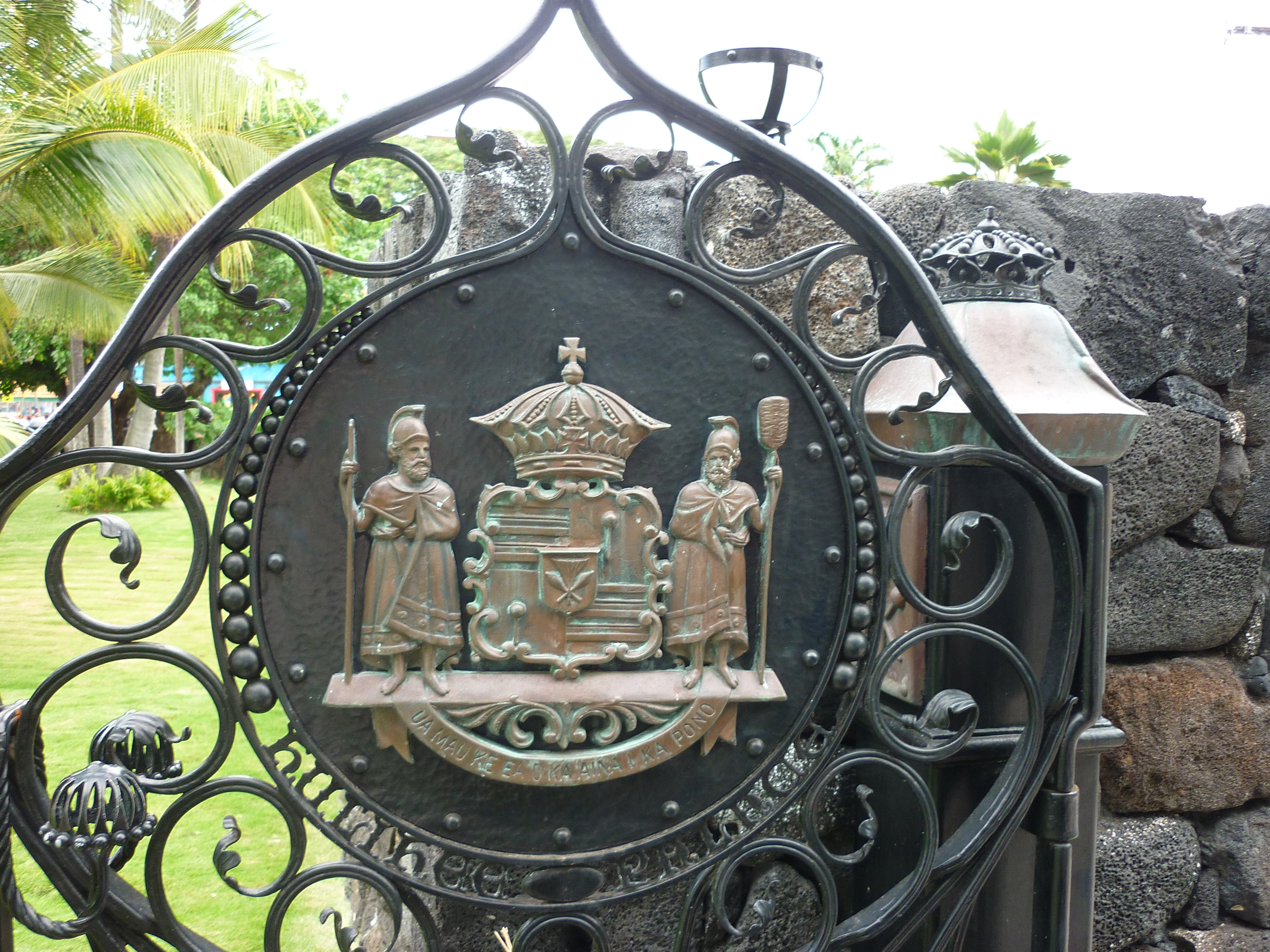
Gate with royal crest at Huiliheʻe Palace. (10/2012)

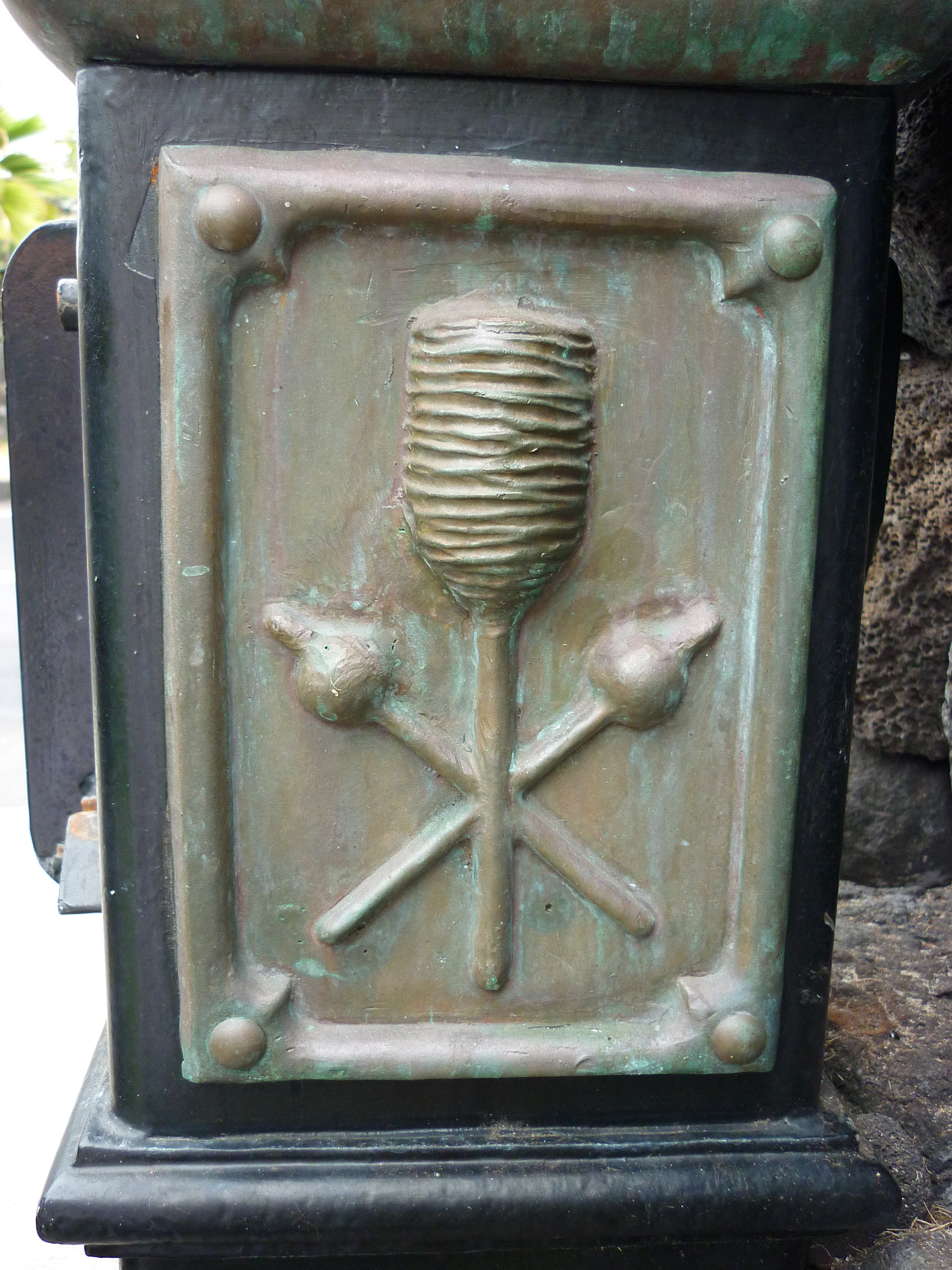
Gate post ornament with Kahili motif at Huliheʻ Palace. (10/2012)

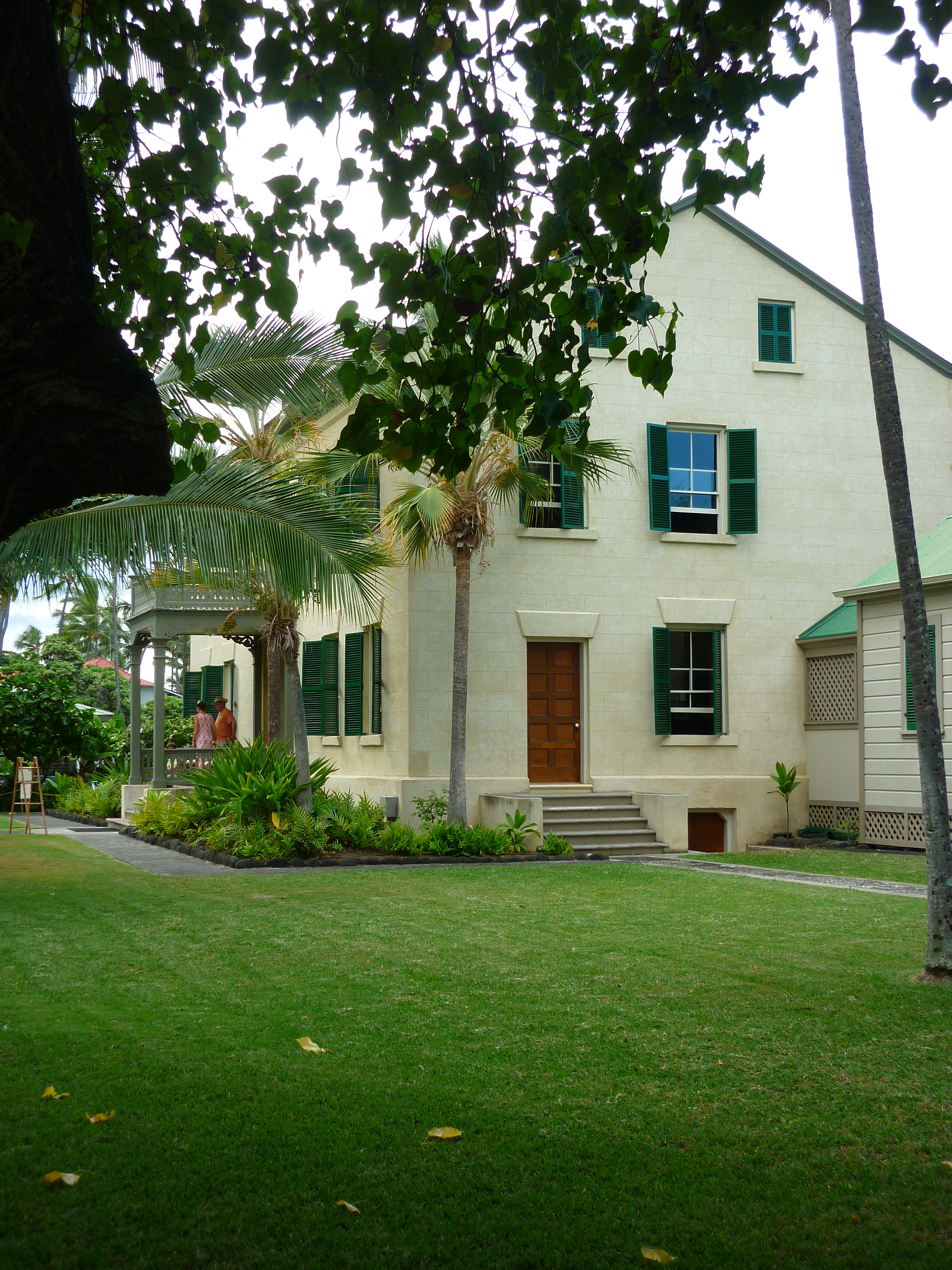
Side view of Huliheʻ Palace. (10/2012)

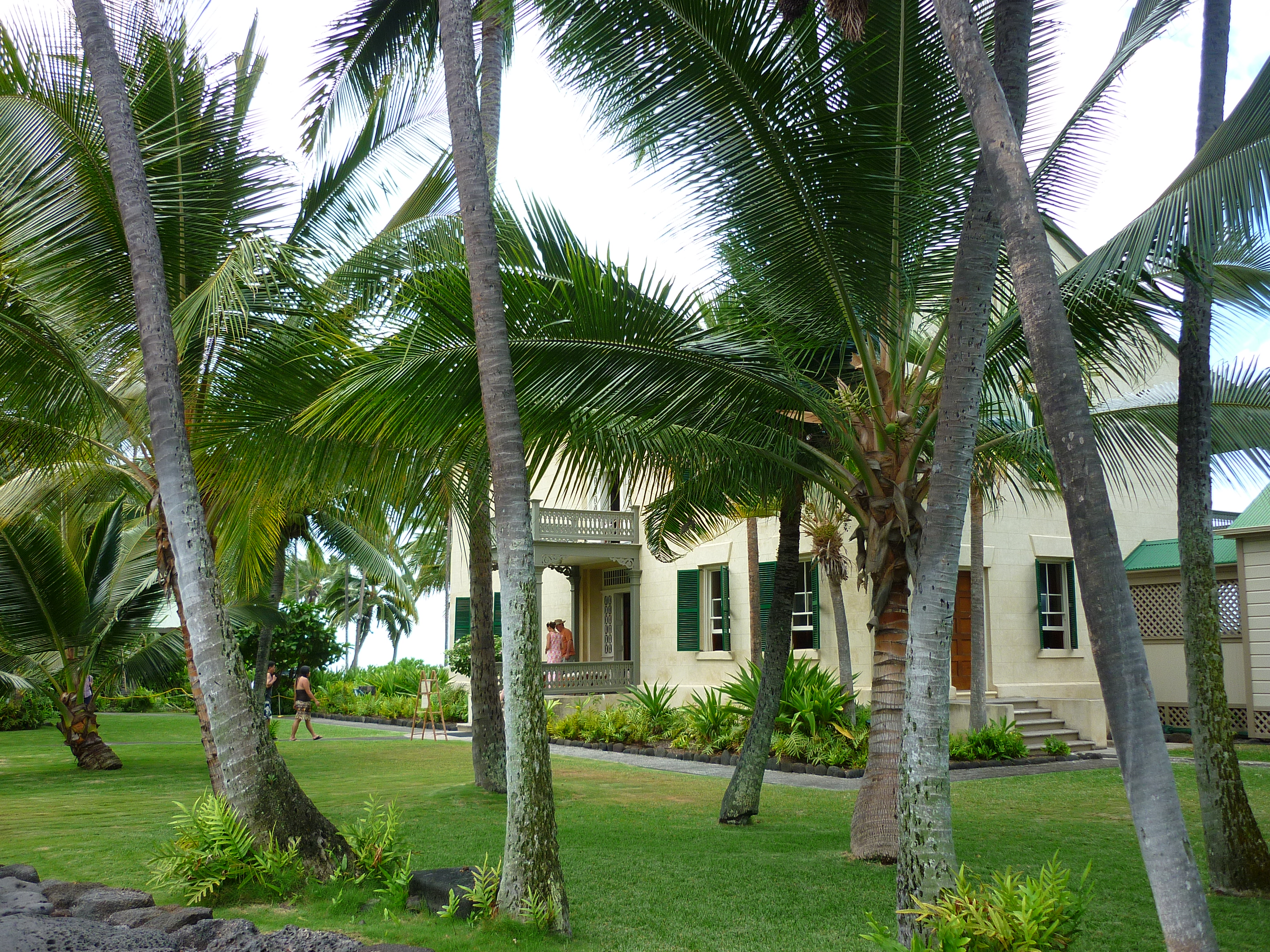
Side view of Huliheʻ Palace through the palm trees. (10/2012)

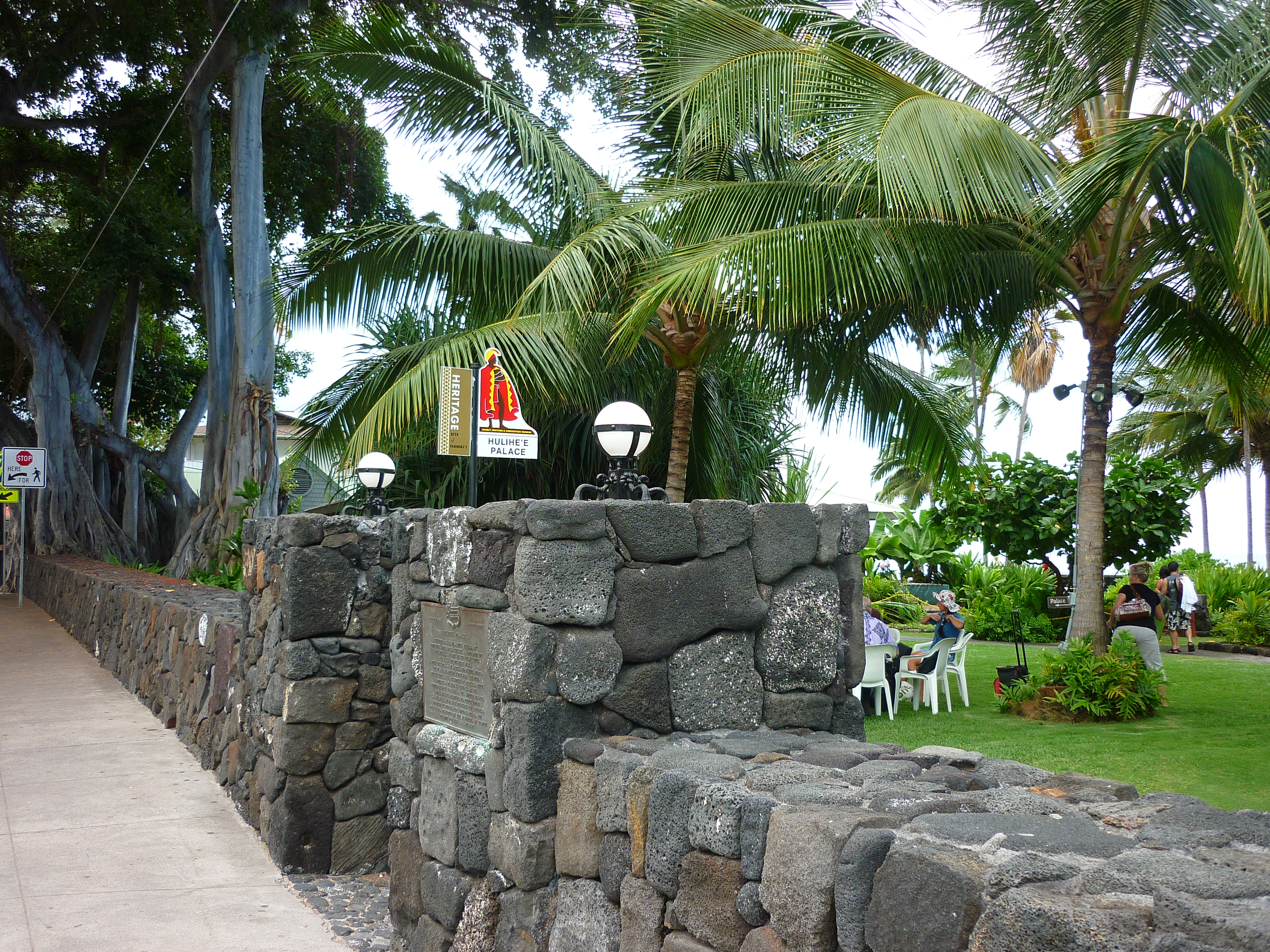
Stone wall and gate of Huliheʻ Palace with musicians in the yard. (10/2012)

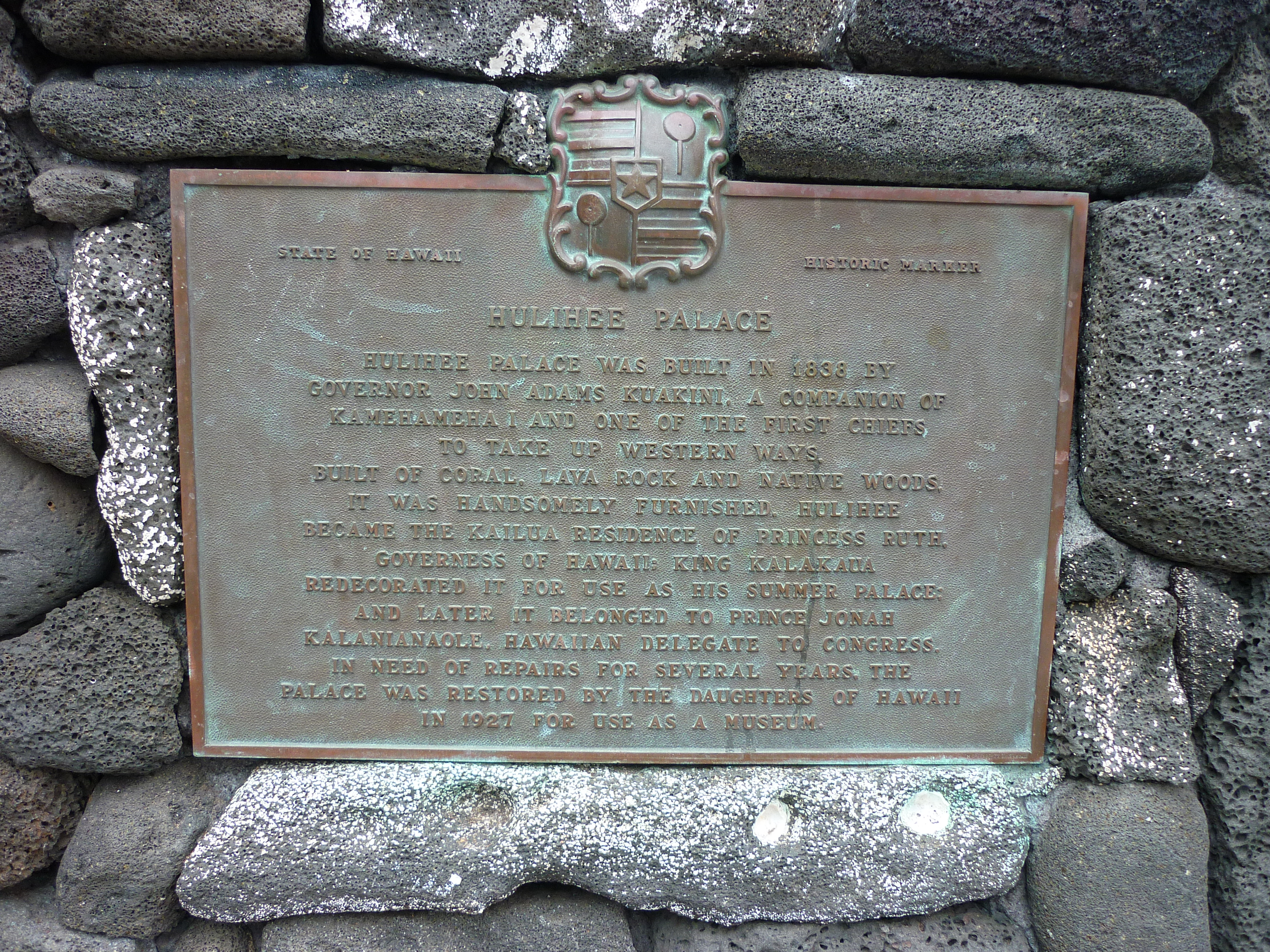
Historic marker at Huliheʻ Palace. (10/2012)
