= 2006 Kiholo Bay earthquake =

6.7 magnitude earthquake in Hawaii

2006 Kīholo Bay earthquake
- UTC time: 2006-10-15 17:07:49
- ISC event: 11122134
- USGS-ANSS: ComCat
- Local date: October 15, 2006
- Local time: 07:07:49 Hawaii Standard Time
- Magnitude: 6.7 M_{d}
- Depth: 38.2 kilometers (24 mi)
- Epicenter: 19.877°N 155.935°W
- Type: Oblique-normal
- Areas affected: Hawaii, United States
- Max. intensity: MMI VIII (Severe)
- Tsunami: Yes
- Aftershocks: 6.1 M_{w} Oct 15 at 17:14 UTC
- Casualties: Several injured

The 2006 Kīholo Bay earthquake occurred on October 15 at 07:07:49 local time with a magnitude of 6.7 and a maximum Mercalli intensity of VIII (Severe). The shock was centered 21 kilometers (13 mi) southwest of Puakō and 21 km (13 mi) north of Kailua-Kona, Hawaiʻi, just offshore of the Kona Airport, at a depth of 38.2 km (23.7 mi). It produced several aftershocks, including one that measured a magnitude of 6.1 seven minutes after the main shock. The Pacific Tsunami Warning Center measured a nondestructive tsunami of 10 cm (4 in) on the coast of the Big Island.

== Tectonic setting ==
The island of Hawaii is affected by earthquakes related to three main causes. Some are associated with the movement of magma and tend to be shallow focus (less than 5 km (3.1 mi) depth). The largest earthquakes are those caused by overall gravitational spreading of the volcano, whether within the volcano's flanks or at the base of the volcanic pile. They tend to have focal depths in the range 5 to 13 km (3.1 to 8.1 mi). The final group of earthquakes are those caused by flexure of the oceanic lithosphere underlying the island as a result of loading by the volcano. The type of stresses within the flexing lithosphere depends on depth relative to the neutral surface, with radial compression and associated tangential tension below about 22 km (14 mi) and radial tension and tangential compression above that level. Earthquakes of this type can have focal depths as deep as 60 km (37 mi).

== Earthquake ==
The earthquake had a hypocentral depth of 38.2 km (23.7 mi) and a focal mechanism of normal faulting. The depth shows that it was in the mantle lithosphere, beneath the neutral surface with a mechanism consistent with tangential tension. The largest aftershock was significantly shallower at 18 km (11 mi) and had a focal mechanism of reverse faulting. The depth and mechanism are consistent with tangential compression above the neutral surface.

Modified Mercalli Intensities were VII–VIII (Very strong–Severe) on the western side of the island of Hawaii, and VI (Strong) on the eastern side of Maui. Intensity V (Moderate) shaking was felt all the way to Oʻahu, where patches of moderate damage were reported. The earthquake caused property damage, injuries, landslides, power outages, and airport delays and closures. Governor Linda Lingle issued a disaster declaration for the entire state.

=== Damage ===
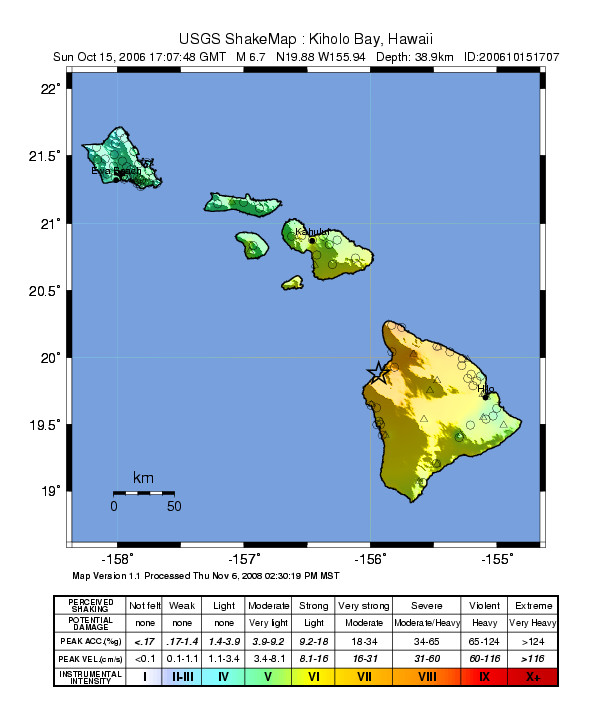
USGS ShakeMap for the event.

The most severe damage caused by the earthquake was focused on the north and western sides of the island of Hawaii. Damage was also quite heavy on the eastern side of Maui, and minor damage spread all the way out to western Oʻahu, 170 miles (270 km) away from the earthquake's epicenter. On the Big Island, many houses had large cracks and broken windows, and at least 61 buildings were destroyed and red-tagged by officials. Almost all houses in west Hawaii reported extensive internal damage but most avoided significant structural damage, the reason being that most of the buildings in the area around the epicenter of the earthquake have been built in the last few decades and are well constructed. Even so, over $200 million in damage occurred.

The largest and most luxurious hotels on the Island of Hawaii also happened to be clustered within ten miles (16 km) of the earthquake's epicenter along the Kohala coast. The 1965 Mauna Kea Beach Hotel had its entire south end collapse, and the hotel's top floor was considered "destroyed." The hotel closed on December 1 after a month-long inspection revealed that the building was unsafe and in danger of collapse. After a $150 million renovation, the hotel had a soft reopening on December 20, 2008, and officially reopened in March 2009. The Hapuna Beach Prince Hotel was temporarily evacuated after the earthquake due to structural damage, broken glass and flooding caused by broken water pipes. The Surety Kohala Corporation assessed the structural integrity to their Kohala Ditch, which functioned as a tourist attraction for 10 years.

Many roads and bridges collapsed or had deep cracks, and clean-up crews had to work for days to remove debris from the countless landslides. Many landmarks on the island were greatly affected. The Kalahikiola Congregational Church in Kohala was destroyed due to the collapse of the church's stone walls; the Hawi smoke stack, a relic of the old sugarcane trade, completely collapsed as well. The Hulihee Palace in Kailua Kona suffered extensive structural damage. Another popular tourist area, Kealakekua Bay, home of the white monument to Captain James Cook, was swept over by massive landslides that caused the entire bay and its surrounding areas to momentarily disappear in a thick cloud of brown dust.

=== Mauna Kea Observatory ===
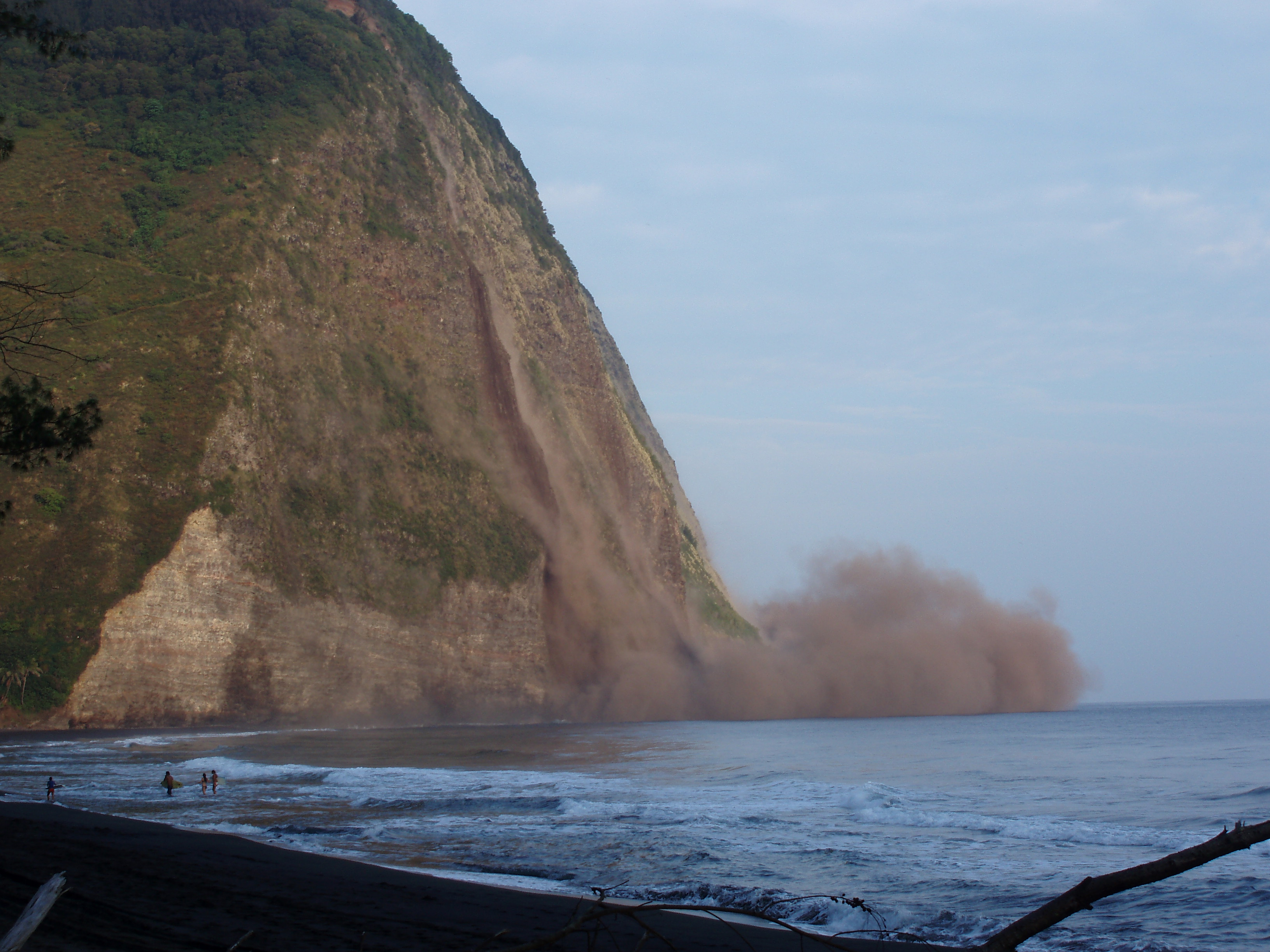
Cliff falling in Waipiʻo Valley during the earthquake.

During the earthquake and aftershocks, a number of the telescopes at the Mauna Kea Observatories sustained minor damage, primarily Kecks 1 and 2 at the W. M. Keck Observatory, and the Canada–France–Hawaii Telescope (CFHT). The CFHT was operational and back online as of October 19, but the Kecks were not restored to full operation until February 28, 2007.

=== Blackouts ===
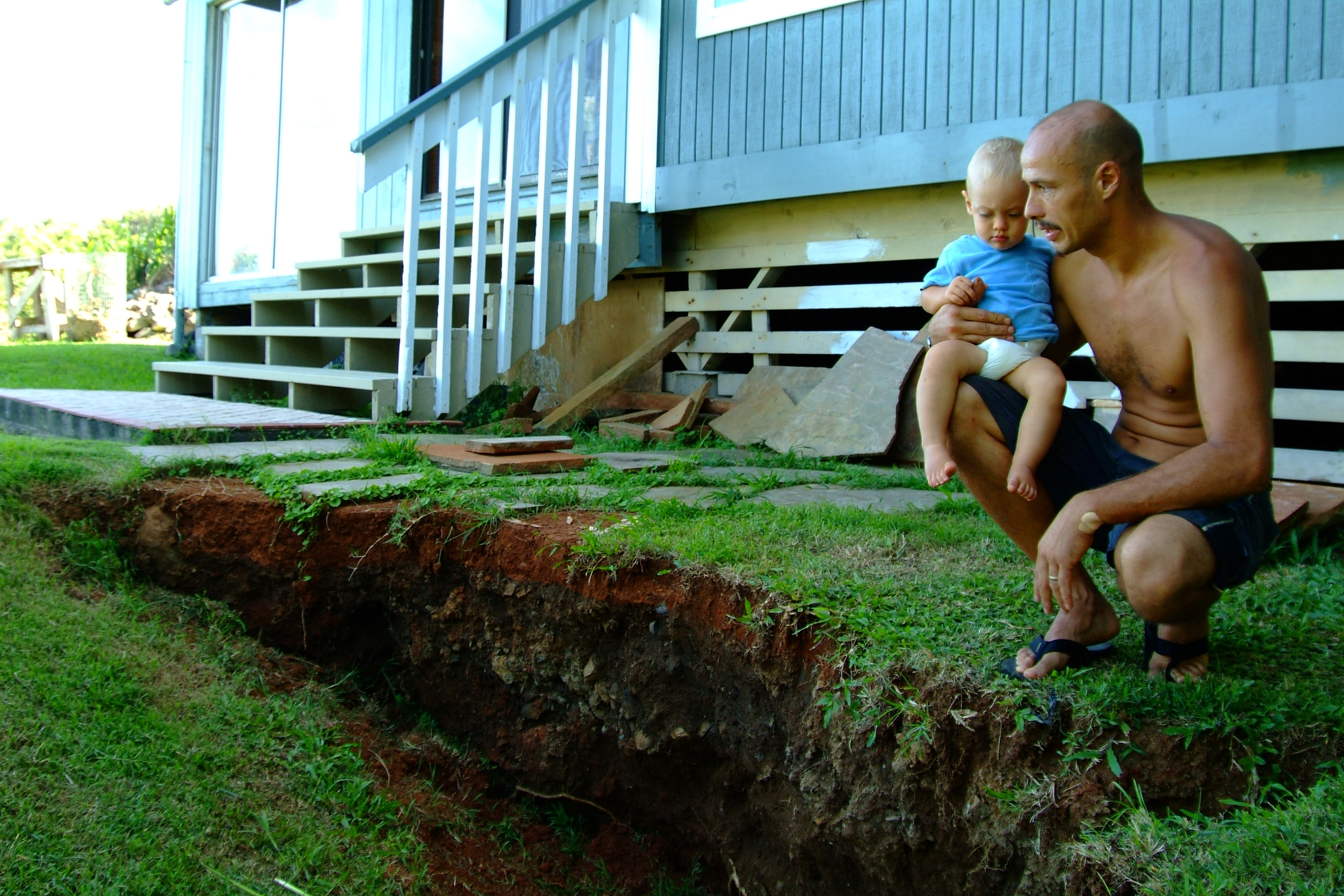
Earthquake rupture in the garden of a house in Kapaau.

Power plants on Maui and the Big Island automatically shut off power to prevent damage, and generators tripped on Oahu, causing overloads in the electrical grid. The Oahu power outages lasted 14 hours in some locations; only half of Hawaiian Electric Company's (HECO) Oahu customers had power restored before 9 pm, while outages generally lasted to about 5 pm on Maui and Hawaii. Power was restored to all HECO circuits by 1:55 am; however, there were isolated blackouts due to local problems, such as blown fuses. Power in Laie and Kahuku was not restored until 3 am. In Honolulu and Kahe, HECO generators shut down, and other generators tried to compensate, resulting in uneven loads on Oahu's electrical network and causing the system to shut down to prevent damage.

== Images ==
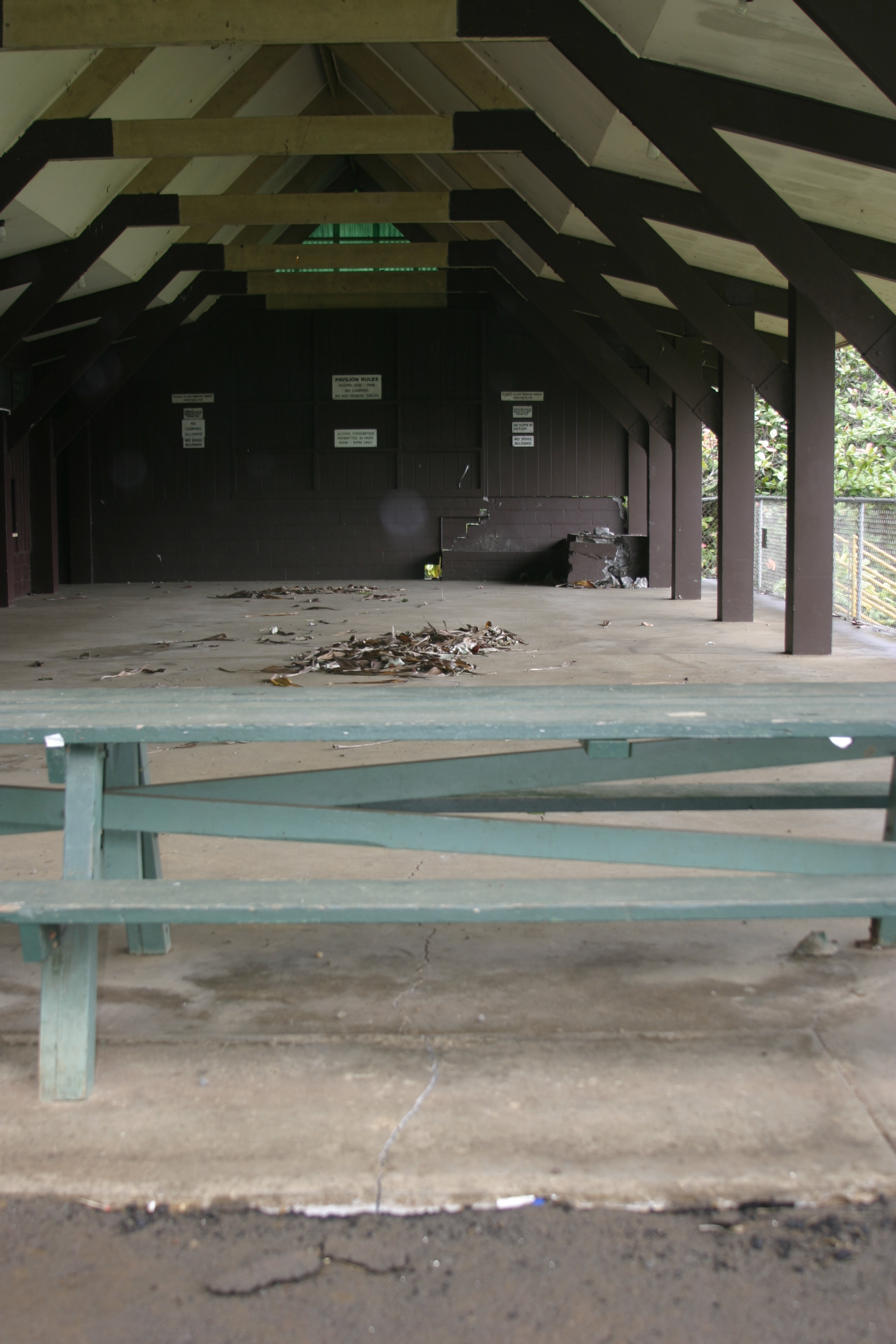
Earthquake damage in the Keokea Beach Park pavilion.

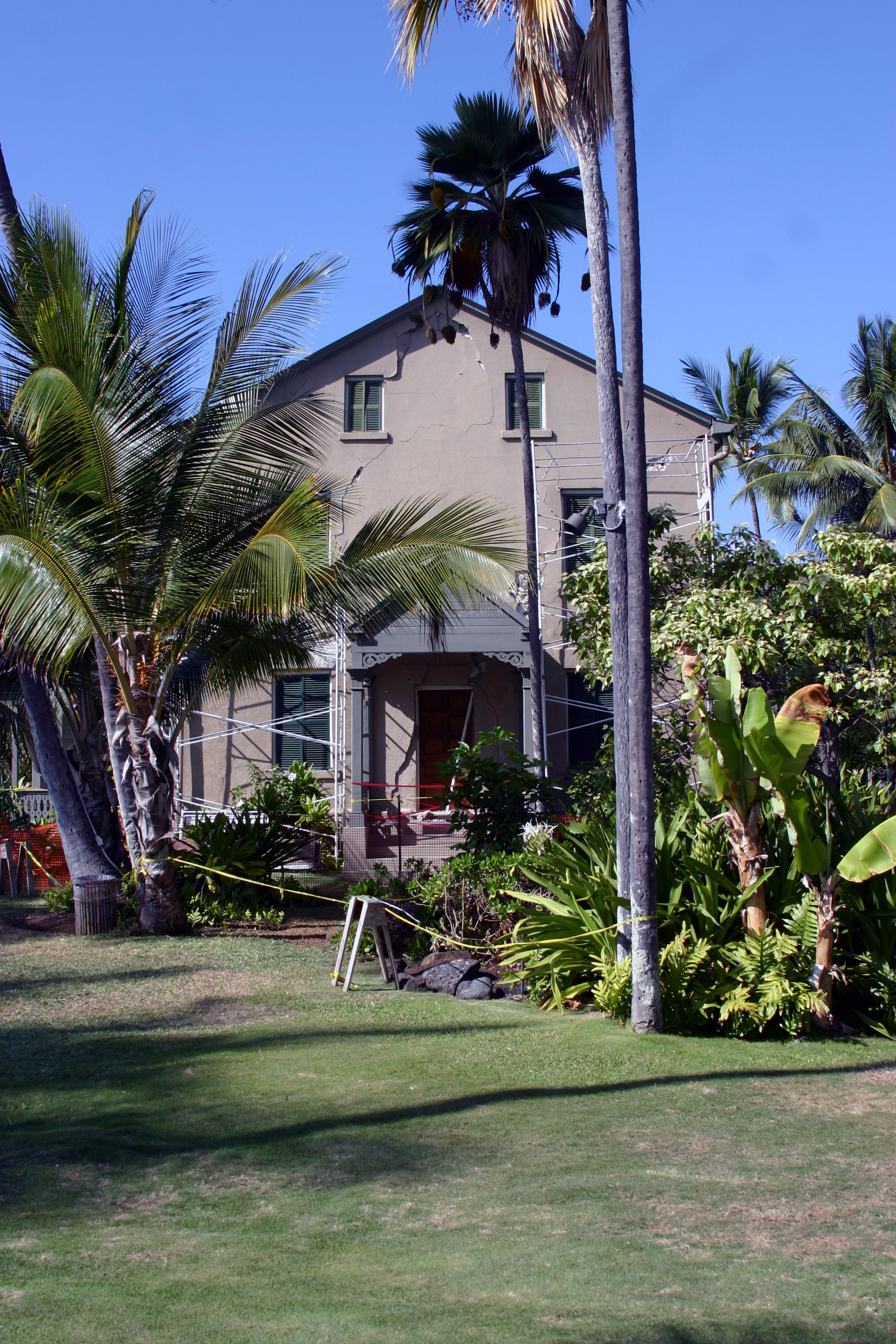
Earthquake damage at the Hulihee Palace in January 2007.

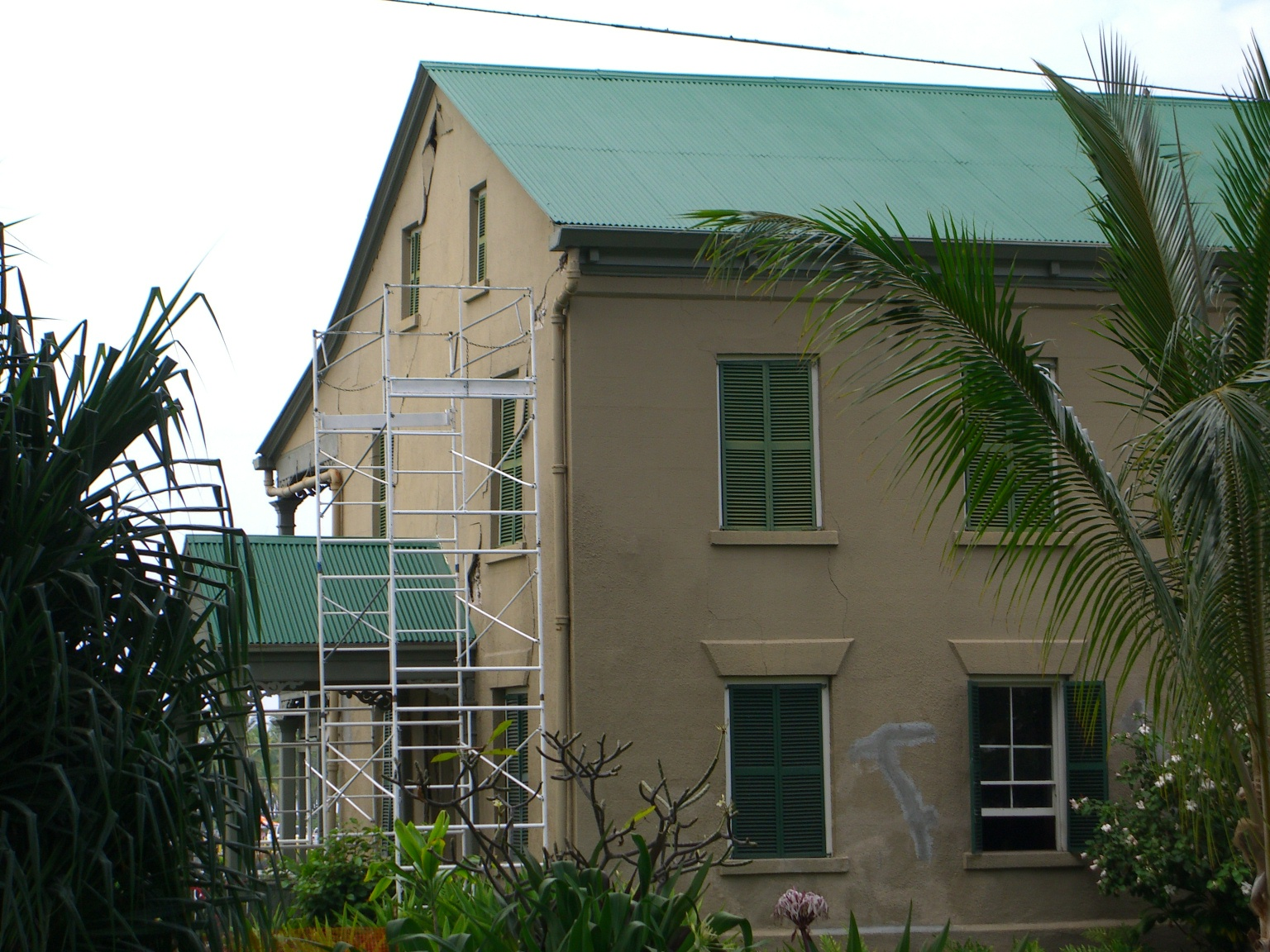
Earthquake damage at the Hulihee Palace in January 2007.

== See also ==
- Kiholo Bay
- List of earthquakes in 2006
- List of earthquakes in Hawaii
- List of earthquakes in the United States
- Lists of 21st-century earthquakes
