= Mokuʻaikaua Church =

Historic Place in Kailua-Kona, Hawaii County, Hawaii

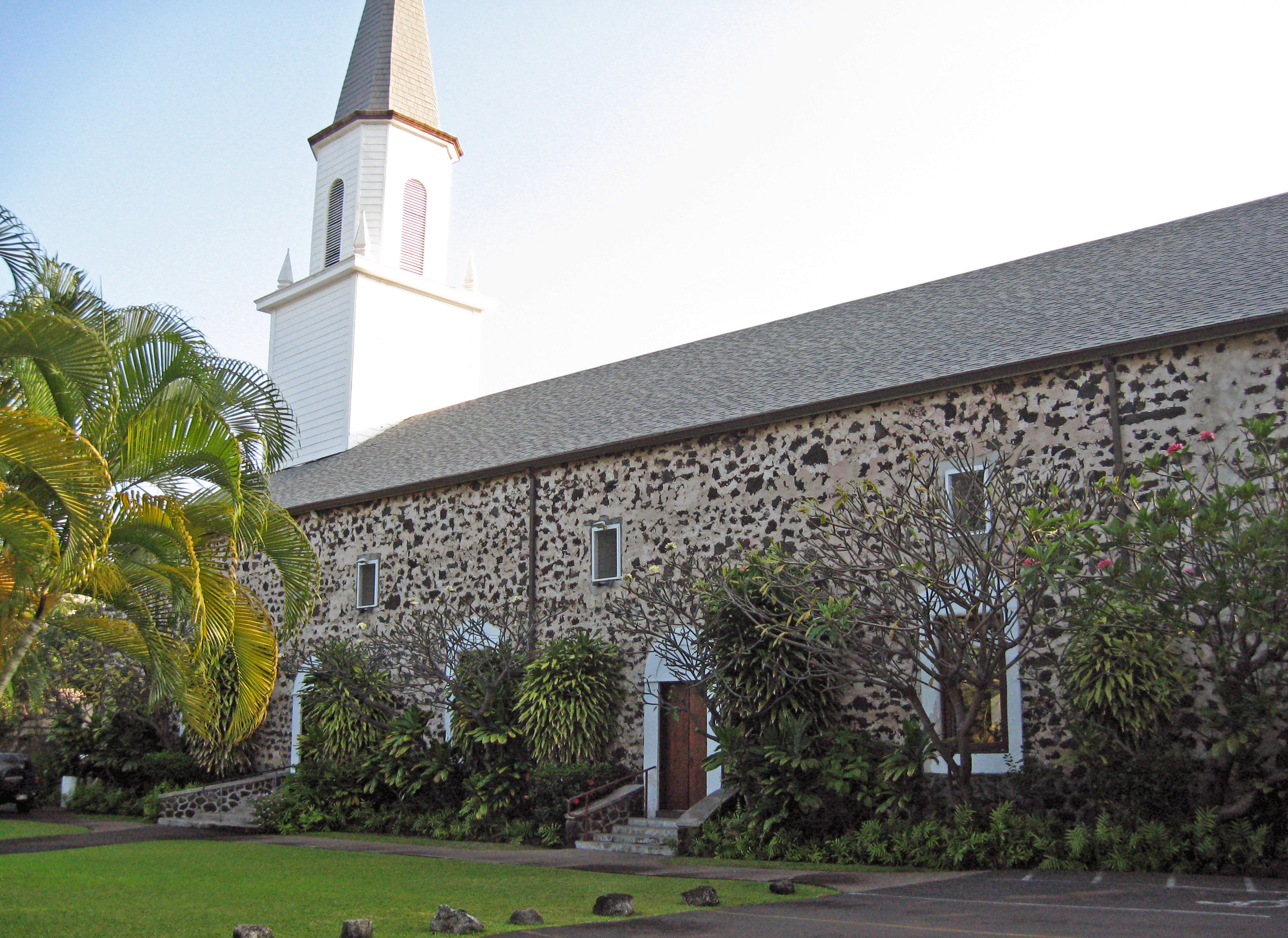
- Mokuʻaikaua Church
- Location: 75-5713 Alii Drive; Kailua-Kona, Hawaiʻi
- Country: United States
- Denomination: Congregationalist
- Website: www.mokuaikaua.org

History
- Status: Church
- Founded: 1820 (congregation)

Architecture
- Functional status: Active
- Years built: 1835–1837

Specifications
- Materials: Stone, limestone, ʻōhiʻa

Clergy
- Pastor: David de Carvalho
- Mokuaikaua Church
- U.S. National Register of Historic Places
- Location within Hawaii
- Coordinates: 19°38′22.56″N 155°59′37.92″W
- Area: 1 acre (0.40 ha)
- Built: 1837/1820
- NRHP reference No.: 78001015
- Added to NRHP: October 3, 1978

Mokuʻaikaua Church, located on the "Big Island" of Hawaii, is the oldest Christian church in the Hawaiian Islands. The congregation dates to 1820 and the building was completed in 1837.

== History ==
The congregation was first founded in 1820 by Asa and Lucy Goodale Thurston, from the first ship of American Christian Missionaries, the brig Thaddeus. They were given permission to teach Christianity by King Kamehameha II, and the Queen Regent Kaʻahumanu. After the royal court relocated to Honolulu, they briefly moved there. In October 1823, they learned that the people of Kailua-Kona had developed an interest in the new ways and had erected a small wooden church. The first structure on the site was made from Ohiʻa wood and a thatched roof, on land obtained from Royal Governor Kuakini across the street from his Huliheʻe Palace. The name moku ʻaikaua literally means "district acquired by war" in the Hawaiian language, probably after the upland forest area where the wood was obtained.

After several fires, the present stone structure was constructed, partially from stones recycled from a nearby Heiau (ancient temple of the Hawaiian religion), from about 1835 to 1837. The interior is decorated with Koa wood.

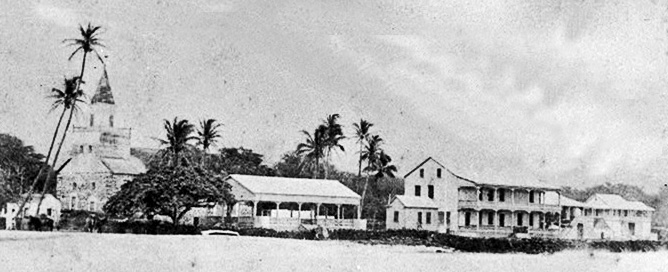
The steeple has long been a landmark, c. 1883

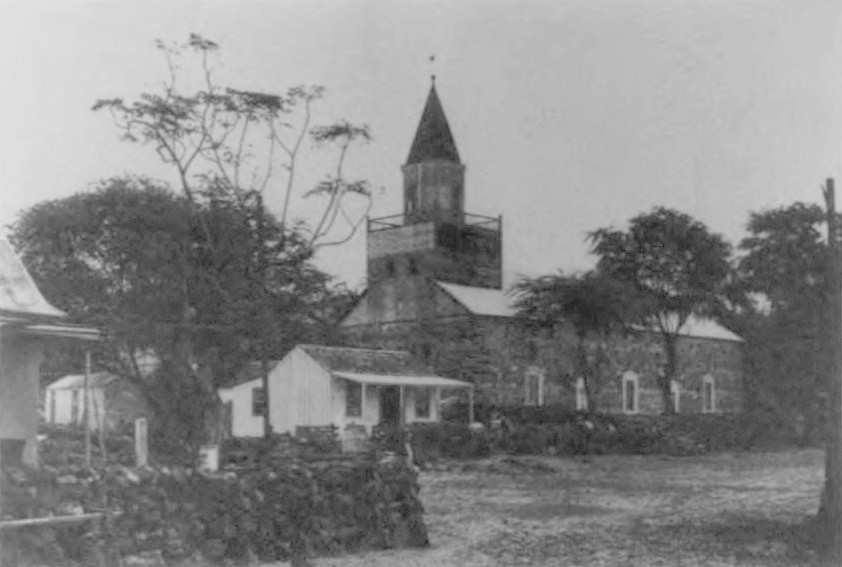
An upclose photograph of the Church in 1890, before the gate was built

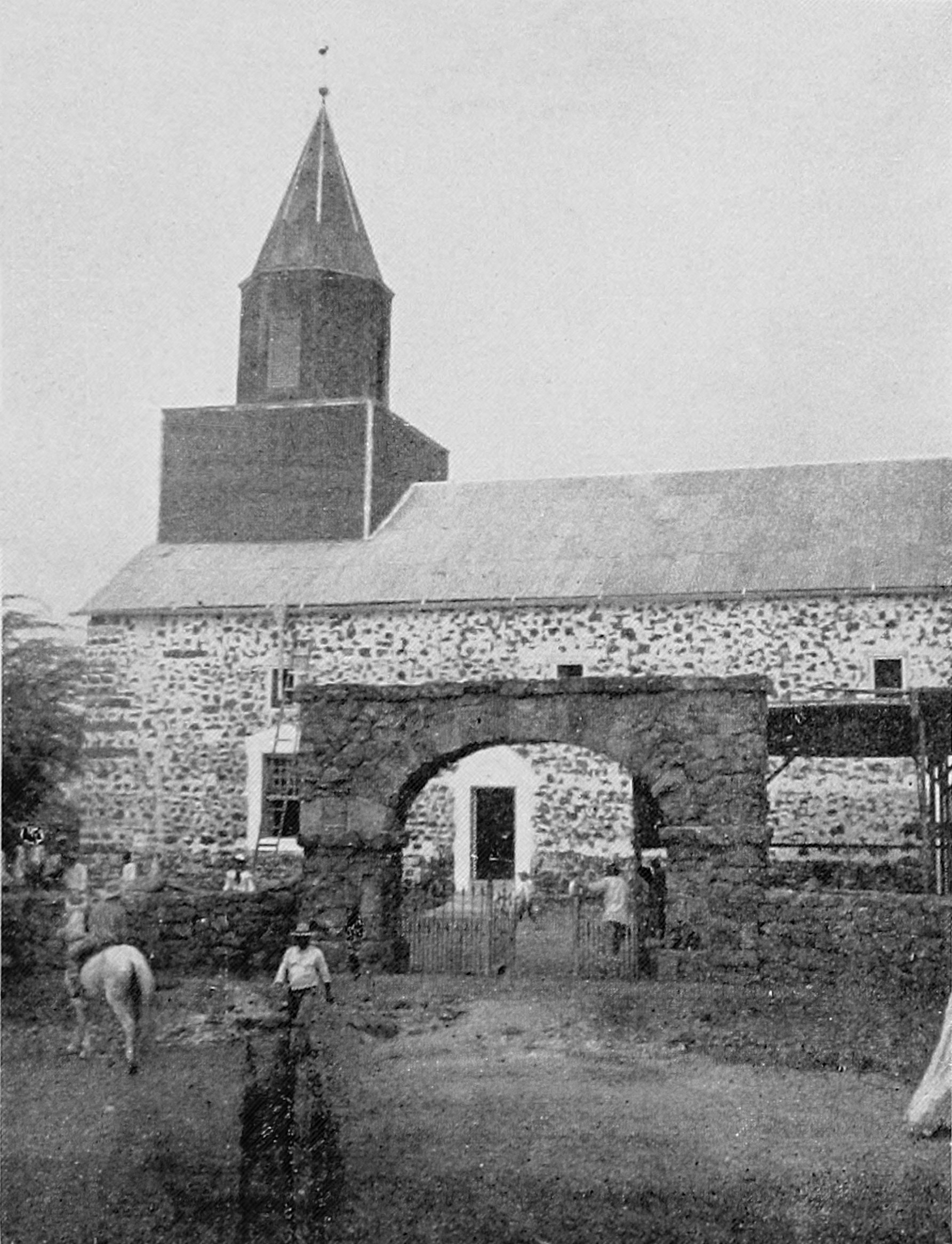
The gate of the church built about 1900

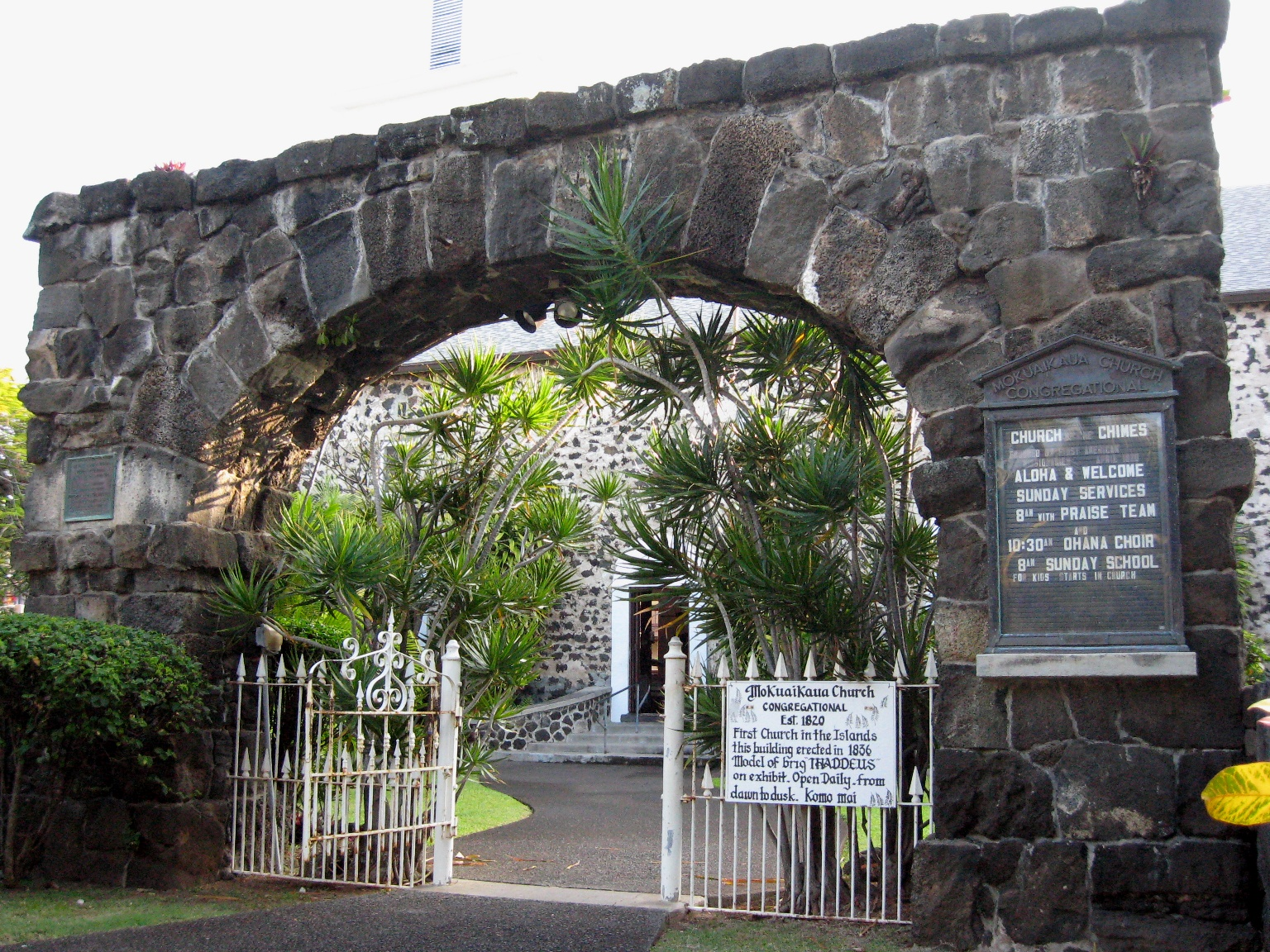
The gate of the church today

== Today ==
The church continues to be in use and is open to the public for tours, with some artifacts on display, such as a scale model of the Thaddeus. The other notable members of that first company were Rev. and Mrs. Hiram Bingham I. The state historic place register lists it as site 10-28-7231 as of January 1978. On October 3, 1978, it was added to the National Register of Historic Places listings on the island of Hawaii as site number 78001015.

== See also ==
- List of the oldest churches in the United States
