= Kamehameha I =

King of Hawaii from 1795 to 1819

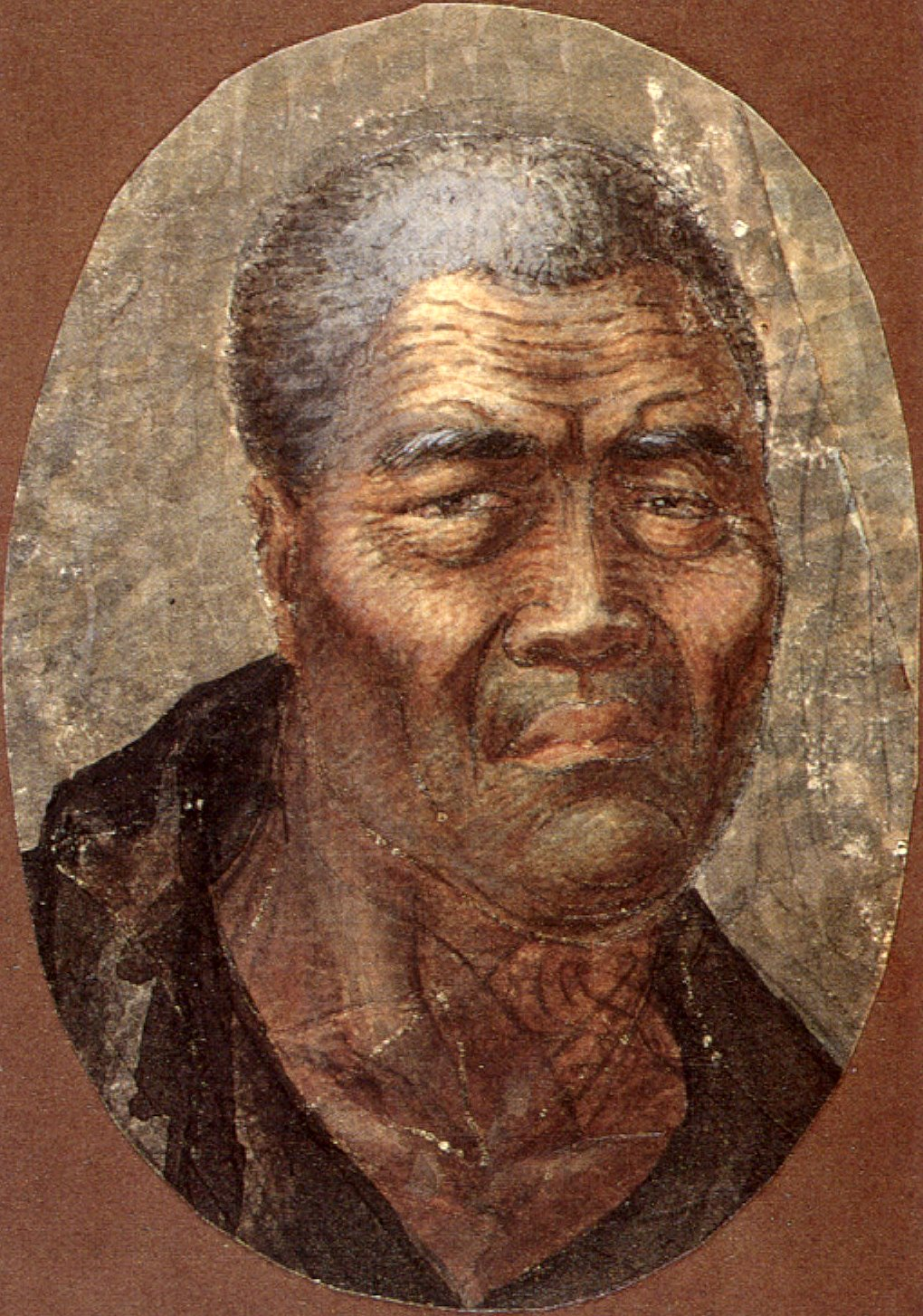
- Portrait of Kamehameha (c. 1758–1819), King of the Sandwich Islands by Louis Choris, 1816.

King of the Hawaiian Islands
- Reign: 1795 – May 8, 1819
- Successor: Kamehameha II

Aliʻi nui of Hawaii
- Reign: July 1782 – 1795
- Predecessor: Kīwalaʻō
- Born: Paiʻea between 1736–1761; Kapakai, Kokoiki, Moʻokini Heiau, Kohala, Hawaiʻi Island
- Died: May 8 or 14, 1819 (aged 57–83); Kamakahonu, Kailua-Kona, Kona, Kingdom of Hawaii
- Spouses: (Partial list): Kaʻahumanu; Keōpūolani; Kalola-a-Kumukoa; Peleuli; Kaupekamoku; Kalākua Kaheiheimālie; Nāmāhāna Piʻia; Kahakuhaʻakoi Wahinepio; Kekāuluohi; Haʻaloʻu; Kekikipaʻa; Kaʻākaupālahalaha; Manono II; Maunakalika; Kānekapōlei; ʻEwaloa
- Issue: (Partial list): Liholiho (Kamehameha II); Kauikeaouli (Kamehameha III); Nāhiʻenaʻena; Keawelaiki; Kamāmalu; Kīnaʻu (Kaʻahumanu II); Kahōʻanokū Kīnaʻu; Kānekapōlei II; Kahaʻaulani
Names
- Kalani Paiʻea Wohi o Kaleikini Kealiʻikui Kamehameha o ʻIolani i Kaiwikapu kauʻi Ka Liholiho Kūnuiākea
- House: Kamehameha
- Father: Keōua Kalanikupuapaʻīkalaninui Ahilapalapa
- Mother: Kekuʻiapoiwa II

Kamehameha I (Hawaiian pronunciation: [kəmehəˈmɛhə]; Kalani Paiʻea Wohi o Kaleikini Kealiʻikui Kamehameha o ʻIolani i Kaiwikapu kauʻi Ka Liholiho Kūnuiākea; c. 1736 – c. 1761 to May 8 or 14, 1819), also known as Kamehameha the Great, was the conqueror and first ruler of the Kingdom of Hawaii.

== Birth and childhood ==
=== Paternity and family history ===
Kamehameha (known as Paiʻea at birth), was born to Kekuʻiapoiwa II, the niece of Alapainui, the usurping ruler of Hawaii Island who had killed the two legitimate heirs of Keaweʻīkekahialiʻiokamoku during civil war. By most accounts, he was born in Ainakea, Kohala, Hawaii. His father was Keōua Kalanikupuapa'ikalaninui; however, Native Hawaiian historian Samuel Kamakau says that Maui monarch Kahekili II had hānai adopted (traditional, informal adoption) Kamehameha at birth, as was the custom of the time. Kamakau believes this is why Kahekili II is often referred to as Kamehameha's father. The author also says that Kameʻeiamoku told Kamehameha I that he was the son of Kahekili II, saying, "I have something to tell you: Ka-hekili was your father, you were not Keoua's son. Here are the tokens that you are the son of Ka-hekili."

King Kalākaua wrote that these rumors were scandals and should be dismissed as the offspring of hatred and jealousies of later years. Regardless of the rumors, Kamehameha was a descendant of Keawe through his mother Kekuʻiapoiwa II; Keōua acknowledged him as his son and he is recognized as such by all the sovereigns and most genealogists.

Accounts of Kamehameha I's birth vary, but sources place his birth between 1736 and 1761, with historian Ralph Simpson Kuykendall believing it to be between 1748 and 1761. An early source is thought to imply a 1758 dating because that date matched a visit from Halley's Comet, and would make him close to the age that Francisco de Paula Marín estimated he was. This dating, however, does not accord with the details of many well-known accounts of his life, such as his fighting as a warrior with his uncle, Kalaniʻōpuʻu, or his being of age to father his first children by that time. The 1758 dating also places his birth after the death of his father.

Kamakau published an account in the Ka Nupepa Kuokoa in 1867 placing the date of Kamehameha's birth around 1736. He wrote, "It was during the time of the warfare among the chiefs of [the island of] Hawaii which followed the death of Keawe, chief over the whole island (Ke-awe-i-kekahi-aliʻi-o-ka-moku) that Kamehameha I was born". However, his general dating has been challenged as twenty years too early, related to disputes over Kamakau's inaccuracy of dating compared to accounts of foreign visitors. Regardless, Abraham Fornander wrote in his book, An Account of the Polynesian Race: Its Origins and Migrations: "when Kamehameha died in 1819 he was past eighty years old. His birth would thus fall between 1736 and 1740, probably nearer the former than the latter". A Brief History of the Hawaiian People by William De Witt Alexander lists the birth date in the "Chronological Table of Events of Hawaiian History" as 1736. In 1888 the Kamakau account was challenged by Samuel C. Damon in the missionary publication; The Friend, deferring to a 1753 dating that was the first mentioned by James Jackson Jarves. But the Kamakau dating was widely accepted due to support from Abraham Fornander.

=== Concealment and childhood ===
At the time of Kamehameha's birth, his father, Keōua, along with his half-brother, Kalaniʻōpuʻu, were serving Alapaʻinui, ruler of the island of Hawaiʻi; Alapaʻinui had brought the brothers to his court, after defeating both of their fathers in the civil war that followed the death of Keaweʻīkekahialiʻiokamoku. Keōua had died while Kamehameha was very young, thus the boy was raised in the court of his uncle, Kalaniʻōpuʻu. The traditional mele chant of Keakamahana (chiefess and wife of Alapainui) mentions that Kamehameha was born in the month of ikuwā (autumn/winter), or around November; Alapai gave the young Kamehameha to Keaka and her sister, Hākau, to raise, once the ruler discovered the infant had indeed survived.

On February 10, 1911, the Kamakau version was challenged by the oral history of the Kaha family, as published in newspaper articles also appearing in the Kuoko. After Kamakau's history was published again (this time to a wider, English-reading public in 1911 Hawaii), the Kaha version of these events was published by Kamaka Stillman, who had objected to the Nupepa article.

== Conquest of the islands ==
Evolution of kingdom borders in Hawaii during Kamehameha's conquests

=== Hawaii Island ===
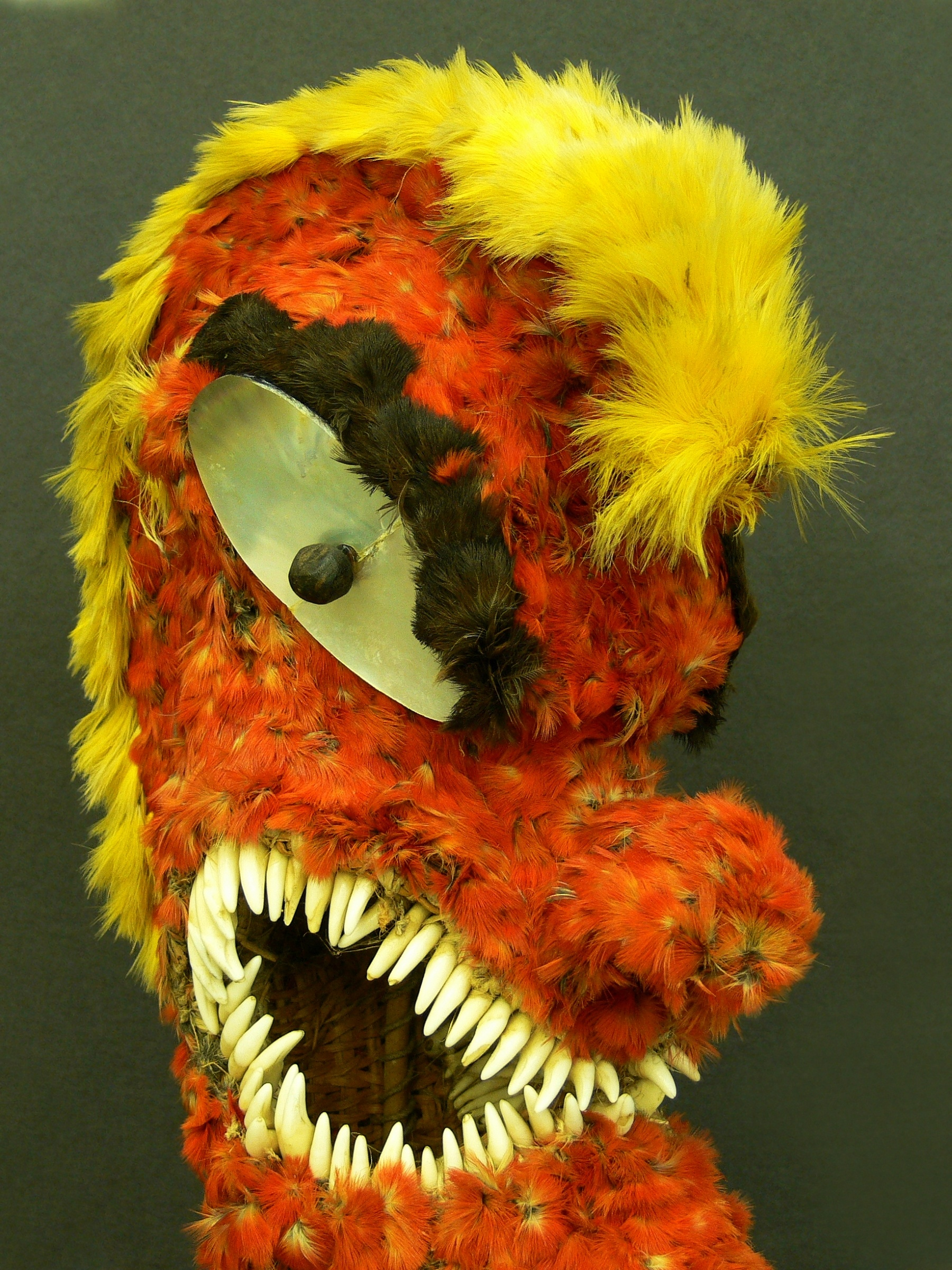
This feather sculpture of the god Kūkaʻilimoku was left to Kamehameha I by his uncle Kalaniʻōpuʻu

Kamehameha was raised in the royal court of his uncle Kalaniʻōpuʻu. He achieved prominence in 1782, upon Kalaniʻōpuʻu's death. While the kingship was inherited by Kīwalaʻō, Kalaniʻōpuʻu's son, Kamehameha was given a prominent religious position as guardian of the Hawaiian god of war, Kūkaʻilimoku. He was also given control of the district of Waipiʻo Valley. The two cousins' relationship was strained after Kamehameha made a dedication to the gods instead of allowing Kīwalaʻō to do that. Kamehameha accepted the allegiance of a group of chiefs from the Kona district.

The other story took place after the prophecy was passed along by the high priests and high chiefs. When Kamehameha was able to lift the Naha Stone, he was considered the fulfiller of the prophecy. Other ruling chiefs, Keawe Mauhili, the Mahoe (twins) Keoua, and other chiefs rejected the prophecy of Ka Poukahi. The high chiefs of Kauai supported Kiwalaʻo even after learning about the prophecy.

The five Kona chiefs supporting Kamehameha were Keʻeaumoku Pāpaʻiahiahi (Kamehameha's father-in-law/grand uncle), Keaweaheulu Kaluaʻāpana (Kamehameha's uncle), Kekūhaupiʻo (Kamehameha's warrior teacher), and Kameʻeiamoku and Kamanawa (twin uncles of Kamehameha). They defended Kamehameha as the unifier Ka Naʻi aupuni. High Chiefs Keawe Mauhili and Keeaumoku were by genealogy the next in line for aliʻi nui. Both chose the younger nephews Kīwalaʻō and Kamehameha over themselves. Kīwalaʻō was soon defeated in the first key conflict, the Battle of Mokuʻōhai. Kamehameha and his chiefs took over Konohiki responsibilities and sacred obligations of the districts of Kohala, Kona, and Hāmākua on Hawaiʻi.

The prophecy included far more than the island of Hawaiʻi. It went across and beyond the Pacific Islands to the semi-continent of Aotearoa (New Zealand). He was supported by his most political wife Kaʻahumanu and father, High Chief Keeaumoku. Senior counselor to Kamehameha, she became one of Hawaiʻi's most powerful figures. Kamehameha and his council of chiefs planned to unite the rest of the Hawaiian Islands. Allies came from British and American traders, who sold guns and ammunition to Kamehameha. Another major factor in Kamehameha's continued success was the support of Kauai chief Kaʻiana and Captain William Brown of the Butterworth Squadron. He guaranteed Kamehameha unlimited gunpowder from Qing China and gave him the formula for gunpowder: sulfur, saltpeter, and charcoal, all of which are abundant in the islands. Two westerners who lived on Hawaiʻi island, Isaac Davis and John Young, married native Hawaiian women and assisted Kamehameha.

=== Olowalu Massacre ===
In 1789, Simon Metcalfe had been captaining a fur-trading vessel, the Eleanora, while his son, Thomas Humphrey Metcalfe, captained the ship Fair American along the Pacific Northwest Coast; the two parties were to rendezvous in the Hawaiian Islands. Fair American was held up when it was captured by the Spanish at Nootka Sound and taken to San Blas, Nayarit, where it was soon released.

The Eleanora finally arrived in 1790, where it was greeted by Chief Kameʻeiamoku. During their interactions, the chief allegedly offended or insulted Captain Metcalfe, who then struck the chief with the end of a rope. Sometime later, while docked in Honolua, Maui, a small boat—which was tied to the larger ship, and had a crewman inside—was stolen by native islanders. When Metcalfe discovered where the boat was taken, he sailed directly to the village of Olowalu. There, he confirmed that the boat had been broken apart and the shipmate murdered. Previously, Metcalfe had resorted to violence when he fired muskets into another village near where he had been anchored, ultimately killing some of the residents. This time, furious, Metcalfe took aim at Olowalu, ordering all cannons aboard the ship to be moved to one side, facing the island. As the captain initiated his trading calls and greetings to the locals, hundreds of people—men, women, children and elderly—ventured down to the beach to trade, on foot and by canoe. When the islanders were within range, Metcalfe ordered broadsides to be fired on the Hawaiians, killing over 100 of them.

Six weeks later, Fair American was stuck near the Kona coast of Hawaii, where Chief Kameʻeiamoku was living, near Kaʻūpūlehu. Kameʻeiamoku had decided to attack the next foreign ship to avenge the strike by the elder Metcalfe. He canoed out to the ship with his men, where he killed Metcalfe's son and all but one (Isaac Davis) of the five crewmen. Kamehameha took Davis into protection and took possession of the ship. Eleanora was at that time anchored at Kealakekua Bay, where the ship's boatswain had gone ashore and been captured by Kamehameha's forces because Kamehameha believed Metcalfe was planning more revenge. Eleanora waited several days before sailing off, apparently without knowledge of what had happened to Fair American or Metcalfe's son. Davis and Eleanora's boatswain, John Young, tried to escape, but were treated as chiefs, given wives and settled in Hawaii.

=== Invasion of Maui ===
In 1790, while the aliʻi Kahekili II was on Oʻahu, Kamehameha's army invaded Maui with the assistance of John Young and Isaac Davis. Using cannons from the Fair American, they defeated Maui's army led by Kahekili's son Kalanikūpule at the bloody Battle of Kepaniwai.

In 1791, Kahekili, supported by his brother Kāʻeokūlani, aliʻi of Kauaʻi, reconquered Maui and also acquired cannons. In April or May 1791, Kahekili tried to invade the island of Hawaiʻi, but was defeated in a naval battle called Kepuwahaʻulaʻula near Waipiʻo.

=== Death of Keōua Kuahuula ===
In 1790, Keōua Kūʻahuʻula, who came to rule the districts of Kaʻū and Puna, took advantage of Kamehameha's absence in Maui and began raiding the west coast of Hawaii. He also advanced against the district of Hilo, deposing his uncle Keawemaʻuhili. When Kamehameha returned, Keōua escaped to the Kīlauea volcano, which erupted. Many warriors died from the poisonous gas emitted from the volcano.

When the Puʻukoholā Heiau was completed in 1791, Kamehameha invited Keōua to meet with him. Keōua may have been dispirited by his recent losses. He may have mutilated himself before landing so as to render himself an inappropriate sacrificial victim. As he stepped on shore, one of Kamehameha's chiefs threw a spear at him. By some accounts, he dodged it but was then cut down by musket fire. Caught by surprise, Keōua's bodyguards were killed. With Keōua dead, and his supporters captured or slain, Kamehameha became King of Hawaiʻi island.

=== Maui and Oʻahu ===
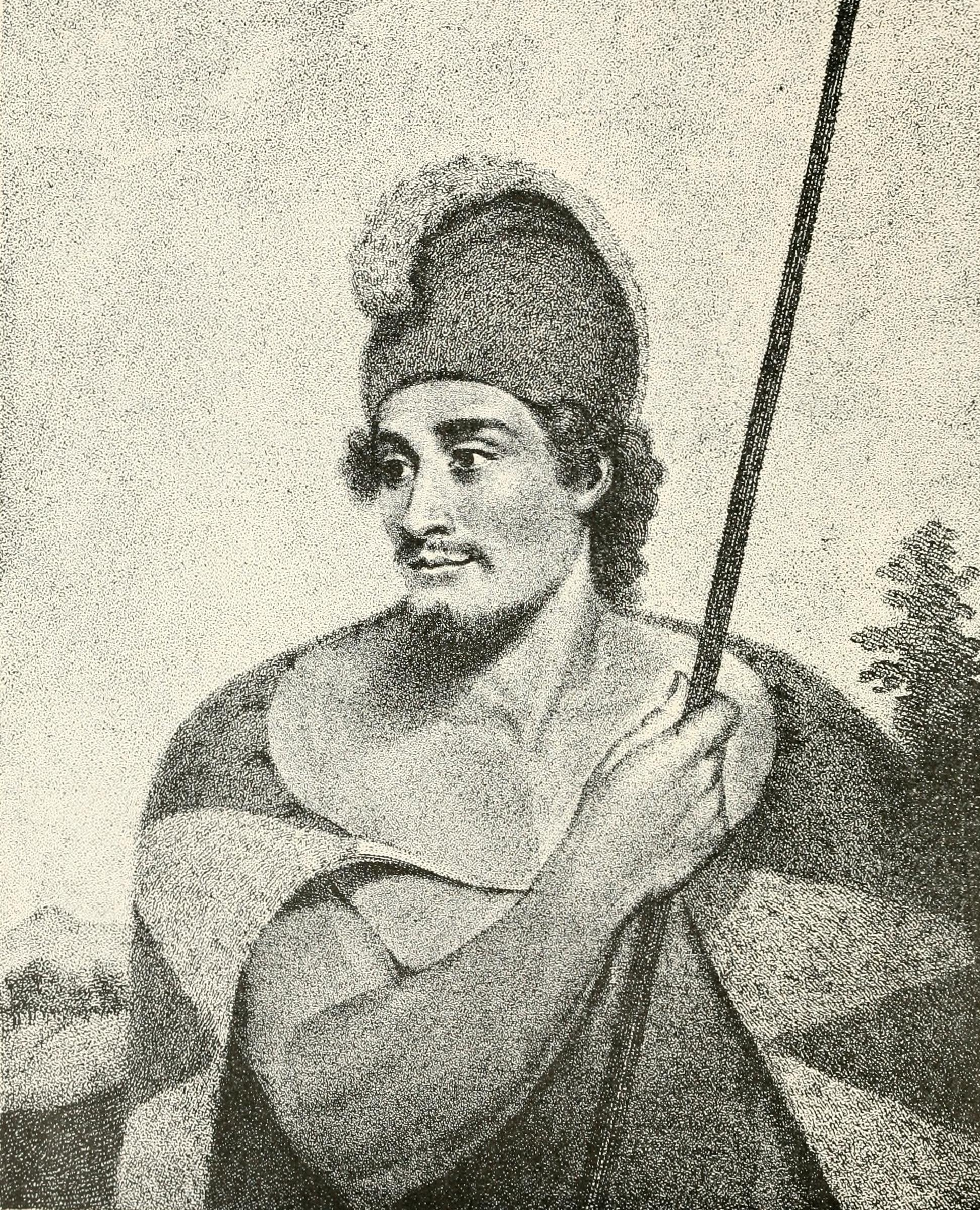
Kaʻiana

In 1794, the aged Kahekili II died. He left the governance of Oʻahu to his son Kalanikūpule and of Maui and Molokaʻi to Kāʻeokūlani. A civil war between the two broke out, which ended when Kalanikūpule killed Kāʻeokūlani, taking control of Maui and Molokaʻi. This initiated a succession crisis on Kauaʻi, which had previously been ruled by Kāʻeokūlani.

Seeing an opportunity, in 1795, Kamehameha set sail with an armada of 960 war canoes and 10,000 soldiers. He quickly secured the lightly defended islands of Maui and Molokaʻi at the Battle of Kawela. He moved on to the island of Oʻahu, landing his troops at Waiʻalae and Waikīkī. Kamehameha did not know that one of his commanders, a high-ranking aliʻi named Kaʻiana, had defected to Kalanikūpule. Kaʻiana assisted in cutting notches into the Nuʻuanu Pali mountain ridge; these notches, like those on a castle turret, were to serve as gunports for Kalanikūpule's cannon. In a series of skirmishes, Kamehameha's forces pushed Kalanikūpule's men back until they were cornered on the Pali Lookout. While Kamehameha moved on the Pali, his troops took heavy fire from the cannon. He assigned two divisions of his best warriors to climb to the Pali to attack the cannons from behind; they surprised Kalanikūpule's gunners and took control. With the loss of their guns, Kalanikūpule's troops fell into disarray and were cornered by Kamehameha's still-organized troops. A fierce battle at Nuʻuanu ensued, with Kamehameha's forces forming an enclosing wall. Using traditional Hawaiian spears, as well as muskets and cannon, they killed most of Kalanikūpule's forces. Over 700 men were forced over the Pali's cliff, a drop of 1,000 feet. Kaʻiana was killed during the action; Kalanikūpule was later captured and sacrificed to Kūkāʻilimoku.

=== Kauaʻi and rebellion of Nāmakehā ===
After his conquest of Oahu in the summer of 1795, Kamehameha I prepared his forces for the conquest of Kauaʻi, the last remaining island kingdom out of his control. In the spring of 1796, he attempted to continue with his forces to Kauaʻi but he lost many of his canoes in the strong winds and rough seas of the Kaʻieʻie Waho channel. He returned to Hawaii to pacify the rebellion of Nāmakehā (brother of Kaʻiana) in Hilo and ruled from Hawaii for the next six years as he consolidated his conquests and prepared for a second invasion of Kauaʻi. At Hilo, Kamehameha I commissioned the building of a large fleet of 800 (according to Kamakau) double-hulled war canoes called peleleu along with Western schooners, and he also stockpiled large number of guns, canons and ammunition. He took his peleleu to Maui where he stayed from 1802 to 1803 and then to Oʻahu in late 1803 or early 1804. While in Oʻahu, a large percentage of his force was killed by the maʻi ʻokuʻu epidemic, which was thought to be either cholera or bubonic plague. Kamehameha I contracted the illness but survived. The second invasion of Kauaʻi was postponed.

By now, the succession crisis on Kauaʻi had resolved, with Kāʻeokūlani's son, Kaumualiʻi, emerging as the new king. In April 1810, Kamehameha I negotiated the peaceful unification of the islands with Kaumualiʻi. His court genealogist and high priest Kalaikuʻahulu was instrumental in the monarch's decision to leave Kaumualiʻi as a tributary king rather than killing him, when he was the single member of the aliʻi council to agree with Kamehameha's own reluctance to do so. The other aliʻi continued with the plan to poison Kaumualiʻi when Isaac Davis warned him, making the ruler cut his trip short and return to Kauaʻi, leaving Davis to be poisoned by the aliʻi instead.

== Aliʻi Moʻi of the Hawaiian Islands ==
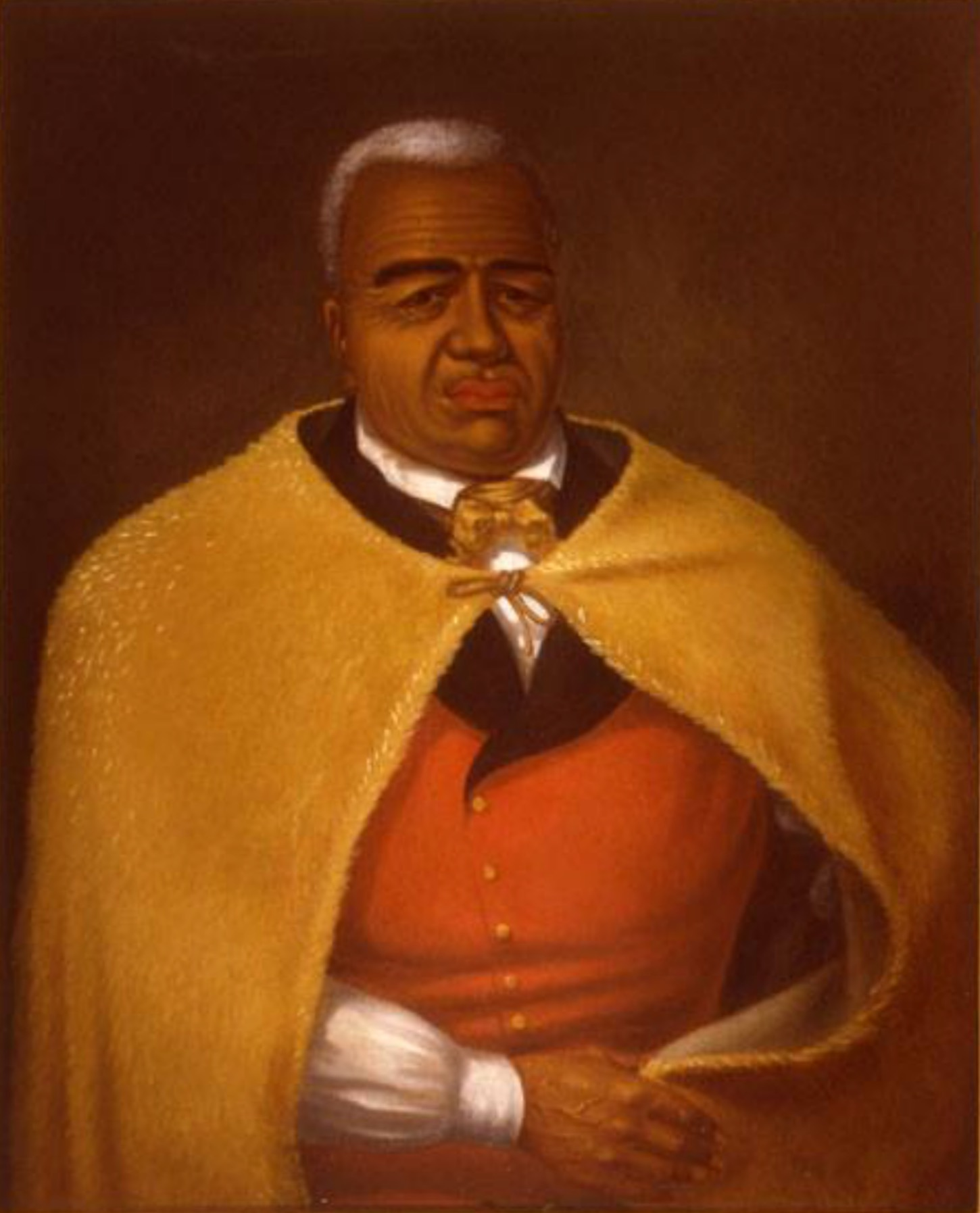
Kamehameha I, portrait by James Gay Sawkins, based on Louis Choris sketch

As ruler, Kamehameha took steps to ensure the islands remained a united realm after his death. He unified the legal system. He used the products collected in taxes to promote trade with Europe and the United States.

The origins of the Law of the Splintered Paddle are derived from before the unification of the Island of Hawaiʻi. In 1782 during a raid, Kamehameha caught his foot in a rock. Two local fishermen, fearful of the great warrior, hit Kamehameha hard on the head with a large paddle, which broke the paddle. Kamehameha was stunned and left for dead, allowing the fisherman and his companion to escape. Twelve years later, the same fishermen were brought before Kamehameha for punishment. The king instead blamed himself for attacking innocent people, gave the fishermen gifts of land and set them free. He declared the new law, "Let every elderly person, woman, and child lie by the roadside in safety".

Young and Davis became advisors to Kamehameha and provided him with advanced weapons that helped in combat. Kamehameha was also a religious king and the holder of the war god Kūkāʻilimoku. The explorer George Vancouver noted that Kamehameha worshiped his gods and wooden images in a heiau, but originally wanted to bring England's religion, Christianity, to Hawaiʻi. Missionaries were not sent from Great Britain because Kamehameha told Vancouver that the gods he worshiped were his gods with mana, and that through these gods, Kamehameha had become supreme ruler over all of the islands. Witnessing Kamehameha's devotion, Vancouver decided against sending missionaries from England. Kamehameha I believed that Christianity may bring mana or heavenly power to revitalise the Hawaiian community. The first American Board of Commissioners for Foreign Missions company arrived in Hawaii on March 30, 1820, on the Thaddeus from Boston.

== Later life ==
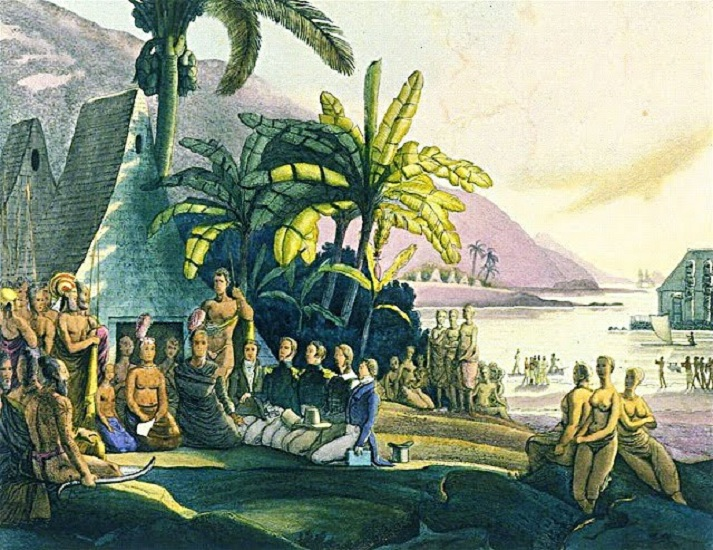
King Kamehameha receiving the Russian naval expedition of Otto von Kotzebue. Drawing by Louis Choris in 1816.

After about 1812, Kamehameha returned from Oahu and spent the last years of his life at Kamakahonu, a compound he built in Kailua-Kona. As was the custom of the time, he had several wives and many children, though he outlived many of them.

=== Final resting place ===
When Kamehameha died on May 8 or 14, 1819, his body was hidden by his trusted friends, Hoapili and Hoʻolulu, in the ancient custom called hūnākele (literally, "to hide in secret"). The mana, or power of a person, was considered to be sacred. As per the ancient custom, his body was buried in a hidden location because of his mana. His final resting place remains unknown. At one point in his reign, Kamehameha III asked that Hoapili show him where his father's bones were buried, but on the way there Hoapili knew that they were being followed, so he turned around.

== Family ==
Kamehameha had many wives. The exact number is debated because documents that recorded the names of his wives were destroyed. Hiram Bingham I lists 21 wives, but earlier research from Mary Kawena Pukui counted 26. In Kamehameha's Children Today authors Charles Ahlo, Rubellite Kawena Johnson and Jerry Walker list 30 wives: 18 who had children, and 12 who did not. They state the total number of children to be 35: 17 sons and 18 daughters. While he had many wives and children, only his children through his highest-ranking wife, Keōpūolani, succeeded him to the throne. In Hoʻomana: Understanding the Sacred and Spiritual, Chun stated that Keōpūolani supported Kaʻahumanu's ending of the Kapu system as the best way to ensure that Kamehameha's children and grandchildren would rule the kingdom.

Kalaniʻōpuʻu, Kamehameha, Kānekapōlei and Peleuli family tree

Family tree based on Abraham Fornander's "An Account of the Polynesian Race" and other works from the author, Queen Liliuokalani's "Hawaii's Story by Hawaii's Queen", Samuel Mānaiakalani Kamakau's "Ruling Chiefs of Hawaii" and other works by the author, John Papa ʻĪʻī's "Fragments of Hawaiian History", Edith Kawelohea McKinzie's "Hawaiian Genealogies: Extracted from Hawaiian Language Newspapers, Vol. I & II", Kanalu G. Terry Young's "Rethinking the Native Hawaiian Past", Charles Ahlo, Jerry Walker, and Rubellite Kawena Johnson's "Kamehameha's Children Today", The Hawaiian Historical Society Reports, the genealogies of the Hawaiian Royal families in Kingdom of Hawaii probate, the works of Sheldon Dibble and David Malo as well as the Hawaii State Archive genealogy books.

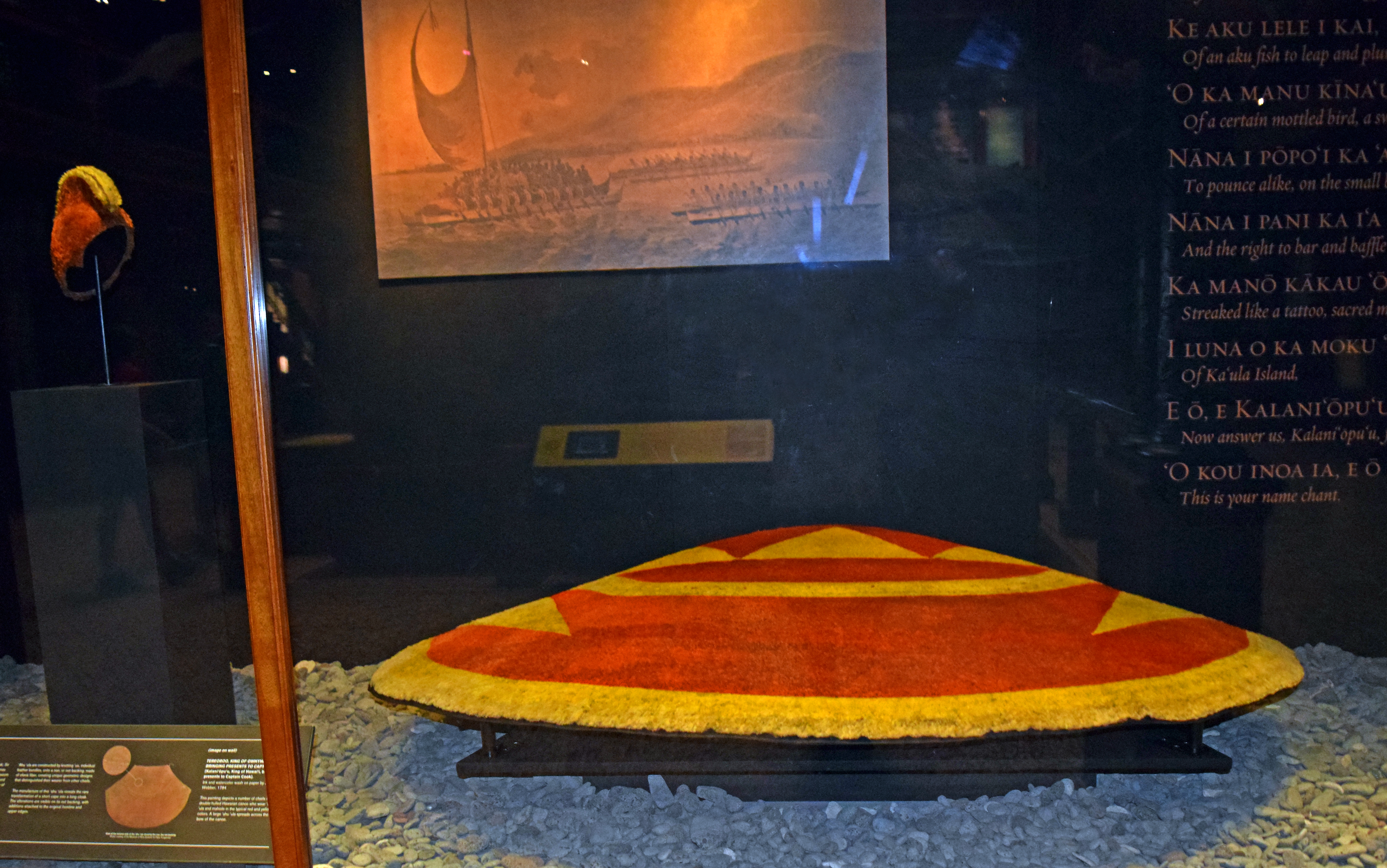
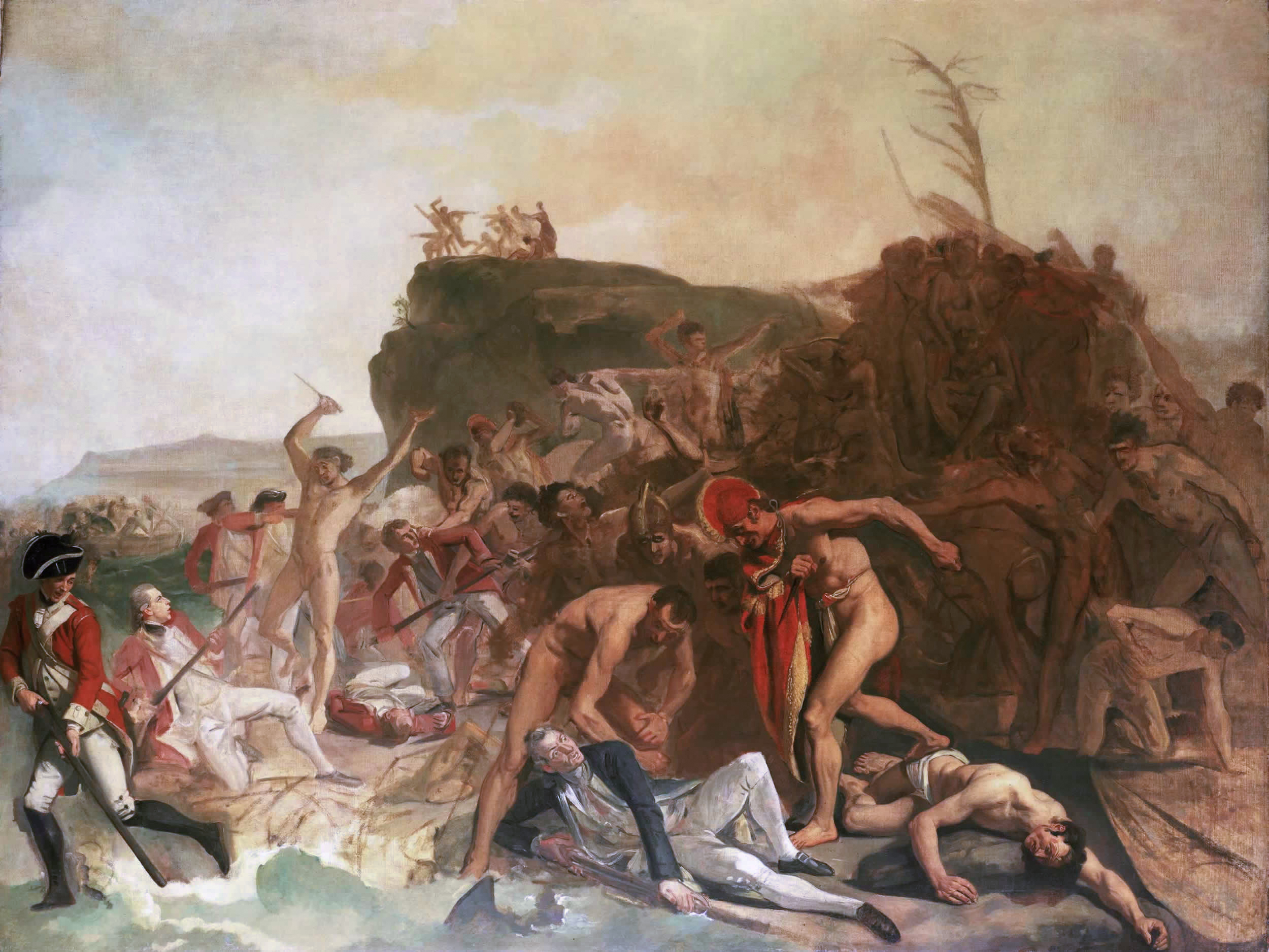
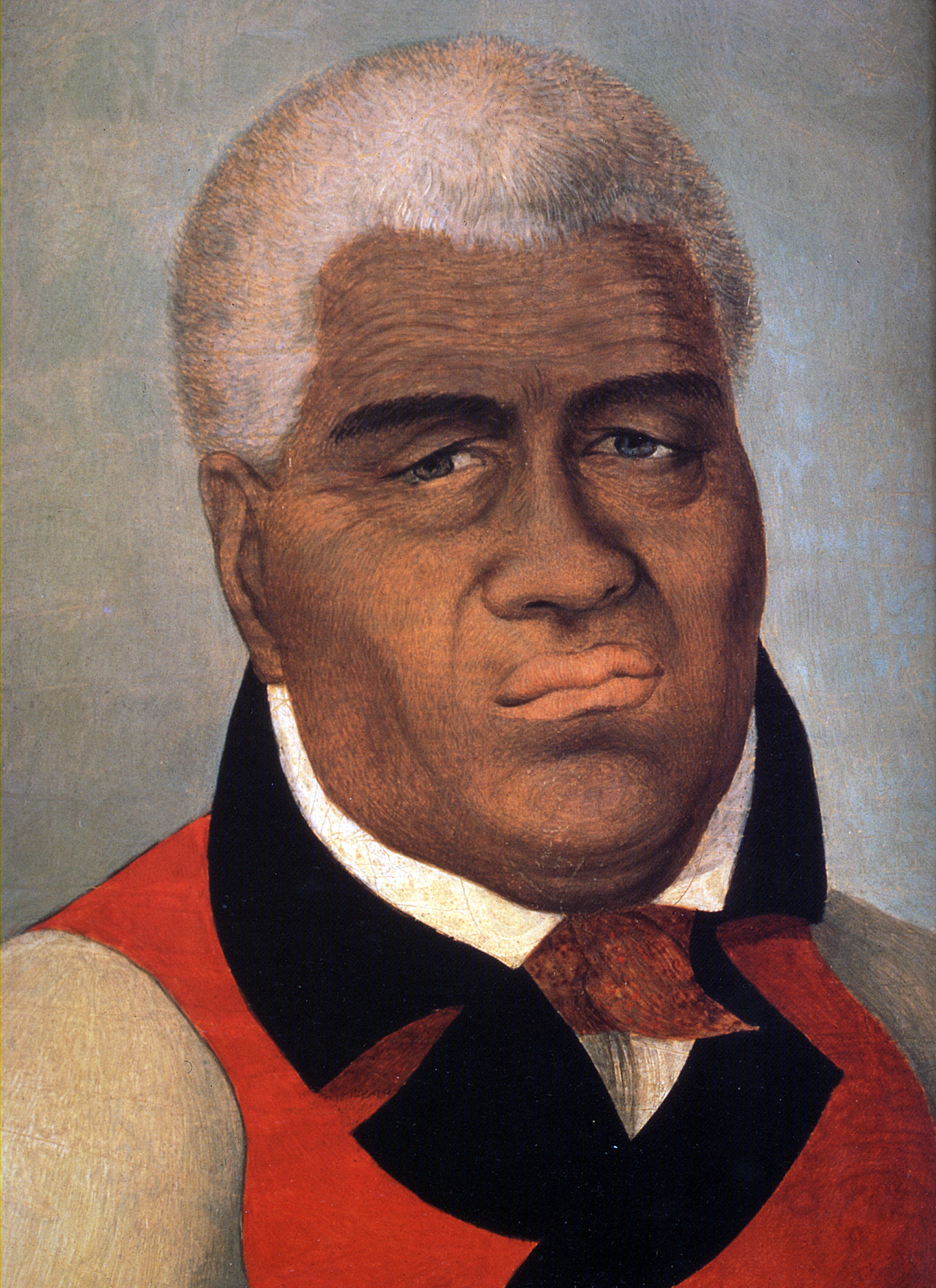
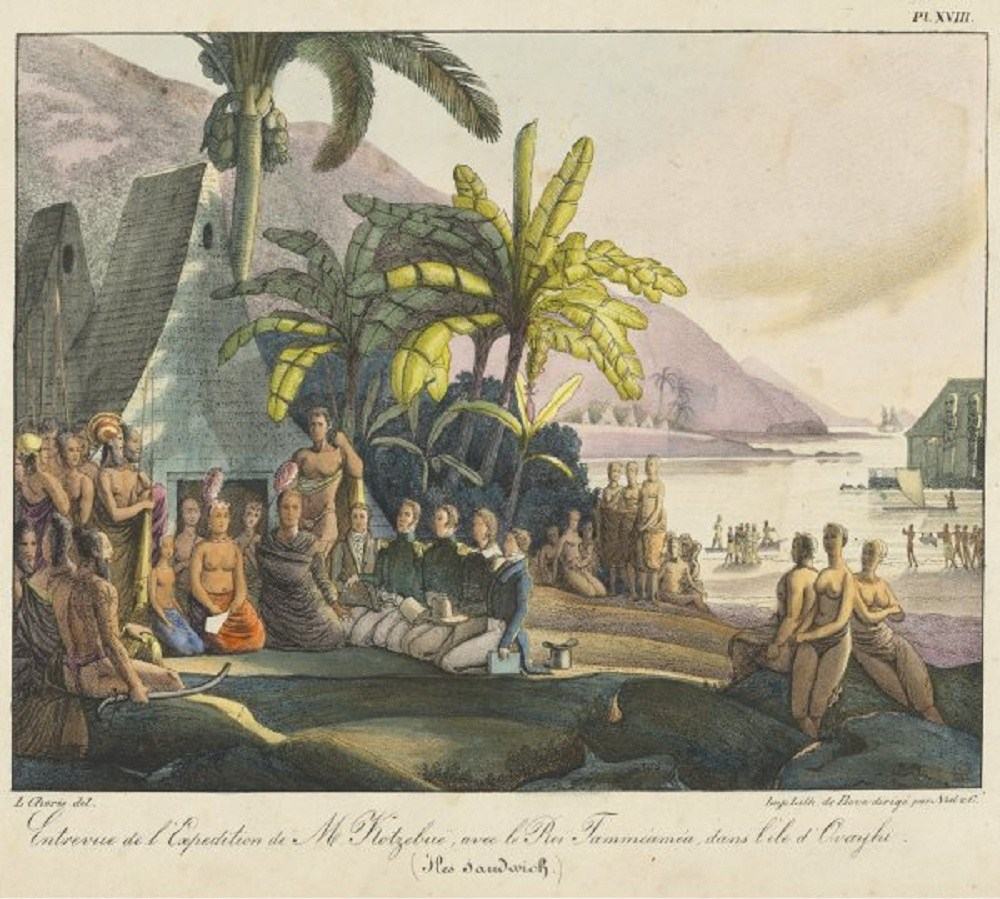
Pinea (w)	Liloa (k) (Note: "The mother of Umi was named Akahiakuleana, and though in humble life, she was a lineal descendant in the sixth generation from Kalahari, moku, the son of Kanipahu, with Hualani of the Nanaulu-Maweke line, and half-brother to Kalapana, the direct ancestor of Liloa. When parting from Akahiakuleana, Liloa gave her the ivory clasp (Palaoa) of his necklace, his feather wreath (Lei-hulu), and his Malo or waist-cloth, and told her that when the child was grown up, if it was a boy, to send him with these tokens to Waipio, and he would acknowledge him. The boy grew up with his mother and her husband, a fine, hearty, well-developed lad, foremost in all sports and athletic games of the time, but too idle and lazy in works of husbandry to suit his plodding stepfather. When Umi was nearly a full-grown young man, his stepfather once threatened to strike him as punishment for his continued idleness, when the mother averted the blow and told her husband, "Do not strike him; he is not your son; he is your chief;" and she then revealed the secret of his birth, and produced from their hiding-place the keepsakes which Liloa had left with her.")	Akahiakuleana (w)	Laielohelohe (w) (Note: Fornander-1880-p.87 "Piilani's children with Laielohelohe were Lono-a-Pii, who succeeded him as Moi of Maui; Kiha-a-Piilani, who was brought up to the age of manhood among his mother's relatives on Oahu; the daughter Piikea, just referred to; and another daughter, Kalaaiheana, of whom no further mention occurs. With another wife, named Moku-aHualeiakea, a Hawaii chiefess of the Ehu family, he had a daughter, Kauhiiliula-a-Piilani, who married Laninui-akaihupee, chief of Koolau, Oahu, and lineal descendant of Maweke through his son Kalehenui. And with still another wife, named Kunuunui-a-kapokii, whose pedigree has not been preserved, he had a son, Nihokela, whose eighth descendant was Kauwa, grandmother of the late King Lunalio on his father's side".)	Piʻilani (k)
Hakau (k)	Kapukinialiloa (w) (Note: Fornander-1880-p.103 "In the domestic relations of Umi, though blessed with a number of wives..." "He is known to have had at least six wives, viz.—(1.) Kulamea, whose family and descent are not reported, and who was the mother of Napunanahunui-a- Umi, a daughter; (2.) Makaalua, whose family has not been remembered, and who was the mother of Nohowaa-a-Umi, a daughter; (3.) Kapukini, a halfsister of Umi, and daughter of Liloa with Pinea, and who was the mother of Kealiiokaloa, a son, Kapulani or Kapukini, a daughter, and Keawenui-a- Umi, a son; (4.) Piikea, the daughter of Piilani, the Moi of Maui, and who was the mother of Aihakoko, a daughter, and Kumalae, a son; (5.) Mokuahualeiakea, descended from the great Ehu family in Kona, and who previously is said to have been the wife of Piilani of Maui. She was the mother of Akahiilikapu, a daughter. (6.) Henahena, said to be descended from Kahoukapu of Hawaii. She was the mother of Kamolanui-a-Umi, a daughter. There is one legend which mentions a seventh wife, named Haua, but her descent and her children are unknown, and her name is not mentioned on any of the genealogies that I possess. Of these eight children of Umi, Kealiiokaloa first, and Keawenui-a-Umi afterwards, succeeded their father as sovereigns of Hawaii".)	ʻUmi-a-Līloa (k) (Note: Fornander-1880-p.228 "There is not a commoner of Hawaii who would say that Umi-a-Liloa was not an ancestor of his, and a man who declines to acknowledge it does so for lack of information. Kapukini-a-Liloa was a royal consort of Umi-a-Liloa, and by whom Umi begat Keliiokaloa, a male, Kapulani, a female, and Keawenuiaumi, a male child. Piikea was a princess, being the daughter of Piilani, king of Maui, with Queen Laieloheloheikawai, and they (Piikea and Umi-a-Liloa) begat two male children, Kumalaenuiaumi and Aihakoko. Moku-a-Hualeiakea was also a princess among the grandchildren of Ehunuikaimalino of Kona, and she had a daughter, Akahiilikapu, by Umi-a-Liloa. He also had Ohenahenalani as wife and begat Kamolanuiaumi, and with the first children by the common women made Umi-a-Liloa the father of many children.")	Piʻikea (w)	Ohenahenalani (w)	Kihapiʻilani (k)	Kumaka (w)	Lonoapiʻi (k)
Keli‘iokaloa (k)	Makuahineapalaka (w)	Koihalawai (w) (Note: Fornander-1880-p.113 "[Keawenui-a-Umi]…" - "[H]is five wives, all of whom were of high and undoubted aristocratic families. These five wives were— (i.) Koihalawai or Koihalauwailaua, daughter of his sister Akahiilikapu and Kahakuma Kaliua, one of the tabu chiefs of Kauai. With this wife Keawenui had four children, three sons and a daughter: Kanaloakuaana, Kanaloakuakawaiea, Kanaloakapulehu, and Keakalavlani. (2) Haokalani, of the Kalona-iki family on Oahu, or from the great Ehu family on Hawaii through Hao-a-kapokii, the fourth in descent from Uhunui Kaimalino; the fact is not very clearly stated, though the presumption, from allusions in the legends, is in favour of the former. Her son was the celebrated Lonoikamakakiki. (3.) Hoopiliahae, whose parentage is not stated,*1 but whose son, Umiokalani, allied himself to the Maui chiefess Pii-maui-lani, and was the father of Hoolaaikaiwi, mother of the widely known and powerful Mahi family on Hawaii. (4.) Kamola-nui-a-Umi, the half-sister of Keawenui. Her daughter was Kapohelemai, who became the wife of her cousin Makua and mother of I, from whom the present reigning family descends. (5.) Hakaukalalapuakea, the granddaughter of Hakau, the brother of Umi. Her daughter was lliilikikuahine, through whom more than one family now living claims connection with the line of Liloa. All the legends mention a son of Keawenui named Pupuakea, who was endowed with lands in Kau, but none of the legends that I possess mention who his mother was. He remained true to Lonoikamakahiki when all the world forsook him, and was treated by Lono as a younger brother or very near kindred.*1 Author's note - "I have but one genealogy in which her parentage is referred to, and there she is said to be a descendant of Huanuikalalailai, through his son Kuhelaui, the brother of the Maui Paumakua.")	Keawenuiaʻumi (k)	Kamolanuiaumi (w)	Hoopiliahae W)	Kaakaupea (w)
Kukailani (k)	Kaohukiokalani (w)	Makuaakumalae (k)	Kapohelemai (w)	ʻUmiokalani (k)	Piʻimauilani (w)	Kamalalawalu (k)
Kanaloakuaʻana (k) (Note: "The children of KaikUani-Alii-Wahine-o-Puna with Kanaloakuaana were a son, Keakealanikane, and two daughters, Kealiiokalani and Kalani-o-Umi. She had no children with Lonoikamahiki, as previously stated. With his other wife, Kaikilanimaipanio, Lono had two sons, one called Keawehanauikawalu and the other Kaihikapumahana, from both of whom her Highness Ruth Keelikolani is the descendant on her father's and mother's sides.")	Kaikilani (w)	Ikanaka (k)	Kawalu (w)	Kanaloauoo (k) (Note: "Kanaloauoo was the ruling chief, the "Alii-ai-moku," he took for wife Hoolaaikaiwi, a daughter of Umiokalani and Piimauilani, and granddaughter of Keawenui-a-Umi. With this last wife he had the two sons Mahiolole and Mahihukui".)	Hoolaaikaiwi (w)	Kauhiakama (k)
Keakealanikane (k)	Kealiʻiokalani (w)	Makakaualiʻi (k) (Note: "To this period of Lono's reign belongs the episode of Iwikauikaua, another knight-errant of this stirring time. Iwikauikaua was the son of Makakaualii, who was the younger and only brother of Kaikilani-A Hi- Wahine-o-Puna. His mother was Kapukamola".)	Kapukāmola (w)	Mahiolole (k)	Kanekukailani (w)	Kalanikaumakaowākea (k) (Note: "Kalanikaumakaowakea had two wives— Kaneakauhi, or, as she was also called, Kaneakalau. With her he had a son, Lonohonuakini, who succeeded him as Moi, and a daughter, Piilaniwahine, who became the wife of Ahu-a-I, of the great I family on Hawaii, and mother of Lonomaaikanaka, the wife of Keaweikekahialiiokamoku and mother of Kalaninuiamamao. - Lonohonuakini's wife was Kalanikauanakinilani, with whom he had the following children:—Kaulahea, a son, who succeeded his father in the government; Lonomakaihonua, who was grandfather to the celebrated bard Keaulumoku; Kalaniomaiheuila, mother of Kalanikahimakeialii, the wife of Kualii of Oahu, and, through her daughter Kaionuilalahai, grandmother of Kahahana, the last independent king of Oahu, of the Oahu race of chiefs, who lost his life and his kingdom in the war with Maui in 1783".)
Keakamahana (w) (Note: "During the time of the revolt of Kanaloakuaana and the Hawaii chiefs against Lonoikamakahiki, it would appear that Iwikauikaua was already a grown-up young man, for he is reported as having espoused the cause of Lono and his aunt Kaikilani". "After this narrow escape Iwikauikaua went to Oahu, and there became the husband of Kauakahikuaanauakane, daughter of Kakuhihewa's son Kaihikapu. He is next heard of in the legends as having visited Maui, where one of his sisters, Kapukini, was the wife of the Moi Kauhi-a-Kama, and another sister, Pueopokii, was the wife of Kaaoao, the son of Makakukalani, and head of the Kaupo chief families who descended from Koo and Kaiuli. He finally returns to Hawaii, where he becomes the husband of Keakamahana, the daughter of his cousins Keakealanikane and Kealiiokalani, and who at their death became the Moi of Hawaii. When Lonoikamakahiki and Kaikilani, his wife, died, they were succeeded as Moi of Hawaii by Kaikilani's son Keakealanikane.") (Note: "The only husband known of Keakamahana was Iwikauikaua, above referred to, and with him she had a daughter called Keakealaniwahine, who succeeded her mother as Moi of Hawaii. With his other wife, the Oahu chiefess Kauakahi-kuaanaauakane, Iwikauikaua had a son, Kaneikaiwilani, who became one of the husbands of his half-sister Keakealaniwahine," "Keakealaniwahine had two husbands. The first was Kanaloaikaivrilewa, or, as he is called in some genealogies, Kanaloakapulehu. His pedigree is not given in any genealogy or legend that I have met with, but he was probably a descendant of Lonoikamakahiki's brother with the same name. The other husband was Kaneikaiwilani, who was the son of Iwikauikaua and Kaukahikuaanaauakane. With the first, Keakealani had a son named Keawe; with the second, she had a daughter named Kalanikauleleiaiwi.")	Iwikauikaua (k)	Ikuaana (w) (Note: Three sisters, Ikuaana, Umiulaakaahumanu and Umiaemoku were ancestors of King Kamehameha I and two families on the maternal side of Queen Liliuokalani. The youngest sister Umiaenaku was an ancestor of both Princess Ruth and Mrs. Bishop through Kanekapolei.)	Kū-a-Nuʻuanu (k) (Note: "Kamakaimoku's mother was Umiula-a-kaahumanu, a daughter of Mahiolole…" "Her father was Kuanuuanu, an Oahu chief, and in her childhood and youth she was brought up by her father on Oahu, her mother having gone back to Hawaii and espoused Kapahi-a-Ahu-Kane, the son of Ahu-a-I, and a younger brother of Lonomaaikanaka, the wife of Keawe. With Kuanuuanu Umiulaakaahumanu had another child, a son named Naili, who remained on Oahu, and followed his father as chief over the Waianae district".)	ʻUmiʻulaakaʻahumanu (w)	Ahu-a-ʻI (k)	Piʻilaniwahine II (w)
Kāneikaiwilani (k)	Keākealaniwahine (w)	Kanaloakapulehu (k)
Kauaua-a-Mahi (k) (Note: "[W]hen Kamehameha died in 1819 he was past eighty years old. His birth would thus fall between 1736 and 1740, probably nearer the former than the latter. His father was Kalanikupua-keoua, the half-brother of Kalaniopuu above referred to, and grandson of Keawe; his mother was Kekuiapoiwa II, a daughter of Kekelakekeokalani-a-keawe and Haae, the son of Kalanikauleleiaiwi and Kauaua-aMahi, and brother to Alapainui".)	Lonoikahaupu (k) (Note: "Whether Lonoikahaupu stopped on Oahu or Maui, or, if so, what befell him there, is not known; but on arriving at Hawaii he found that the court of Keaweikekahialiiokamoku, the Moi of Hawaii, was at the time residing in Kau. Eepairing thither, he was hospitably received, and his entertainment was correspondingly cordial, as well as sumptuous. The gay and volatile Kalanikauleleiaiwi, the imperious and high-born wife of Keawe, the Moi, became enamoured of the young Kauai chief, and after a while he was duly recognised as one of her husbands. From this union was born a son called Keawepoepoe, who became the father of those eminent Hawaii chiefs, Keeaumokupapaiahiahi, Kameeiamoku, and Kamanawa, who placed Kamehameha I. on the throne of Hawaii.")	Kalanikauleleiaiwi (w) (Note: "When grown up, Kamakaimoku was seen by Kalaninuiamamao on his visit to Oahu, and sent for to be his wife. Living with him at the court of Keawe, she bore him a son, Kalaniopuu, who afterwards became the Moi of Hawaii. This union was not of long duration, for within a year or two she left Kalaninuiamamao and became the wife of his brother, Kalanikeeaumoku, and to him she bore another son, Kalanikupuapaikalaninui Keoua, the father of Kamehameha I".) (Note: "Keawe s wives were—(1) Lonomaaikanaka, a daughter of Ahu-a-I and of Piilaniwahine. The former belonged to the powerful and widely spread I family of Hilo; the latter was the daughter of Kalanikaumakaowakea, the Moi of Maui. With her Keawe had two sons, Kalaninuiomamao and Kekohimoku} (2.) Kalanikauleleiaiwi, his half-sister, as before stated. With her he had Kalanikeeaumoku, a son, and Kekelakekeokalani, a daughter. (3.) Kanealae, a daughter of Lae, chief of the eastern parts of".)	Keaweʻīkekahialiʻiokamoku (k) (Note: "Keawe, surnamed "ikekahialiiokamoku," succeeded his mother, Keakealaniwahine, as the Moi of Hawaii. He is said to have been an enterprising and stirring chief, who travelled all over the group, and obtained a reputation for bravery and prudent management of his island. It appears that in some manner he composed the troubles that had disturbed the peace during his mother's time. It was not by force or by conquest, for in that case, and so near to our own times, some traces of it would certainly have been preserved on the legends. He probably accomplished the tranquillity of the island by diplomacy, as he himself married Lonomaaikanaka, the daughter of Ahua-I, and he afterwards married his son Kalaninuiomamao to Ahia, the granddaughter of Kuaana-a-I and cousin to Kuahuia's son, Mokulani, and thus by this double marriage securing the peace and allegiance of the Hilo chiefs.")	Lonomaʻaikanaka (w)	ʻUmiaemoku (w) (Note: "Kanekapolei is claimed by some to have been the daughter of Kauakahiakua, of the Maui royal family, and his wife Umiaemoku; by others she is said to have been of the Kau race of chiefs".)
Haʻae-a-Mahi (k) (Note: Kamakau-1992-p.68 "His mother was Ke-kuʻi-apo-iwa, daughter of Kekela and Haʻae, both of whom belonged to families of chiefs. His father was Keoua, younger brother of Ka-lani-ʻopuʻu, Ka-makaʻi-moku being the mother of both.")	Kekelakekeokalani (w)	Keawepoepoe (k)	Kanoena (w)	Kalanikeeaumoku (k)	Kalaninuiamamao (k)	Kamakaimoku (w)
Kekuʻiapoiwa II (w)	Keōua (k)	Kalaniʻōpuʻu (k)	Mahihelelima (k)	Kānekapōlei (w)
Kamehameha I

Kunuunuiakapokii (w)
Kealanaawaauli (w)
Nihokela (k)
Piʻilaniwahine I (w)
Kapukini III (w)
Kaneakauhi (w)
Lonohonuakini (k)	Kalanikauanakinilani (w)
Lonomakaihonua (k) (Note: In her book; "Hawaiian Genealogies: Extracted from Hawaiian Language Newspapers, Volume 2", Edith Kawelohea McKinzie states that the DeFries genealogy to Kauakahiakua was not supported by any accepted genealogy recorded and the correct parents were Lonomakaihonua and Kapoohiwi.)	Kapoohiwi (w)
Kauakahiakua (k) (Note: "Up to this period Kamehameha had had but two recognised wives. One was Kalola, referred to on page 201; the other was Peleuli. Her parents were Kamanawa and Kekelaokalani. The former a son of Keawepoepoe and grandson of Kalanikauleleiaiwi, of the royal Hawaii family, and the latter a daughter of Kauakahiakua and Kekuiapoiwa-Nui, both of the royal Maui family. With this Peleuli Kamehameha had four children:—(1.) Maheha Kapulikoliko, a daughter, of whom nothing more is known; (a) Kahoanoku Kinau, a son, whose wife was Kahakuhaakoi, a daughter of Kekuamanoha, of the Maui royal family, with whom he had a daughter, Keahikuni Kekauonohi, who died in 1847; (3.) Kaikookalani, a son, whose wife was Haaheo, a niece of Keawemauhili by his sister Akahi, and who afterwards became the wife of Kuakini, one of the brothers of Kaahumanu; (4.) Kiliwehi, a daughter, who became the wife of Kamehamehakauokoa".)	Kekuiapoiwa I (w)
Kamanawa (k)	Kekelaokalani (w)
Peleuli (w)

Explanatory notes and reference sources

Notes:

Kalākaua family tree

Key- (k)= Kane (male/husband)
(w)= wahine (female/wife)
Subjects with bold titles, lavender highlighted, bold box= Direct bloodline
Bold title, bold, grey box= Aunts, uncles, cousins line
Bold title, bold white box= European or American (raised to aliʻi status by marriage or monarch's decree)
Regular name and box= makaʻāinana or untitled foreign subject

Kāneikaiwilani (k)
Lonoikahaupu (k)
Keawepoepoe (k)
Kameʻeiamoku (k)
Kepoʻokalani (k)
Kamanawa II (k)
Kapaʻakea (1815–1866)
Kaliokalani (1835–1852)

Kanalohanaui (k)	Keākealani (w)	Ahu-a-ʻI (k)	Piʻilani (w) II	Moana (k)
Kalanikauleleiaiwi (w)	Kauauaʻamahi (k)	Keawe II (k)	Lonomaʻaikanaka (w)	Kauhiahaki (k)	ʻIliki-ā-Moana (w)
Kanoena (w)	Haʻaeamahi (k)	Kekelakekeokalani (w)	Alapaʻi Nui (k)	Keaka (w)	Keeaumoku Nui (k)	Kamakaimoku (w)	Kaeamamao (k) (Note: Genealogy of Liliuokalani, page 400, appendix B, No. 2 Queen of Hawaii, Liliuokalani (1898). Hawaii's Story by Hawaii's Queen. University of Hawaii Press. p. 400. "Kapaakea genealogy.")	Kaolanialiʻi (w)
Kamakaʻeheikuli (w)	Keōua (k)	Kahekili II (k)	Kekuiapoiwa II (w)	Ikuaʻana (w)	Heulu (k)	Moana (w)	Keaweʻopala (k)	Nohomualani (k)
Keaweaheulu (k)	Ululani (w)	Hakau (w)	Kanaʻina (k)	Kauwa (w)	Eia (k)
Alapai (w)	Keohohiwa (w)	Keōpūolani (w)	Kamehameha I	Kalaniʻōpuʻu (k)	Kānekapōlei (w)	Kiʻilaweau (k)	Nāhiʻōleʻa (k)	Kahoʻowaha II (w)	Inaina (w)
Hao (K)	Kailipakalua (w)
Kamokuiki (w)	ʻAikanaka (k)	Kamaeokalani (w)	Kaōleiokū (k)	Keoua (w)	Luahine (w)	Kalaʻimamahu	Kaheiheimālie
Kamehameha II	Kamehameha III	Kekūanaōʻa (k)	Kahalaiʻa; Luanuʻu (k)	Pauahi (w)	Kīnaʻu (w)	Pākī (k)	Kōnia (w)	Kanaʻina II	Kaʻahumanu III
Keohokālole (1816–1869)	Keʻelikōlani (w)	Kamehameha IV	Kamehameha V	Kaʻahumanu IV	Pauahi Bishop (w)	Bishop (k)	Lunalilo (k)
Kalākaua (1836–1891)	Kapiʻolani (1834–1899)	Liliʻuokalani (1838–1917)	Dominis (1832–1891)	Kaʻiulani (1842–?)	Kaʻiminaʻauao (1845–1848)	Cleghorn (1835–1910)	Likelike (1851–1887)	Leleiohoku II (1854–1877)
Kaʻiulani (1875–1899)

== Legacy ==
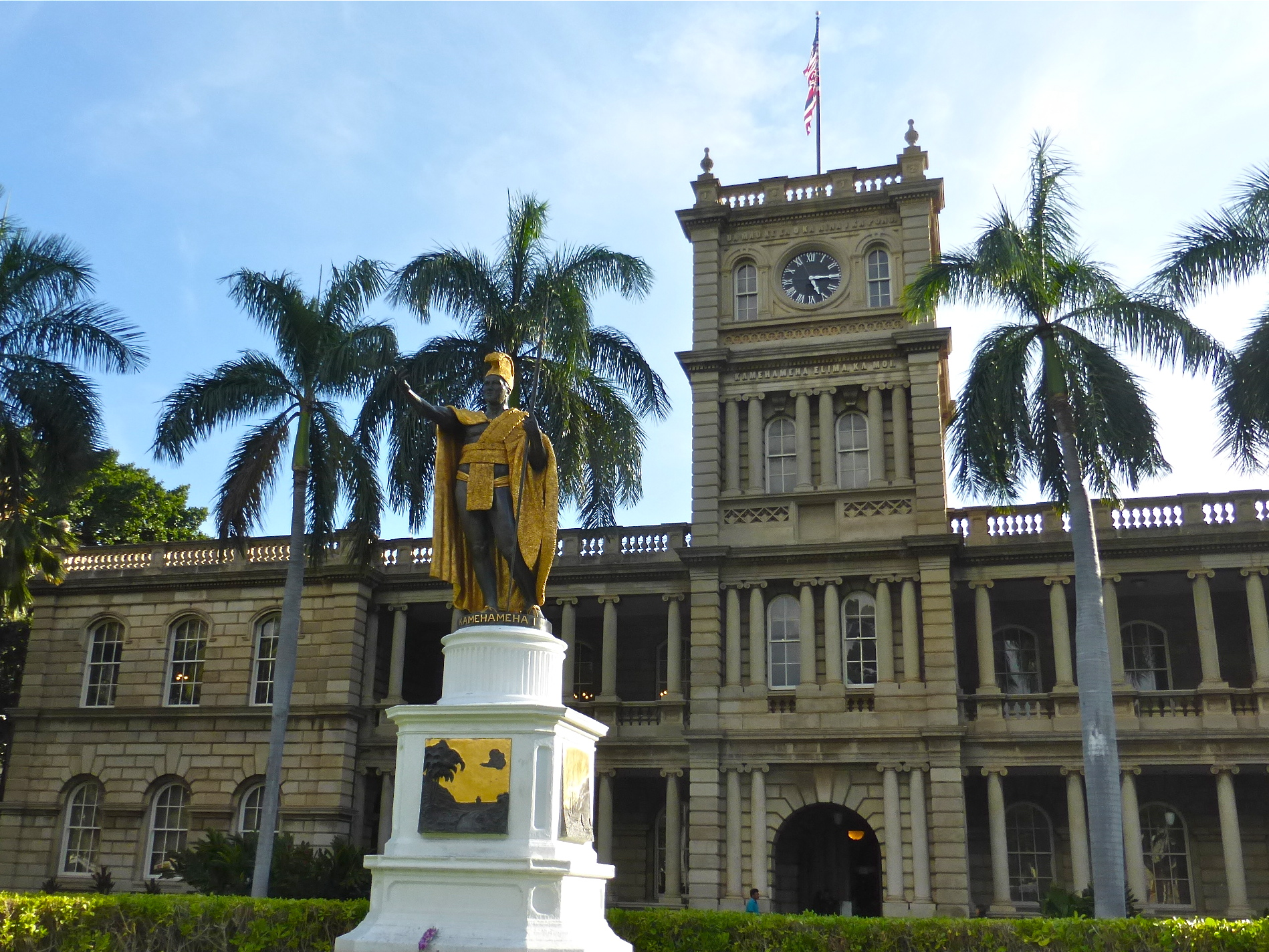
Aliʻiōlani Hale, Honolulu, with statue of Kamehameha I

- The Hawaiian public holiday King Kamehameha I Day is named after and honors King Kamehameha I. It was first proclaimed in 1871 by his grandson, King Kamehameha V.
- The USS Kamehameha, a Benjamin Franklin-class ballistic missile submarine was named after him.
- Kamehameha I appears on quarters issued in 2008 commemorating Hawaiʻi as part of the 50 State quarters program of the U.S. Mint.
- The state of Hawaii gave a statue of him to the National Statuary Hall Collection in Washington, D.C., as one of two statues it is entitled to install there.

=== In popular culture ===
- In the anime/manga series Dragon Ball, Master Roshi, teacher of the main protagonist Goku, has a signature move named after the Hawaiian King. Creator Akira Toriyama was quoted in an interview stating "I was wondering whether there was a decent name along the lines of "something-something-Ha", when my wife said as a joke, "Kamehameha would be fine, wouldn't it?" so I used it as-is. Of course, it's taken from King Kamehameha of Hawaii."
- The Apple TV series Chief of War depicts the unification of the Hawaiian Islands under Kamehameha I. Kaina Makua portrays him.

Kamehameha I House of Kamehameha Born: ? 1738/1759 Died: May 8 1819
Royal titles
Founding of the Kingdom of Hawaii	King of the Hawaiian Islands; 1795–1819	Succeeded by Kamehameha II with regent Kaʻahumanu
Preceded by Kīwalaʻō	Ruler of North Hawaiʻi; 1782–1795	Succeeded by himself as King of the Hawaiian Islands
Preceded by Kalanikūpule	Ruler of the Island of Maui and Oʻahu; 1795–1810	Succeeded by himself as King of the Hawaiian Islands
Preceded by Kaumualiʻi	Ruler of the Island of Kauaʻi and Niʻihau; 1810–1819	Succeeded by himself as King of the Hawaiian Islands
