= Kapohauola =

Ancient Hawaiian high chiefess

- High Chiefess of Maui
- Born: Ca. 1503
- Spouse: Kakae ʻEhu
- Issue: Kahekili I ʻEhunuikaimalino
- Father: King Kahokuohua
- Mother: Hiʻikawaiula
- Religion: Hawaiian religion

Kapohauola was a High Chiefess in ancient Hawaii, Chiefess of Hawaiʻi island and Queen consort of Maui. She is mentioned in ancient legends and was also called Kualua. Samuel Kamakau mentioned her in his book Tales and Traditions of the People of Old.

== Biography ==
Kapohauola was a sister of Princess Kapohanaupuni of Hilo. This means that her parents were King Kahokuohua and his wife Hiʻikawaiula.

She was born around 1503. She married her nephew Kakae, King of Maui. Their son was famous King Kahekili I, who is also known as "Kahekili the Great". He impoverished his Kingdom and people by many war campaigns.

Kapohauola was a grandmother of beautiful Princess Keleanohoanaapiapi who is the main character of one ancient chant, and Kawaokaohele, who was the King of Maui.

She also married High Chief ʻEhu, son of the King Kuaiwa. She bore a son named ʻEhunuikaimalino, who was a Chief of Kona during the reign of Kauholanuimahu. He married Keana and Opaʻekalani and had a child called Paula (likely son).

== Family tree ==
Family tree of Kapohauola

Kakae
Kahekili I
Kapohauola
Kawaokaohele
Haukanuimakamaka
Piʻilani
Kepalaoa
Lono-a-Piʻilani
Kalamakua
Laielohelohe
Kakae
Kahekili I
Kapohauola
Keleanohoanaapiapi
Haukanuimakamaka
