= Kawalakiʻi =

Hawaiian male god

- Venerated in: Hawaiian religion
- Adherents: Lono-a-Piilani; Kamehameha I
- Gender: Male

According to the Hawaiian mythology, Kawalakiʻi is a name of one male god, but his ancestry in the myth and the attributes are unknown.

Hawaiian High Chief ʻUmi of Hāna made an idol of Kawalakiʻi on the island of Maui.

King of Maui Lono believed that he would be protected by the idol. The idol was destroyed by one soldier of King of Hawaiʻi, Umi-a-Liloa, whose wife Piʻikea was a sister of Lono.

King of Hawaii Kamehameha I was a worshiper of Kawalakiʻi.
