= Lono-a-Piʻilani =

Lono-a-Piʻilani was Aliʻi of Maui. He was a chief of that Hawaiian island and was named after god Lono.

== Biography ==
Lono was a son of the King Piʻilani and grandson of Kawaokaohele.

He was a brother of Kiha-a-Piʻilani and Piʻikea and uncle of the chief Kumalae, ruler of Hilo.

Shortly after Piʻilani died, Lono succeeded him. When Kiha had to flee from Maui, he sought refuge with his sister Piʻikea, wife of ʻUmi-a-Liloa, king of Hawaiʻi, at the court of ʻUmi. Here his sister advocated his cause so warmly, and insisted with ʻUmi so urgently, that the latter was induced to espouse the cause of the younger brother against the older, and prepared an expedition to invade Maui, depose Lono, and raise Kiha-a-Piʻilani to the throne of his father. ʻUmi summoned the chiefs of the various districts of Hawaii to prepare for the invasion of Maui. When all the preparations were ready, ʻUmi headed the expedition in person, accompanied by his wife, Piikea, and her brother and by his bravest warriors. Crossing the waters of ʻAlenuihāhā Channel between Maui and Hawaiʻi island, the fleet of ʻUmi effected a landing at Kapueokahi, the harbour of Hāna, Maui, where Lono have continued to reside after Piilani's death.

Having failed to prevent the landing of ʻUmi's forces, Lono retired to the fortress on the top of the neighbouring hill called Kauwiki, which in those days was considered almost impregnable, partly from its natural strength and partly from the superstitious terror inspired by a gigantic idol Kawalakiʻi. ʻUmi laid siege to the fort of Kauwiki, and, after some delay and several unsuccessful attempts, finally captured the fort, destroyed the idol, and Lono having fallen in the battle, Kiha-a-Piʻilani was proclaimed and acknowledged as a king. Having accomplished this, ʻUmi and his forces returned to Hawaiʻi.

== Family ==
Lono married Kealana-a-waʻauli, a great granddaughter of Kahakuakane, Aliʻi aimoku of Kauai, by whom he had a daughter named Kaʻakaupea, who became the wife of her uncle Nihokela, and mother of Piʻilaniwahine, the wife of Kamalalawalu. He had another daughter named Moihala, from whom descended Kapuleiolaa, one of the wives of Kanaloauoʻo and ancestress of Sarai Hiwauli, wife of John Papa ʻĪʻī.

Kakae
Kahekili I
Kapohauola
Kawaokaohele
Haukanuimakamaka
Piʻilani
Kepalaoa
Lono-a-Piʻilani
Mailikukahi
Kalonanui
Kanepukoa
Kalamakua
Kaipuholua
Laielohelohe
Kakae
Kahekili I
Kapohauola
Keleanohoanaapiapi
Haukanuimakamaka
