= Kakaʻe =

Hawaiian traditional ruler

- High Chief of Maui
- Consort: Kapohauola (aunt)
- Issue: Kahekili I
- Father: Kaulahea I, High Chief of Maui
- Mother: Kapohanaupuni

Kakaʻe was High Chief of the island of Maui. Kakaʻe's name is sometimes given as Kakaʻeloiki. Kakaʻe is mentioned in old chants.

== Biography ==
Kakaʻe was a son of Chief Kaulahea I of Maui and his sister-wife, High Chiefess Kapohanaupuni of Hilo. His brother was Kakaʻalaneo. He and his brother appear to have jointly ruled over the islands of Maui and Lanai.

=== Reign ===
The brothers' courts were at Lahaina which at that time still preserved its ancient name of Lele. Kakaʻe was surnamed Kaleo-iki, and was considered as deficient in mental qualities. Some traditions state that Luaia was his grandson, but most of the genealogies states Luaia was the grandson of Kakaʻalaneo.

=== Marriage ===
Kakaʻe's wife's name was Kapohauola, and she was also the wife of ʻEhu, the son of Kūʻaiwa, on the Hawaiian Pili line, and thus established the contemporaneity of these islands' monarchs. Kapohauola was said to have been Kakaʻe's maternal aunt. Kakae's only known son was Kahekili I. His brother appeared to succeed him to the dignity and title of aliʻi. After Kakaʻalaneo's death, Kakae's son succeeded him as aliʻi rather than Kakaʻalaneo's own children.

Preceded by Kaulahea I	Aliʻi nui of Maui	Succeeded by Kakaalaneo
