= Kumalae =

- Aliʻi of Hilo
- Issue: Makuanui
- Father: ʻUmi-a-Liloa
- Mother: Piʻikea
- Religion: Hawaiian religion

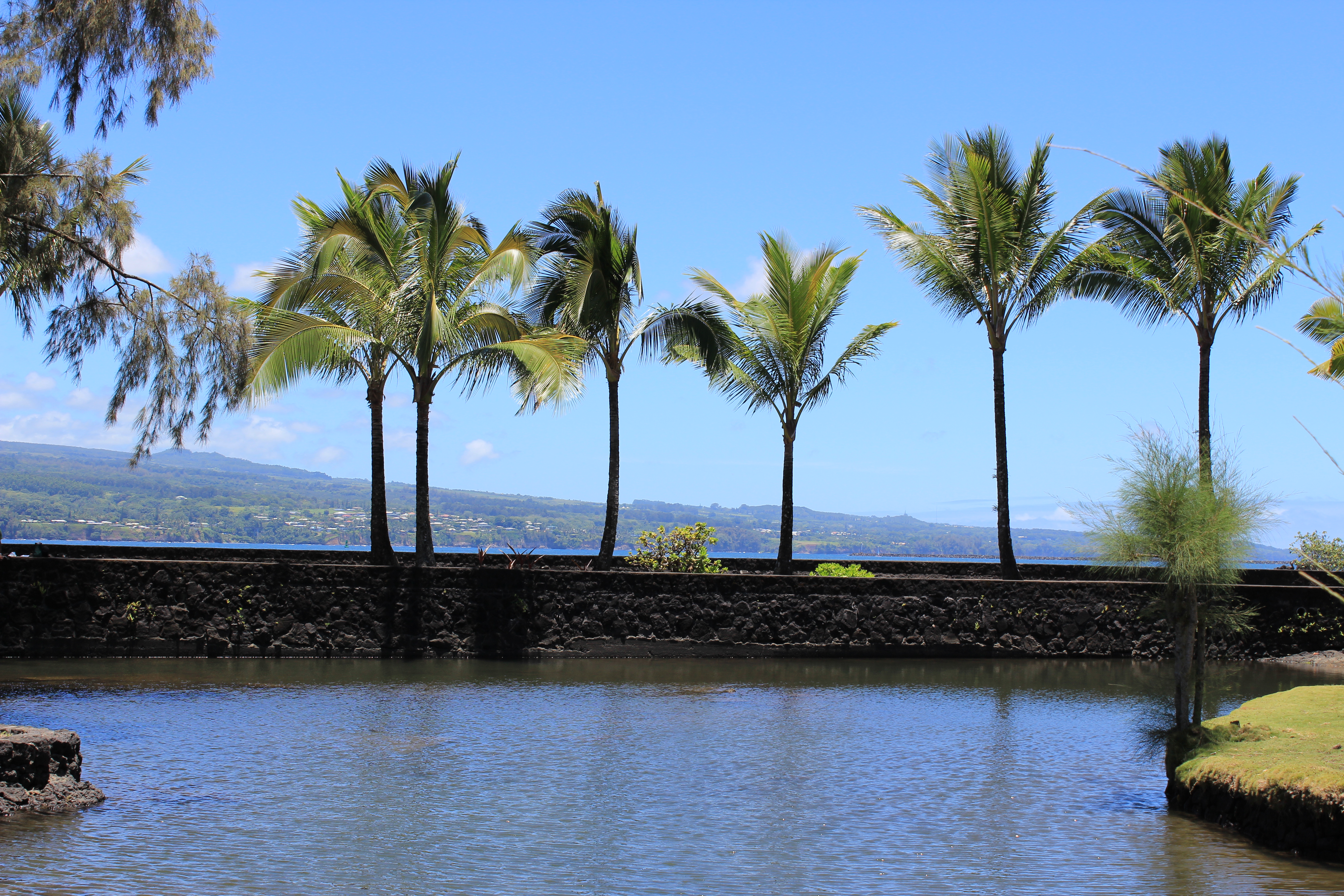
View looking across Hilo Bay towards the Hamakua Coast

Kumalae was a Hawaiian High Chief, Aliʻi Nui (ruler) of Hilo. He is also known as Kumalae-nui-a-ʻUmi ("Kumalae the Great, son of ʻUmi").

He was born about 1648.

His father was ʻUmi-a-Liloa, Aliʻi of Hawaiʻi. His mother was Piʻikea, daughter of Piʻilani of Maui.

Kumalae’s uncles were Lono-a-Piʻilani and Kiha-a-Piʻilani and his brothers were Keliʻiokaloa and Keawe Nui-a-ʻUmi.

Kumalae was given the district of Hilo to rule as its district chief, and his successors would be notable as being fiercely resistant to the main line of the Hawaiian chiefs descended from his elder brothers.

Kumalae married Kuanu'upu'awalau (Kua-nuʻu-pü’awa-lau, Ku-nu'u-nui-pu'awa-lau, Ke-kai-ha'a-kuloulanio-Kahiki). They had a son, Makuanui, who was his successor as Aliʻi of Hilo.
