= Kamalālāwalu =

Ancient Hawaiian ruler

Kamalālāwalu (Kama-lālā-walu = "Son of eight branches") was the supreme ruler Aliʻi-ʻAimoku of Maui in ancient Hawaii, known to us today from the old chants. He was a great warrior chief and highly regarded for his leadership and resource management. Kamalālāwalu invaded Hawaiʻi Island and engaged in a disastrous battle in Kohala. Kamalālāwalu was killed and his invasion force was decimated. His son Kauhi-a-Kama survived, returned to Maui and became its next ruler.

He was the successor of his father, High Chief Kiha-a-Piʻilani and Queen Kumaka and grandson of Piʻilani and nephew of Queen Piʻikea.

Kamalālāwalu married a woman called Piʻilaniwahine I and their children were:

- Kalakauaʻehu (son)
- Paikalakaua (son)
- Piʻilani-Kapokulani (daughter)
- Kekaikuihaiaokekuʻimanono (daughter)
- Umikalakaua (son)
- Kaunoho I (son)
- Kauhiakama (son and successor)

It was Kamalalawalu who gives the name Maui-of-Kama to the island.

Petroglyphs thought to depict the defeat of Kamalalawalu by Lonoikamakahiki can be viewed at low tide near the temples on Kahaluu Bay.
