= Kakaʻalaneo =

- High Chief of Maui
- Consort: Kaualua; Kanikaniaula
- Father: Kaulahea I
- Mother: Kapohanaupuni
- Religion: Hawaiian religion

Kakaʻalaneo was chief of the island of Maui.

== Biography ==
Kakaʻalaneo was a son of High Chief Kaulahea I of Maui and Chiefess Kapohanaupuni of Hilo. Kakaʻalaneo's brother was Kakae. Kakaʻalaneo appears to be the center of the legends of that reign. He and his brother appear to have jointly ruled Maui and Lānaʻi with his elder brother holding the title of Aliʻi.

The brothers' courts were at Lāhainā.

Tradition has gratefully remembered Kakaʻalaneo as the one who planted the breadfruit trees in Lāhainā, for which the place in later times became so famous for.

== Legend of Kaululaʻau ==
A marvelous legend is still told of one of Kakaʻalaneo's sons, named Kaululaʻau, who, for some of his wild pranks at his father's court in Lāhainā, was banished to Lānaʻi, which island was said to have been terribly haunted by Akua-ino, ghosts and goblins. Kaululaʻau, however, by his prowess and skill, exorcised the spirits, brought about peace and order on the island, and was in consequence restored to the favour of his father.

== Family ==
It was said that Kaululaʻau's mother was Kanikaniaula of the Kamauaua family, through Haili, a brother of Keʻoloʻewa. One legend mentions six children of Kaululaʻau by the names of Kuihiki, Kuiwawau, Kuiwawau-e, Kukahaulani, Kumakaʻakaʻa, and Ulamealani. No further record of them are kept, however.

With another wife, named Kaualua, Kakaʻalaneo had a son Kaihiwalua, who was the father of Luaia, who became the husband of the noted Chiefess Kūkaniloko. Kakaʻalaneo is also said to have had a daughter named Wao, who caused the watercourse in Lāhainā called Auwaiawao to be dug and named after her.

Kakaʻalaneo was succeeded by his nephew Kahekili I, son of his brother.

| Preceded by Kakae | Aliʻi nui of Maui | Succeeded by Kahekili I |
