= Kawaokaohele =

- Aliʻi of Maui
- Spouse: Kepalaoa
- Issue: Piʻilani
- Father: Kahekili I
- Mother: Haukanuimakamaka
- Religion: Hawaiian religion

Kawaokaohele (Hawaiian for "our days of poverty") was a High Chief who ruled the island of Maui in ancient Hawaii.

== Biography ==
Kawaokaohele was a son of Kahekili I and Haukanuimakamaka, who was a High Chiefess and is also known as Hauanuihonialawahine. She was born on Kauai, but married Kahekili on Maui. Kawaokaohele succeeded his father. His reign was prosperous. No war occurred during Kawaokaohele was ruler of the island.

Kawaokaohele’s sister, beautiful Keleanohoanaʻapiʻapi, was abducted and married into the noble family of Oahu.

=== Marriage ===
Kawaokaohele had married Kepalaoa, whose pedigree is not remembered, but who was probably a Maui chiefess or an Oahu princess. She bore a famous son, Piʻilani, and Kawaokaohele was succeeded by him.

== Legend ==
In one ancient legend, Kawaokaohele is represented as the foster father of Piʻilani.

According to this old story, god Kū was the biological father of Piʻilani.

== Family tree ==
Kahekili I of Maui
Kawaokaohele
Hauanuihonialawahine, Chiefess of Kauai
Piʻilani, King of Maui
Kepalaoa
Piʻikea, Chiefess of Maui and Hawaiʻi
Kumalae, Chief of Hilo
ʻUmi-a-Liloa, King of Hawaiʻi
