= Kiha-a-Piʻilani =

Kiha-a-Piilani was an Aliʻi nui of Maui (tribal chief of Maui). He was born ca. 1510.

Kiha was a son of Piʻilani, who built great heiau (temple). Kihaʻs mother was named La’ieloheloheikawai.

Shortly after Piʻilani died, Kihaʻs brother Lono-a-Piʻilani succeeded him. When Kiha had to flee from Maui, he sought refuge with his sister Piʻikea, wife of ʻUmi-a-Liloa, king of Hawaiʻi, at the court of ʻUmi. Here his sister advocated his cause so warmly, and insisted with ʻUmi so urgently, that the latter was induced to espouse the cause of the younger brother against the older, and prepared an expedition to invade Maui, depose Lono, and raise Kiha-a-Piʻilani to the throne of his father. ʻUmi summoned the chiefs of the various districts of Hawaii to prepare for the invasion of Maui. When all the preparations were ready, ʻUmi headed the expedition in person, accompanied by his wife and her brother and by his bravest warriors. Crossing the waters of ʻAlenuihāhā Channel between Maui and Hawaiʻi, the fleet of ʻUmi effected a landing at Kapueokahi, the harbour of Hāna, Maui, where Lono had continued to reside after Piilani's death.

Having failed to prevent the landing of ʻUmi's forces, Lono retired to the fortress on the top of the neighbouring hill called Kauwiki. ʻUmi laid siege to the fort of Kauwiki, and, after some delay and several unsuccessful attempts, finally captured the fort, and Lono having fallen in the battle, Kiha-a-Piʻilani was proclaimed and acknowledged as a king. Having accomplished this, ʻUmi and his forces returned to Hawaiʻi.

== Personal life ==
Kiha married Kumaka (Chiefess of Hana). Their son was Kamalalawalu.
