= Kauhiakama =

King of Maui in ancient Hawaii

Kauhiakama (Kauhi-a-Kama) was a king of the island of Maui in ancient Hawaii.

He was a son of Chief Kamalalawalu and his wife, Piʻilaniwahine I.

Kauhiakama married Kapukini, who was descended from Līloa. Their child was son Kalanikaumakaowākea.

Kauhiakama made an unsuccessful attempt to conquer the island of Oahu.
