= Piʻilani =

- Chief of Maui
- Spouse: La’ieloheloheikawai; Mokuahualeiakea; Kunuʻunuiakapokiʻi
- Issue: Lono-a-Piʻilani; Kiha-a-Piʻilani; Piʻikea, Chiefess of Maui and Hawaiʻi
- Father: Kawaokaohele
- Mother: Kepalaoa
- Religion: Hawaiian religion

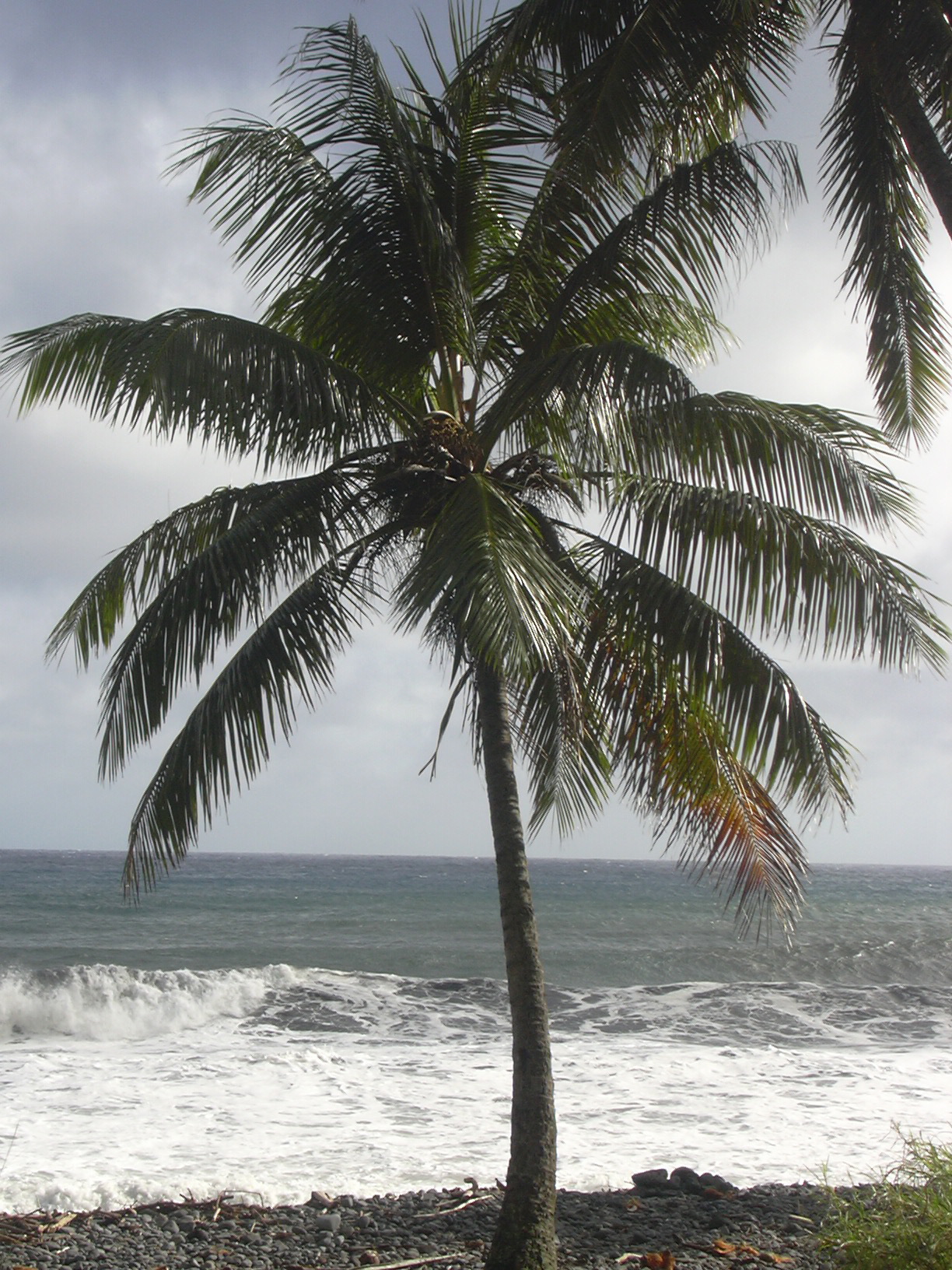
Coconut tree on Maui, island of Piʻilani

Piʻilani ("ascent to heaven") (born ca. 1460) ruled as Chief of the island of Maui in the later part of the 15th century. At the time Maui was an independent kingdom within the islands of Hawaii.

He was the first Aliʻi to unite the island under a single line. His rule was peaceful for most of his reign. His father was Kawaokaohele and his mother was Kepalaoa. Pilʻilani and his offspring are important in legends of Maui, in the same way that Līloa and his son ʻUmi-a-Liloa are in the legends of the island of Hawaii. The two family lines of Piʻilani and Liloa were closely associated although from separate islands. ʻUmi was a supporter of Kiha-a-Piʻilani, Piʻilani's son, when he went to war. The lineage continued in west Hawaii and east Maui in lesser lines and in the lines of Moana Kane from Liloa and Piʻilaniwahine from Piʻilani in the couple's marriage and offspring. Piʻilani and his sons were circumcised.

Piʻilani's is a descendant of Puna-i-mua. His father and grandfathers came from western Maui. Under Piʻilani for the first time this family controlled the eastern side as well. Piʻilani began building a roadway to encircle the entire island, the first such road in the islands. It was wide enough for eight men to walk beside each other. It was completed by his son. Some sections of Piʻilani Highway follow the old path. In places, the old stones are still visible. After Piʻilani's death the line of succession became a struggle similar to that of ʻUmi and Hakua of Hawaii.

== Family tree ==
Līloa
Umi-a-Liloa
Kauahaeakuaimakani
Kuleanakapiko
Kapiko
Akahiakuleana
Keanianihooleilei
Kumalae
Kahekili I
Kawaokaohele
Haukanuimakamaka
Piʻilani
Kepalaoa
Piʻikea
Kalonanui
Kalamakua
Kaipuholua
Laielohelohe
Kahekili I
Keleanohoanaapiapi
Haukanuimakamaka
