= Lei niho palaoa =

Hawaiian neck ornament

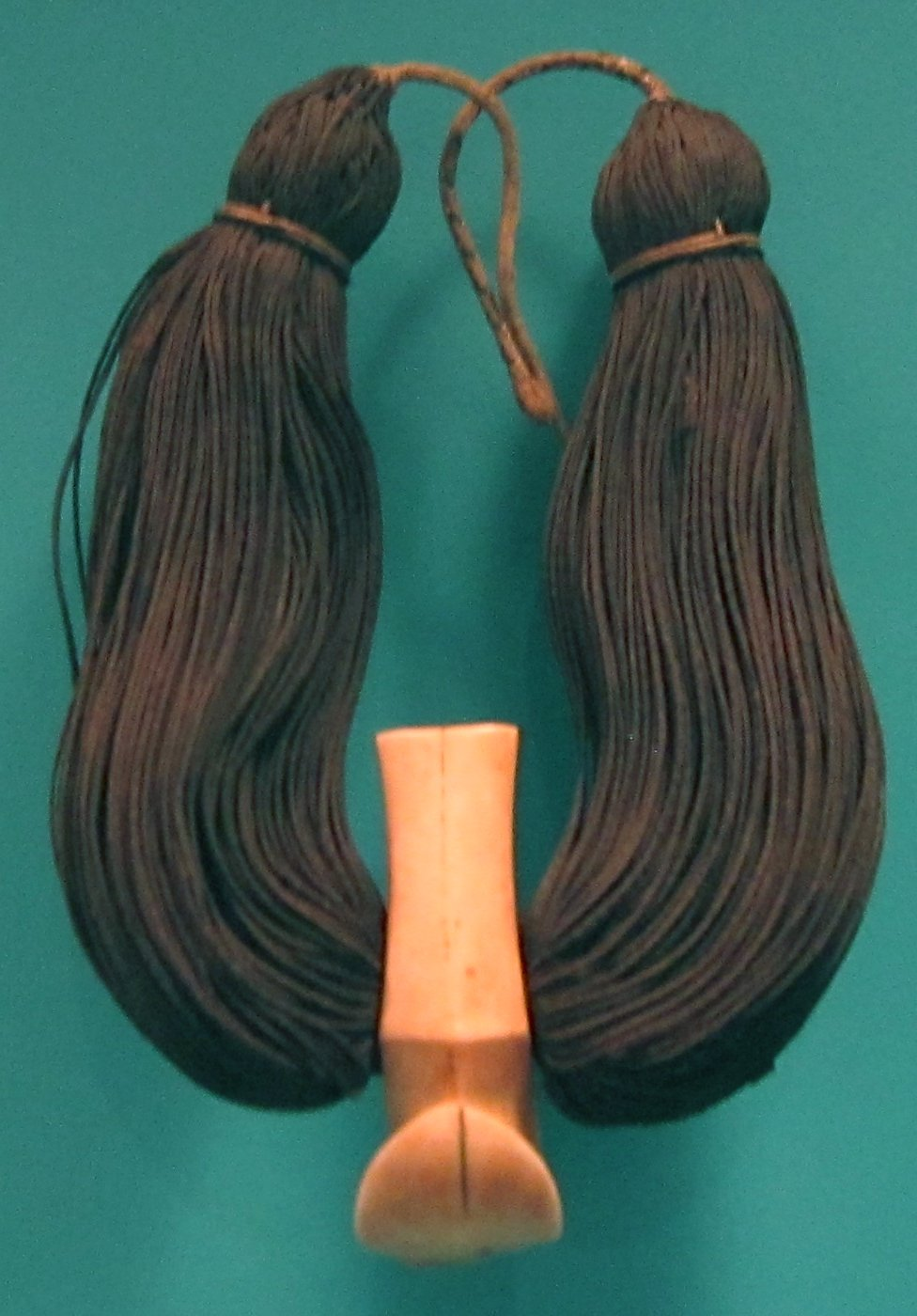
19th century lei niho palaoa in the Honolulu Museum of Art

A lei niho palaoa is a Hawaiian neck ornament traditionally worn by aliʻi (chiefs) of both sexes. The 19th century examples are most commonly made of a whale tooth carved into a hook-shape suspended by plaited human hair.

The symbolism is not known; it may represent a tongue that speaks the law, or may represent a vessel for mana (inherited virtue). Precontact lei niho palaoa were less than two inches in length, and were not only made of whale ivory, but also of shell, bone, wood, stone, and coral. Sometimes, several of these smaller pendants were strung on twisted human hair. The Bishop Museum has a lei niho palaoa with a hair bundle having a circumference of 7.5 inches. It is made from a single eight-ply square braid cord, measuring 1,708 feet, looped back and forth over 1000 times on each side.
