= Keliʻiokaloa =

- Aliʻi Aimoku of Hawaii
- Reign: c. 1525 – c. 1545
- Predecessor: Umi-a-Liloa
- Successor: Keawenuiaumi
- Born: c. 1500
- Died: c. 1545 (aged 44–45)
- Issue: Kukailani
- Father: Umi-a-Liloa
- Mother: Aliʻi Kapukini-a-Liloa

Keliʻiokaloa (c. 1500–c. 1545) was the Aliʻi Nui of the island of Hawaiʻi from c. 1525 to c. 1545. He was the sovereign king or chief of the island of Hawaiʻi.

== Life ==
Keliʻiokaloa was the eldest son of Umi-a-Liloa, Aliʻi Aimoku of Hawaiʻi, by his third wife and half-sister, Aliʻi Kapukini-a-Liloa, daughter of Liloa, Aliʻi Aimoku of Hawaiʻi.

He succeeded on the death of his father in the year 1525.

In 1545, he was deposed by his younger brother Keawenui-a-ʻUmi. After the death of Keliiokaloa there existed a season of conflict and confusion, which the great district chiefs of the island of Hawaii refused to acknowledge the kingship of Keawe. Keawenui-a-`Umi defeated and killed each of his rivals and restored order and peace. In the legend and chant of Lonoikamakahiki, the son of Keawenui, the names of the six district chiefs whom his father defeated are given: Palahalaha, son of Wahilani of Kohala; Pumaia, son of Wanua of Hamakua; Hilo-Hamakua, son of Kulukulua of Hilo; Lililehua, son of Huaa of Puna; Kahalemilo, son of Imaikalani of Kau; Moihala, son of Hoe-a-Pae of Kona.

Keliʻiokaloa married first Makuwahineapalaka, then Heluʻanuʻu and Hikaʻalani. He died in 1545, having had issue, a son Aliʻi Kukailani and daughter Kaohukiokalani.

== Sources ==
Preceded by Umi-a-Liloa	Aliʻi Aimoku of Hawaiʻi c.1525–c.1545	Succeeded by Keawenuiaumi
