= ʻEhu =

Chief of Kona

- Born: Hawaiʻi
- Spouse: Kapohauola
- Children: ʻEhunuikaimalino
- Parent(s): Kūʻaiwa; Kamanawa

ʻEhu was an ancient Hawaiian nobleman (Aliʻi) and the Chief of Kona (a place on the island of Hawaiʻi).

== Life ==
ʻEhu was most likely born on the island of Hawaiʻi. His parents were the High Chief Kuaiwa of Hawaiʻi and one of his wives, Kamanawa-a-Kalamea. ʻEhu became the ruler of Kona, one part of Hawaiʻi. He married Kapohauola, and their son was ʻEhunuikaimalino. Another wife of ʻEhu was a woman called Kahoʻea (Ka-hoʻea), and they had a son named Kama-ʻiole.

After the death of ʻEhu, his son ʻEhunuikaimalino became the Chief of Kona.

== See also ==
- Kūʻaiwa
- Aliʻi nui of Hawaiʻi
