= Waipiʻo Valley =

Valley on The Big Island, Hawaii

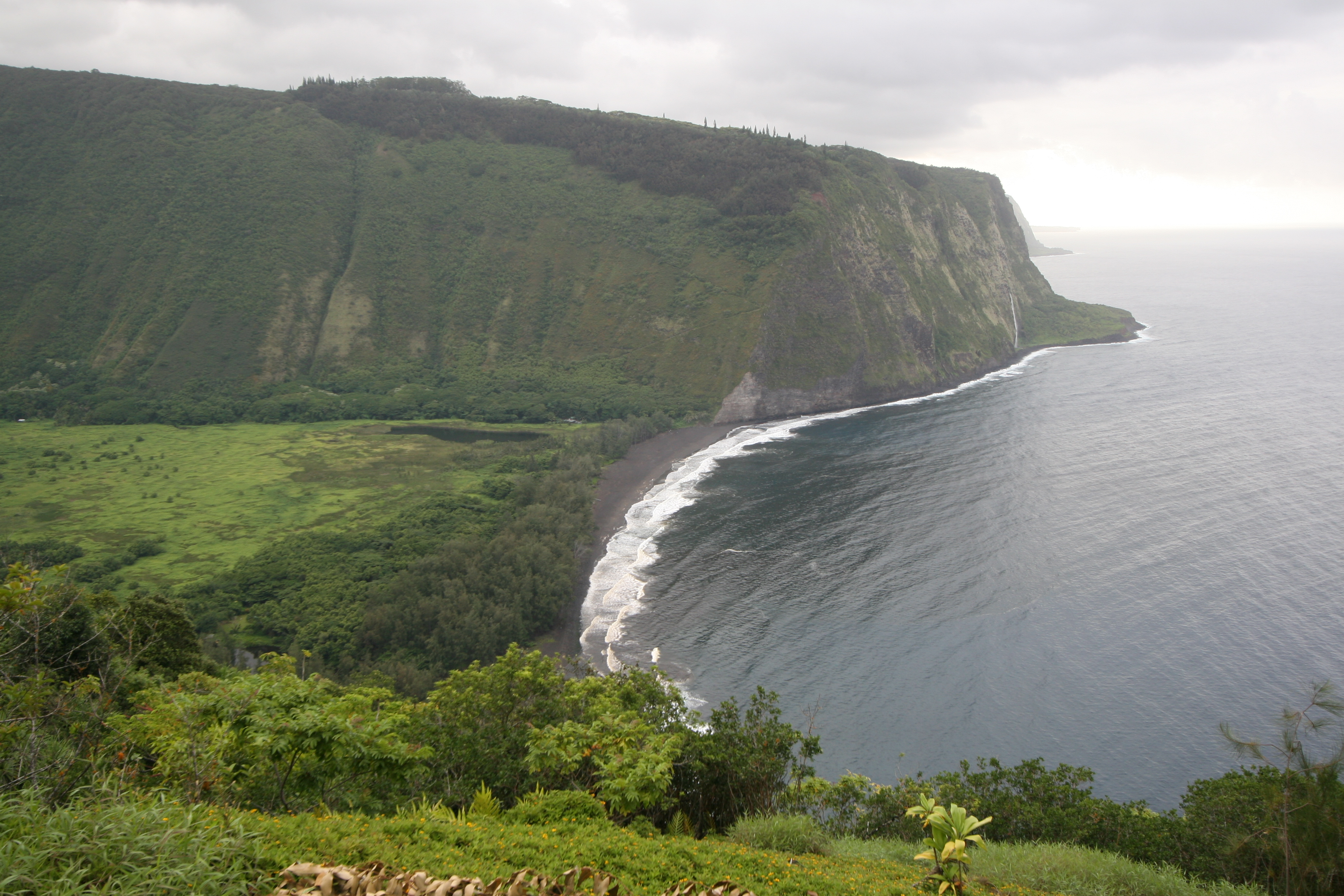
- View from the Waipiʻo Valley lookout.

- Location within Hawaii
- Long-axis direction: Southwest-Northeast

Geography
- Coordinates: 20°07′11″N 155°35′35″W
- Interactive map of Waipiʻo Valley

Waipiʻo Valley is a valley located in the Hāmākua District of the Hawaiʻi Island of Hawaiʻi. Wai piʻo means "curved water" in the Hawaiian language.

== Description ==
The valley floor at sea level is almost 2,000 ft (610 m) below the surrounding terrain. The valley was formed by stream erosion in the weak basalt lava from the Kohala volcano.

The shore line in the valley is a black sand beach, popular with surfers. A few taro farms are located in the valley. Several large waterfalls fall into the valley to feed the river which flows from the foot of the largest falls at the back of the valley out to the ocean.

== History and folklore ==
The valley was the capital and permanent residence of many early Hawaiian aliʻi (chiefs/kings) up until the time of King ʻUmi. This was a place celebrated for its nioi tree (Eugenia reinwardtiana) known as the Nioi wela o Pakaʻalana ("The burning Nioi of Pakaʻalana"). It was the location of the ancient grass palace of the ancient "kings" of Hawaiʻi with the nioi stands. The first chief who had a court in this valley was called Kahaimoelea.

At its peak, the valley likely supported 10,000 people on 800 acres (320 ha) of taro. In the 18th century, Kahekili II (king of Maui) raided Waipiʻo and burned the four sacred trees to the ground.

The valley has a role in local Hawaiian folklore as a place where the gateway to Lua-o-Milu (the Underworld) was hidden from view by sand.

The 2006 Kiholo Bay earthquake, caused a cliff at the entrance of the Waipiʻo Valley to collapse and slide into the ocean as well as rock falls on the access road leading to the valley.

== Access ==
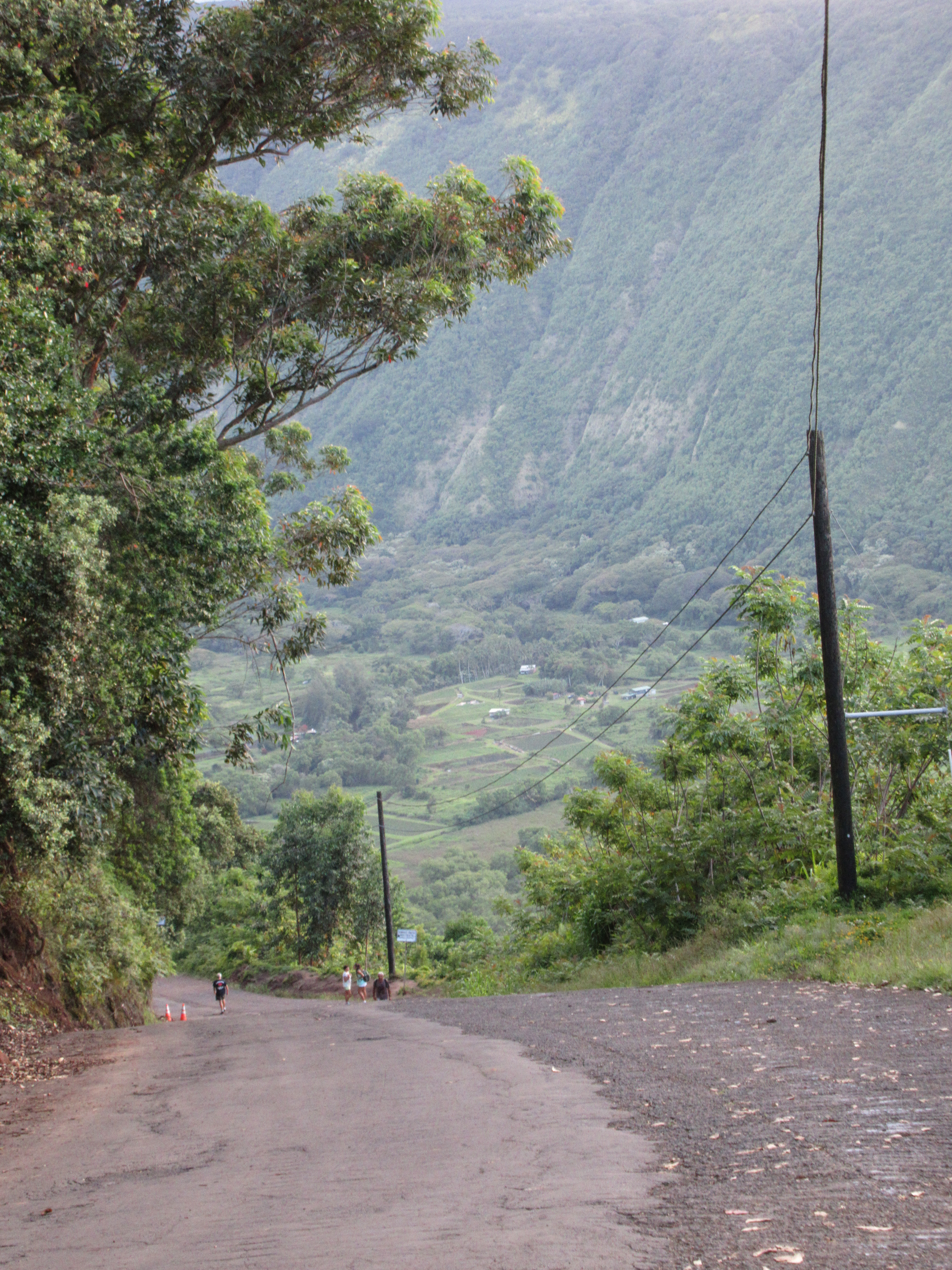
A sliver of the Waipiʻo Valley from the access road, which features a 25% grade.

A steep road leads down into the valley from a lookout point located on the top of the southern wall of the valley. The road rises 800 feet (240 m) in 0.6 miles (1.0 km) at a 25% average grade, with significantly steeper grades in sections. Some portions of the road can reach up to a 45% grade, which would make Waipiʻo Valley Road the steepest in the world, compared to Baldwin Street's 35%. This is a paved public road but it is open only to 4 wheel drive vehicles. It is the steepest road of its length in the United States. The access to the valley floor via the road is allowed for Big Island residents, county-permitted tour company operators and those seeking to practice their Native Hawaiian traditional or customary rights.

A foot trail called Waimanu or Muliwai Trail leads down a steep path to the Waimanu Valley, which is only accessible by the trail or by boat. The trail is accessible to hikers, who need a Waimanu camping permit from the state unless they do the trek as a strenuous day hike. At the upper end of the valley, Waimanu Gap at 2,089 feet (637 m) elevation leads to the south end of Waimanu Valley.

== In popular culture ==
The valley was the site of the final scene in the 1995 sci-fi film Waterworld, at which the main characters found dry land.

== Image gallery ==
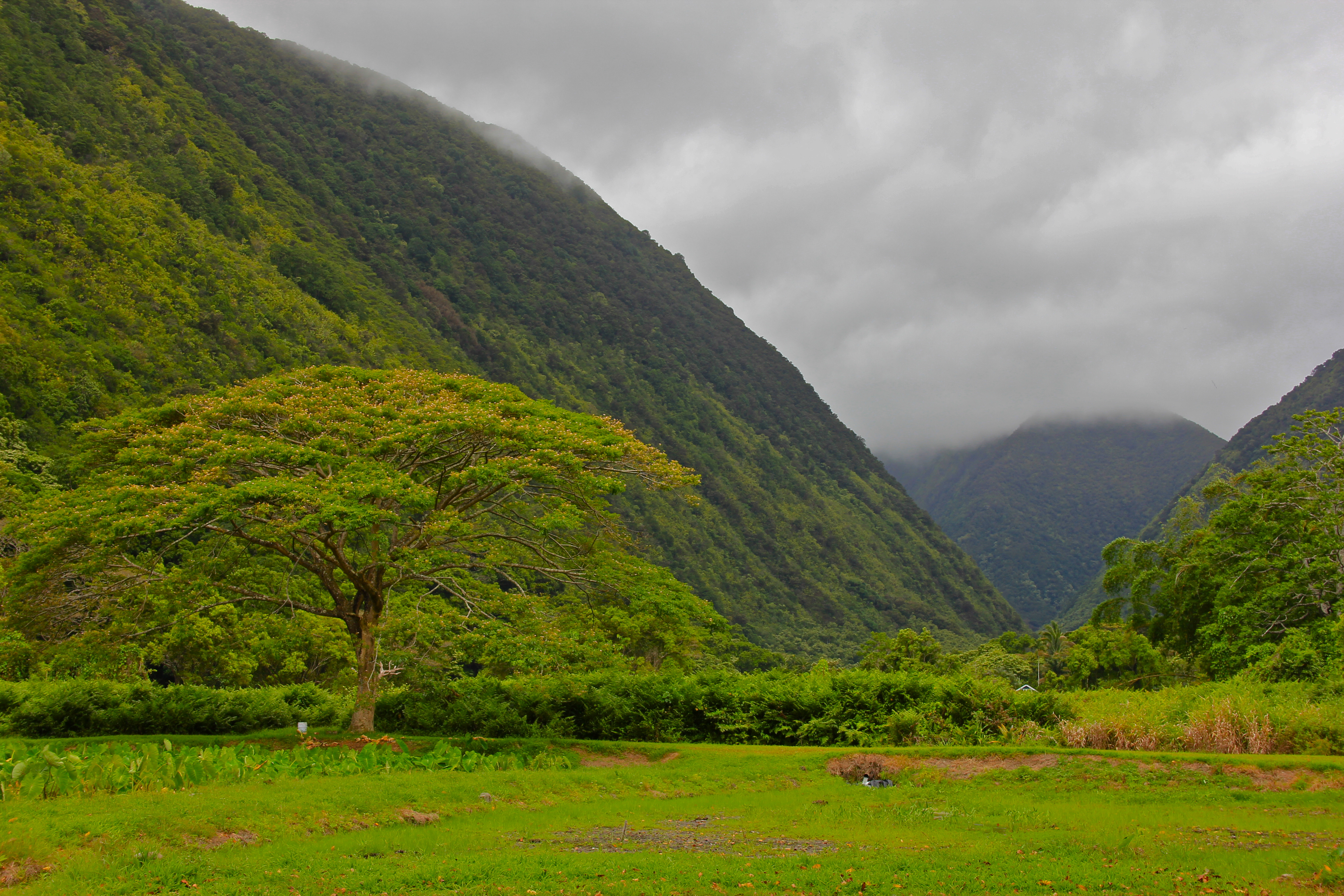
View of the back of Waipiʻo Valley.

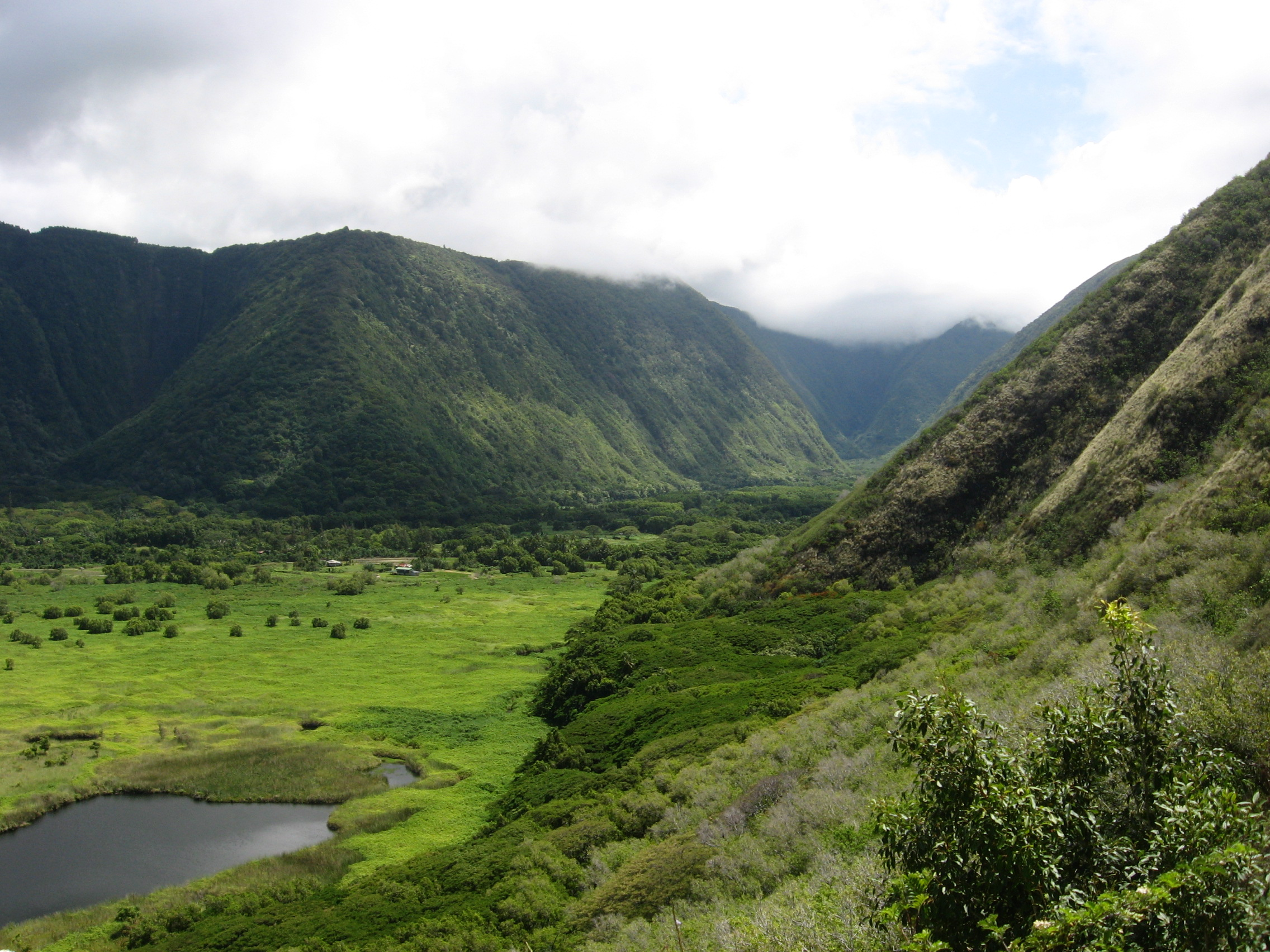
View of the back of Waipiʻo Valley.

Hiʻilawe Waterfall at the back of Waipiʻo Valley.

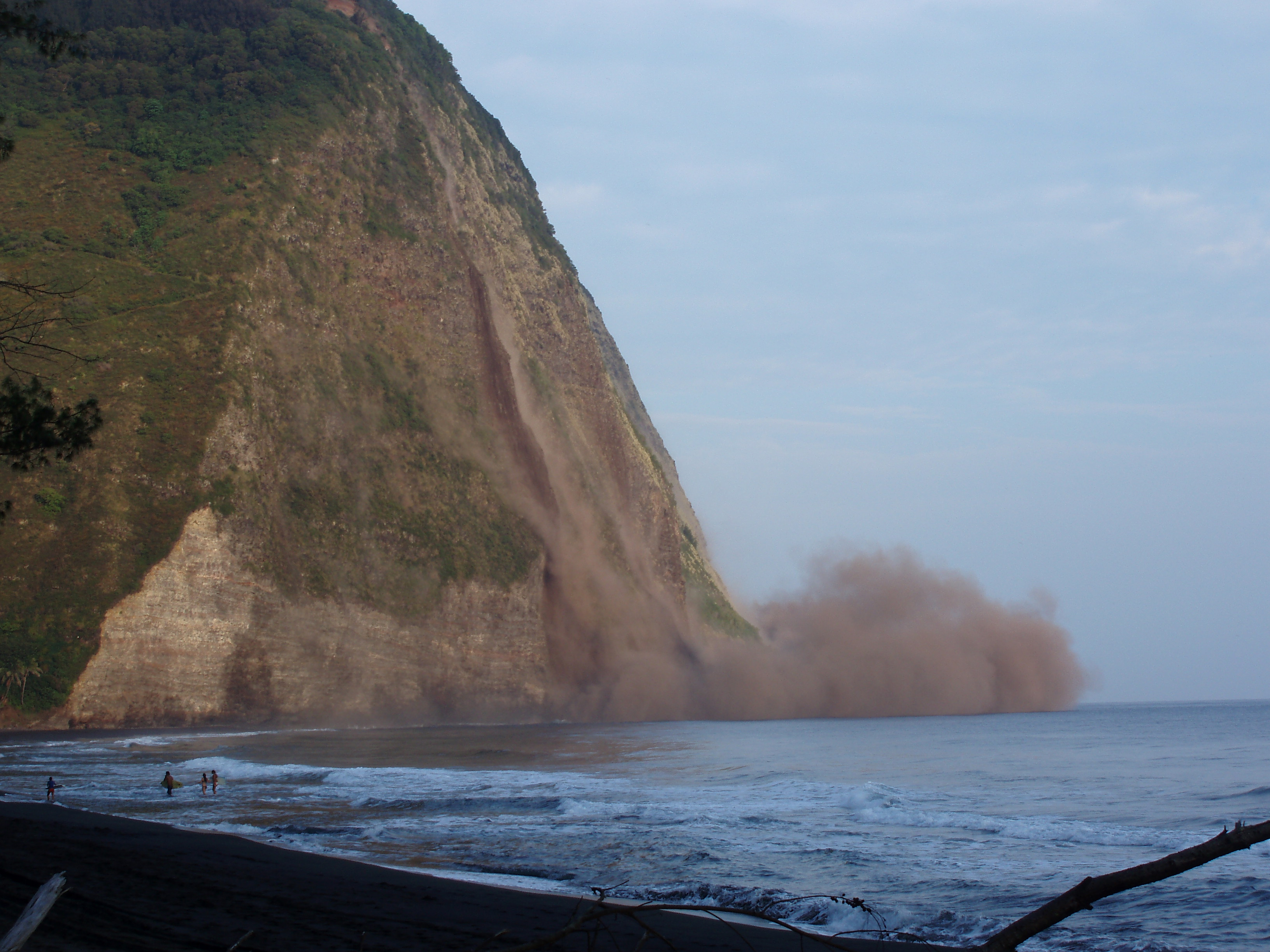
Waipiʻo Valley cliff falling in during the 2006 Kiholo Bay earthquake.
