= Kahekili I =

- Chief of Maui
- Consort: Haukanuimakamaka
- Issue: Kawaokaohele; Keleanohoanaʻapiʻapi
- Father: Kakae
- Mother: Kapohauola
- Religion: Hawaiian religion

Kahekili I was a chief of Maui. Kahekili was a noted warrior chief who was styled Kahekilinui or "Kahekili the Great", even though his greatness was small in comparison to his descendant Kahekili II. His name was short for Kāne-Hekili after the Hawaiian god of thunder.

Kahekili was a son of Kakae and High Chiefess Kapohauola and succeeded his uncle Kakaalaneo as the ruler of Maui. Kahekili was known to have impoverished his people by his many war campaigns.

Kahekili married Haukanuimakamaka or Haukanimaka from Kauai. Kahekili was known to have had two children from her, a son named Kawaokaohele, whose name means "Our-Days-of-Poverty" to commemorate the impoverishment, and a beautiful daughter Keleanohoanaʻapiʻapi. He was succeeded by his son.

| Preceded by Kakaʻalaneo | Aliʻi nui of Maui | Succeeded by Kawaokaohele |
