= Kalanikaumakaowākea =

Kalanikaumakaowākea (or Kalanikaumaka-o-Wākea) was an Aliʻi nui of the island of Maui in ancient Hawaii. He was named after the god called Wākea, who is the Sky father in Hawaiian religion and mythology.

== Family ==
Kalanikaumakaowākea was the son of the Aliʻi Kauhiakama and his wife, Queen Kapukini III (daughter of Chief Makakaualiʻi); however, some accounts have him the piʻo (the sacred child of the siblings) son of Kauhiakama and his sister Piʻilanikapo. He was a member of the Paumakua dynasty.

Kalanikaumakaowākea married a woman named Kekaikuihala (Kaneakaula), whose parents were Chief Kuhinahinau of Kawaihae and his wife Keakahiwaʻakama.

These are the children of Kalanikaumakaowākea and Kekaikuihala:

- Piʻilaniwahine II, mother of Queen Lonomaʻaikanaka
- King Lonohonuakini of Maui, named after Lono
- Kalanikauanakikilani

Kalanikaumakaowākea also had a second wife named Makakuwahine (wahine = "woman"), who was the daughter of Kanelaʻaukahi and Kamaka, of the Keaunui-a-Maweke-Laakona family. With Makaku, Kalanikaumakaowākea had a son named ʻUmi-a-Liloa II. Another son named Kauloaiwi has an unknown mother.
