= Kūʻaiwa =

Hawaiian High Chief

- High Chief of Hawaiʻi
- Wives: Kumuleilani; Kamanawa
- Issue: Kahoukapu ʻEhu
- Father: Kalaunuiohua
- Mother: Kaheka

Kūʻaiwa was a High Chief of Hawaiʻi from 1345 to 1375.

Kūʻaiwa was son of Kalaunuiohua and his wife, Kaheka. Kuaiwa followed his father as sovereign of Hawaiʻi.

Kūʻaiwa had two wives, Kumuleilani and Kamanawa. The former descended from Luaehu; the latter descended from Maweke of the Nanaulu line. Kamanawa's name means "the season". With Kamuleilani, Kuaiwa had three children, Kahoukapu, Hukulani, and Manauea, and with Kamanawa, Kuaiwa had son, ʻEhu, all of whom became heads of aristocratic families.

Preceded by Kalaunuiohua	High Chief of Hawai‘i	Succeeded by Kahoukapu
