= Līloa =

Hawaiian royal

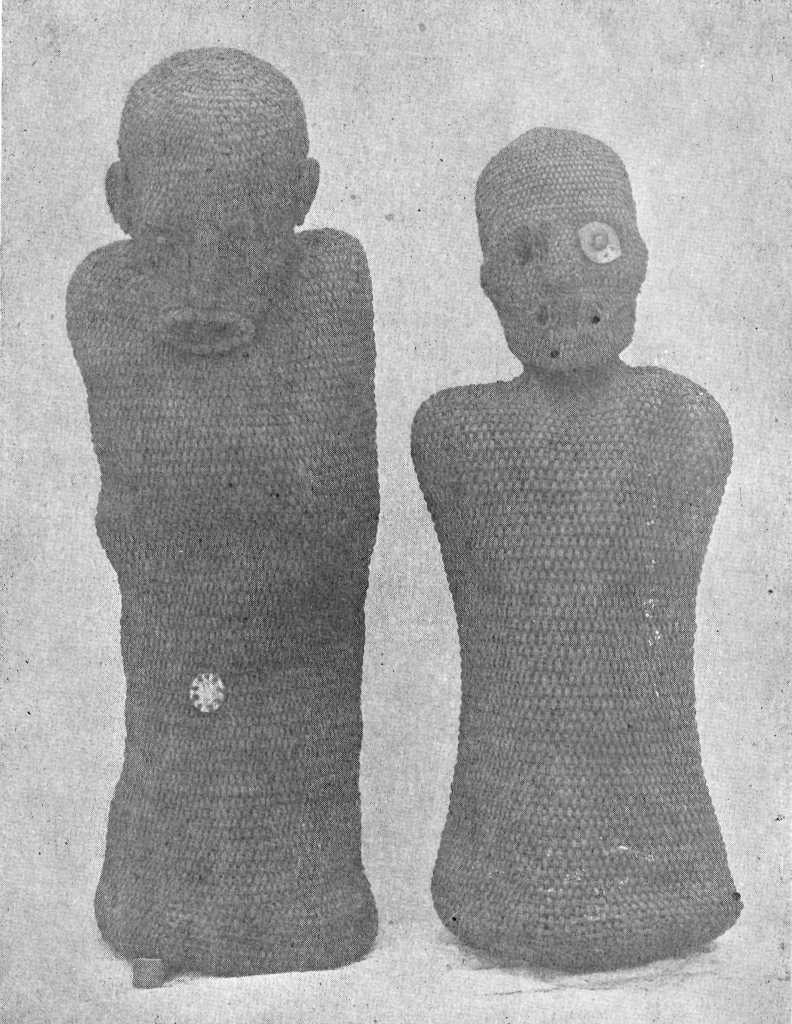
Coir-braided caskets—said to be of Kings Liloa (left) and Lonoikamakahiki

Līloa was a ruler of the island of Hawaii in the late 15th century. He kept his royal compound in Waipi'o Valley.

Līloa was the firstborn son of Kiha-nui-lulu-moku, one of the noho aliʻi (ruling elite). He descended from Hāna-laʻa-nui. Līloa's mother Waioloa (or Waoilea), his grandmother Neʻula, and his great-grandmother Laʻa-kapu were of the ʻEwa aliʻi lines of Oahu. Liloa's father ruled Hawaii as aliʻi nui and upon his death left the rule of the island to Līloa. Kiha had four other sons, brothers to Līloa. Their names were Kaunuamoa, Makaoku, Kepailiula, and (by Kiha's second wife Hina-opio) Hoolana. Hoolana's descendants were the Kaiakea family of Molokai, from whom Abraham Fornander's wife Pinao Alanakapu was descended.

Līloa had two sons: his firstborn, Hākau, from his wife Pinea (his mother's sister); and his second son, ʻUmi-a-Līloa, from his lesser-ranking wife, Akahi-a-Kuleana.

Līloa was the common progenitor of royal dynasties from whom many of the pre- and post-unification ruling ali'i derived their genealogy and mana: all of the kings and queens of the Kingdom of Hawaii could point to him as their ancestor and source of paramountcy.

Hawaiian activist Kanalu G. Terry Young has claimed that the practice of moe aikāne (a type of sexual relationship, frequently homosexual, between members of the aliʻi classes) originated with Līloa.

== Līloa's kāʻei ==
During the reign of King Kalākaua Līloa's kāʻei, or royal sash, became part of the regalia associated with the crown jewels: the possession of this sash lent legitimacy to the elected King, by way of association with the ancestor's military prowess and divine power. "Kalākaua valued the sash as a symbol of his inherited kapu status and the legitimacy of his royal accession. The feather cordon was a rightful possession of the reigning king of Hawai‘i even in the late nineteenth century."

Today, Līloa's kāʻei is one of the Hawaiian crown jewels in the collection of the Bishop Museum in Honolulu.
