= ʻUmi-a-Līloa =

Supreme ruler of the Hawaiian Islands (c.1490–c.1525)

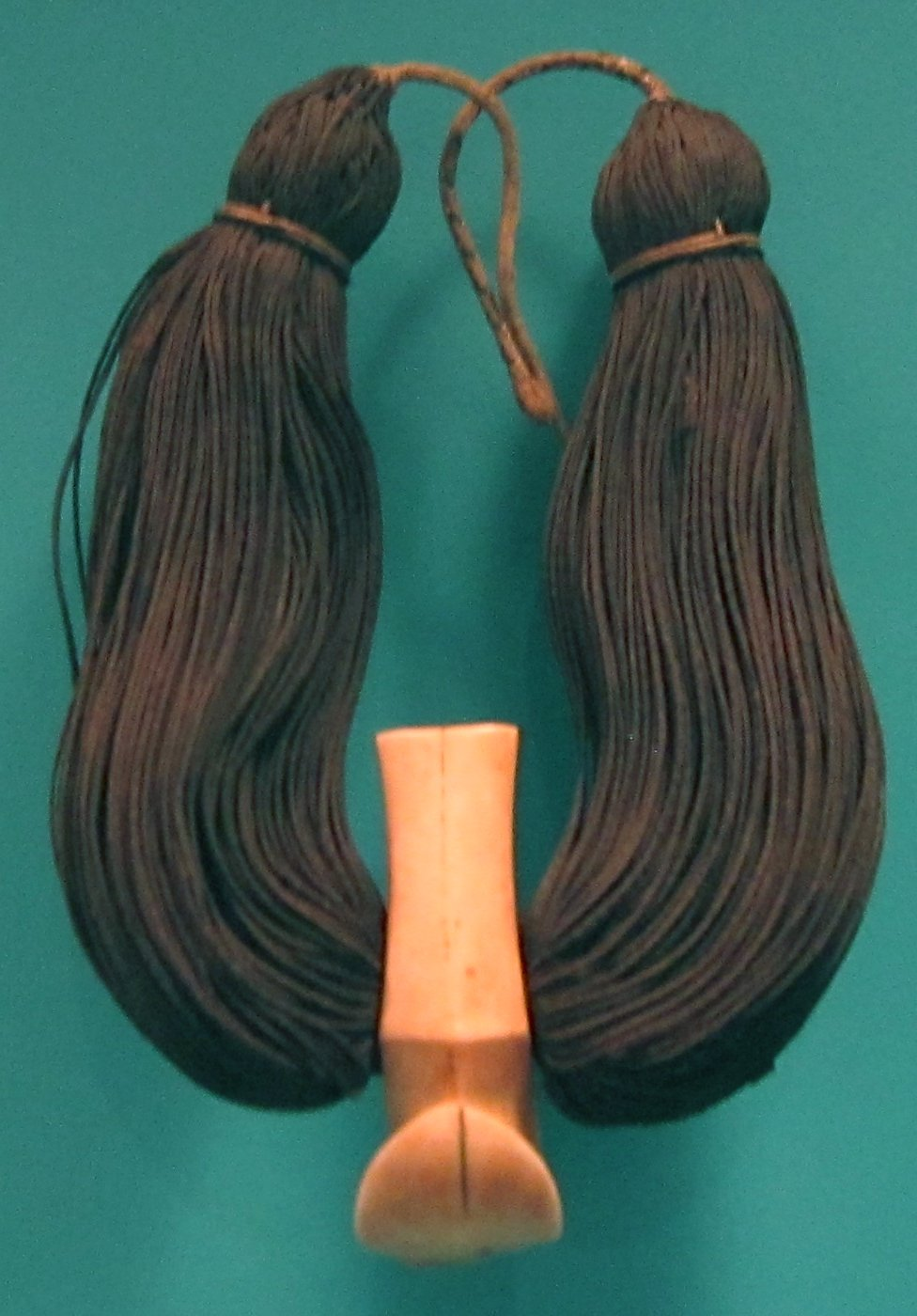
Umi was given a number of royal tokens to prove he was the son of Liloa, including a lei niho palaoa. The lei (necklace) was made of braided human hair and whale bone.

ʻUmi-a-Līloa (sixteenth century) was the supreme ruler Aliʻi-ʻAimoku (High chief of Hawaiʻi Island) who inherited religious authority of the Hawaiian Islands from his father, High Chief Līloa, whose line is traced, unbroken to Hawaiian "creation". Aliʻi-ʻAimoku is the title bestowed on the ruler of a moku, district or island. His mother was Akahi. She was of a lesser line of chiefs who Līloa had fallen in love with when he discovered her bathing in a river. He became Aliʻi nui after the death of his half-brother Hākau, who inherited the lands of his father to rule. ʻUmi-a-Līloa was considered a just ruler, religious and the first to unite almost all of the island of Hawaii. The legend of Umi is one of the most popular hero sagas in Hawaiian history. While there is probably embellishment to the story, as many sagas do, a portion of historical accuracy remains.

ʻUmi-a-Līloaʻs wife was Princess Piʻikea, daughter of Piʻilani, Aliʻi-ʻAimoku of Maui. Piʻikea and ʻUmi were the parents of son Kumalae and daughter Aihākōkō.

== Birth and early life ==
His father was High Chief Liloa, and his mother, Akahiakuleana (Akahi). Each were married to another. The couple met when Liloa, the then ali'i-ai-moku of Hawaii was visiting the local area of Hamakua. He met Akahi there and claimed his right to her as King and she accepted. After they had consummated, Liloa told her that, if she was to have a male child, she should present the boy to him along with royal tokens he gave to her as gifts, to prove her boy was the son of the king. Akahi hid the gifts given to her by Liloa from her husband and later gave birth to a son. At the age of 15 or 16, his step father was punishing the boy when his mother intervened and told the man he could not touch him because the boy was his lord and chief. She recovered the hidden tokens of royal sovereignty to present to her husband to prove the high treason he would have committed. Akahi gave her son the gifts of the royal malo and lei niho palaoa which were given to her by his true father, that only the high chiefs wore, and sent Umi to Waipio to present himself to the king as his son.

Liloa's palace was well guarded and attended by several Kahuna. The entire enclosure was sacred and a penalty of death stood for breaching its walls. Umi entered the walled off enclosure with attendants afraid to stop someone wearing the royal insignia and walked straight to Liloa's sleeping quarters, waking the king. When Liloa asked who he was, he said "It is I, Umi your son". He then placed the tokens at his fathers feet and was proclaimed son by King Liloa. After learning of Umi, Hākau became upset and demanded answers from his father, who assured his first born that he would be king after his death and his brother would serve him. Umi was brought to court on an equal footing with his half brother Hākau, who was the son of Liloa with his first wife, Pinea from an ali'i family of equal rank to that of her husband. Living within Liloa's court alongside his brother, Umi found great favor from his father, only increasing Hākau's dislike of his half brother.

== Death of Liloa, rise of Hākau ==
Liloa died and his kingdom passed to his first born son, Hākau, as promised. At first he was a decent king, but soon he became brutal. To avoid his brother's anger, Umi exiled himself to another district. There he took wives and began amassing forces and followers. Chiefs began to believe him to be of the highest chiefly nature from signs they saw. He gave food to people and became known for caring for everyone. In contrast, Hākau refused to attend to his father's two favorite kahuna, who were now ailing and requesting food after an illness. He refused them food in an insulting manner. Nunu and Ka-hohe were of the priestly class of Lono. They resented their treatment and plotted to see the kingdom in someone else's hand. Hākau did not believe the priest to have any strength or power. Because Umi had been given spiritual authority, he disrespected the priests. This was a period in Hawaiian history when no king could successfully defy a kahuna. Many had a royal bloodline, land and could leave their temples as warriors when needed but could never give up their spiritual responsibilities. Through a messenger of Kaoleioku, of Waipunalei, the high-priest of the temple of Manini, at Koholalele the two priests made contact with Umi's court and traveled to Waipunalei where they joined Umi's revolt.

== Assassination of Hākau, unification under Umi ==
When Hākau received news that his brother was preparing to war against him, he sent his main forces out to immediately prepare by seeking feathers to adorn their war regalia. After the men had left and Hākau was undefended, Umi's men came forward with a deception that they were there with bundles of offerings for the king. When the bundles were dropped to the ground they were filled with stones and rocks with which the men stoned Hākau to death.

After the death of Hākau the other Ali'i (nobles) of the island claimed their districts for themselves. Umi took the advice of the two priest that assisted him by marrying many woman of high noble rank, including his half sister Kapukini and the daughter of the ruler of Hilo, where he had been given sanctuary during Hākau's reign. Eventually Umi would go to battle with all and conquer the entire island.

Umi unifies the island of Hawaii under his control. He is faithful to those that had supported him and allows his three most faithful companions and the two Kahuna that had aided him, to help govern his lands.

Preceded by Hākau	Ali’i Aimoku of Hawai’i c.1490–c.1525	Succeeded by Keliʻiokaloa
