= Piʻikea =

- Chiefess of Maui
- Spouse: ʻUmi-a-Liloa
- Issue: Kumalae
- Father: Piʻilani
- Mother: La’ieloheloheikawai
- Religion: Hawaiian religion

Piʻikea (Hawaiian: piʻi = "to ascend", ke = "the", ea = "life"; "the life ascends") was a High Chiefess. She was a daughter of Piʻilani and Chiefess La’ieloheloheikawai and sister of Lono-a-Piʻilani and Kiha-a-Piʻilani. Piʻilani built a great temple; according to the myth, Piʻilani was a son of Kū.

Piʻikea went to Hawaiʻi and married ʻUmi-a-Liloa. Their son was Kumalae. They also had a daughter, Aihākōkō.

When Kiha had to flee from Maui, he sought refuge with Piʻikea, at the court of ʻUmi. Here his sister advocated his cause so warmly, and insisted with ʻUmi so urgently, that the latter was induced to espouse the cause of the younger brother against the older, and prepared an expedition to invade Maui, depose Lono, and raise Kiha-a-Piʻilani to the throne of his father. ʻUmi summoned the chiefs of the various districts of Hawaii to prepare for the invasion of Maui. When all the preparations were ready, ʻUmi headed the expedition in person, accompanied by his wife and her brother and by his bravest warriors. Crossing the waters of ʻAlenuihāhā Channel between Maui and Hawaiʻi, the fleet of ʻUmi effected a landing at Kapueokahi, the harbour of Hāna, Maui, where Lono had continued to reside after Piilani's death.

Having failed to prevent the landing of ʻUmi's forces, Lono retired to the fortress on the top of the neighbouring hill called Kauwiki. ʻUmi laid siege to the fort of Kauwiki, and, after some delay and several unsuccessful attempts, finally captured the fort, and Lono having fallen in the battle, Kiha-a-Piʻilani was proclaimed and acknowledged as a king. Having accomplished this, ʻUmi and his forces returned to Hawaiʻi.
