= Aliʻi nui of Maui =

Royalty of Maui, Hawaii

The Aliʻi nui of Maui was the supreme ruler of the islands of Maui, one of the four main Hawaiian Islands as well as the smaller island of Lanai. The title is the same as that of the Aliʻi nui of the other islands. The title or phrase Mōʻī is sometimes used for the title of the monarchs of Maui; however, it is not an ancient word in the Hawaiian language and has origins in the mid 19th century. The only monarchs to officially hold the title of Mōʻī are Kalākaua and his sister Liliʻuokalani.

== Overview ==
The monarchs of Maui, like those of the other Hawaiian islands, claim descent from Wākea and Papa. They were sometimes referred to as Mōʻī beginning in the mid 19th century, and would later become commonly translated from the Hawaiian language into English as the word "king". Paumakua, the first ruler of Maui, was thirty-first in line of descent from Wakea. In the beginning, from about Paumakua of Maui down to Kawaokaohele's reign, the Aliʻi nui of Maui only controlled the much larger western portion of the island while the chiefs of Hana remained independent. Mauiloa had tried to unite the island once, but troubles with the Hana chief continued. It was under Piʻilani's reign that he conquered the east and united Maui for the first time.

Kahekili II expanded his empire by conquering the neighbouring island of Oʻahu in 1783 and through marriage of his brother allied himself with the Queen of Kauaʻi. However, his son Kalanikūpule was the last of his line. Maui was weakened when Kalanikupule and his uncle, Kaeokulani, fought over the succession to the throne. Maui along with Oʻahu fell to Kamehameha I in 1795 and ushered in the Kingdom of Hawaii.

== Aliʻi nui of Maui ==
- Aliʻi nui Piʻilani
- Aliʻi nui Lono-a-Piʻilani
- Aliʻi nui Kiha-a-Piʻilani
- Aliʻi nui Kamalālāwalu
- Aliʻi nui Kauhiakama
- Aliʻi nui Kalanikaumakaowākea
- Aliʻi nui Lonohonuakini 17th century
- Aliʻi nui Kaulahea II
- Aliʻi nui Kekaulike 1700s–1736
- Aliʻi nui Kamehamehanui Aiʻlūʻau 1736–1765
- Aliʻi nui Kahekili II 1765–1794
- Aliʻi nui Kaeokulani 1794
- Aliʻi nui Kalanikūpule of Maui and Oahu 1794–1795
- Aliʻi nui Halama of Maui and Oahu -----1799
- Incorporated into Kamehameha I's kingdom

== Hāna ==
During the early years of the Kingdom of Maui the island was divided in half. The much larger western side was under the rule of the descendants of Paumakua, and East Maui, comprising the districts of Koʻolau, Hāna, Kīpahulu, and Kaupo, was at times under independent rulers. The monarchs of Hāna, like those of the other Hawaiian chiefdom, probably claimed descent from Wakea and Pāpa. These monarchs were in some sense district chiefs and vassals of the Western rulers of Maui. From Eleio to Hoolae the aliʻi of Hāna remained mostly free from West Maui under Kakaalaneo to Kawaokaohele. The sixth Aliʻi Nui of Hāna, Hoolae, became a subject of Piʻilani and even allowed his daughter to marry Piʻilani's son Kiha-a-Piʻilani. The aliʻi of Hāna's allegiance to the West Maui Mōʻī were always precarious, even in later times after Piʻilani's conquest. The main strategic advantage of the aliʻi of Hāna was their command of the fortress of Kauwiki, considered impregnable.

=== Hāna chiefs ===
- Aliʻi nui Eleio of Hāna during the reign of Kakaalaneo
- Aliʻi nui Kalahaeha of Hāna
- Aliʻi nui Lei of Hāna
- Aliʻi nui Kamohohalii of Hāna
- Aliʻi nui Kalaehina of Hāna
- Aliʻi nui Hoolae of Hāna

== See also ==
- History of Maui
- Ancient Hawaii
- Hawaiian Kingdom
- Aliʻi nui of Kauai
- Aliʻi nui of Molokai
- Aliʻi nui of Hawaii
- Aliʻi nui of Oahu
- Governors of Maui
- Maui County, Hawaii
