= Nuʻakea =

Ancient Hawaiian Chiefess of Oahu & Queen of Moloka'i

- High Chiefess of Oʻahu and Molokaʻi
- Born: Oʻahu, Hawaiʻi (Hawaii)
- Family: Royal family of ʻEwa
- Consort: Chief Keʻoloʻewa-a-Kamauaua
- Issue: Kapau-a-Nuʻakea
- Father: High Chief Keaunui of ʻEwa
- Mother: High Chiefess Wehelani

Nuʻakea was a High Chiefess in Ancient Hawaii, who was a Princess of Oʻahu island by birth and became Queen of Molokaʻi, another Hawaiian island.

She is mentioned in Hawaiian legends and by historian Abraham Fornander.

== Biography ==
Nuʻakea was born on the island of Oʻahu to the High Chief Keaunui of ʻEwa and his wife, High Chiefess Wehelani and was named after the goddess of lactation. She was a granddaughter of famous chief Maweke, a royal chief of blue blood and legendary ancestor of sacred chiefs.

Brothers of Nuʻakea were King Laʻakona of ʻEwa and prophet Moʻi and her cousin was King Kumuhonua.

She went on Molokaʻi and married Keʻoloʻewa-a-Kamauaua. He was the second known lord of the island. Her parents-in-law were King Kamauʻaʻua and Hinakeha and her brother-in-law was the famous Prince Kaupeʻepeʻe-nui-kauila. Moʻi was a friend of that prince.

The only known child of Nuʻakea and her husband was Queen regnant Kapau-a-Nuʻakea, named after her mother. She ruled after her father had died.

Nuʻakea was a grandmother of Queen Kamauliwahine and ancestor of Prince Kalahumoku I of Hana.

== Family tree ==
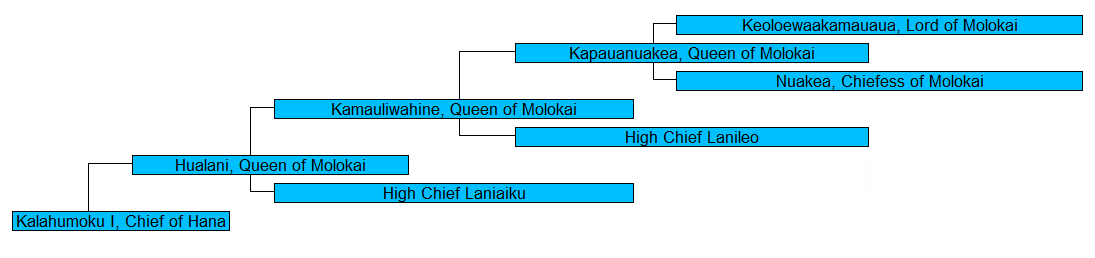

== See also ==
- Ewaulialaakona, nephew of Nuʻakea
- Hualani, descendant of Nuʻakea

Preceded by Hinakeha	Consort of Molokaʻi	Succeeded by Lanileo
