= Malamaʻihanaʻae =

- Occupation: Chiefess of Hawaiʻi
- Spouse(s): Kalapana of Hawaiʻi; Haunaʻakamahala
- Children: Kahaʻimaoeleʻa of Hawaiʻi; Kapo-a-Kauluhailea of Hawaiʻi
- Parent(s): Piʻikalani; Kalamea I

Malamaʻihanaʻae (also known as Makeʻamalamaʻihanai) was a Hawaiian noble lady and a High Chiefess of the Big Island — island of Hawaii. She was a close relative and the wife of the High Chief Kalapana.

== Biography ==
Malamaʻihanaʻae was most likely born on the Big Island. Her parents were a man called Piʻikalani (kalani = "heavenly") and his consort, Kalamea I (Kalama) — a relative of the High Chief Kanipahu of Hawaiʻi. The son of Kanipahu was Kanaloa, who was likely the father of Kalapana, Chief of the Big Island.

Kanipahu was forced to escape to Molokai, and the usurper called Kamaiole became the new ruler of the island. Malamaʻihanaʻae married Kalapana, who ruled over the island after the murder of Kamaiole. Kalapana and Malamaʻihanaʻae had a son named Kahaʻimaoeleʻa (Kahai IV). After Kalapana died in ca. 1285, Kahaʻimaoeleʻa became the chief of the island.

The second husband of Malamaʻihanaʻae was Haunaʻakamahala, who was a priest, and he ordered the construction of a heiau (temple). Their daughter was Lady Kapo-a-Kauluhailea, who married her half-brother Kahai and became the mother of the great Kalaunuiohua.

It is unknown when did Malamaʻihanaʻae die. Her son's royal court was located in Waipio Valley.
