= Kalanipehu =

- King of Molokai
- Consort: Unknown
- Issue: Princess Kumakakaha
- Religion: Hawaiian religion

Kalanipehu (Hawaiian language: kalani = "heavenly") was a High Chief on the Hawaiian island of Molokai in the 17th century. His name is known from ancient chants.

== Biography ==
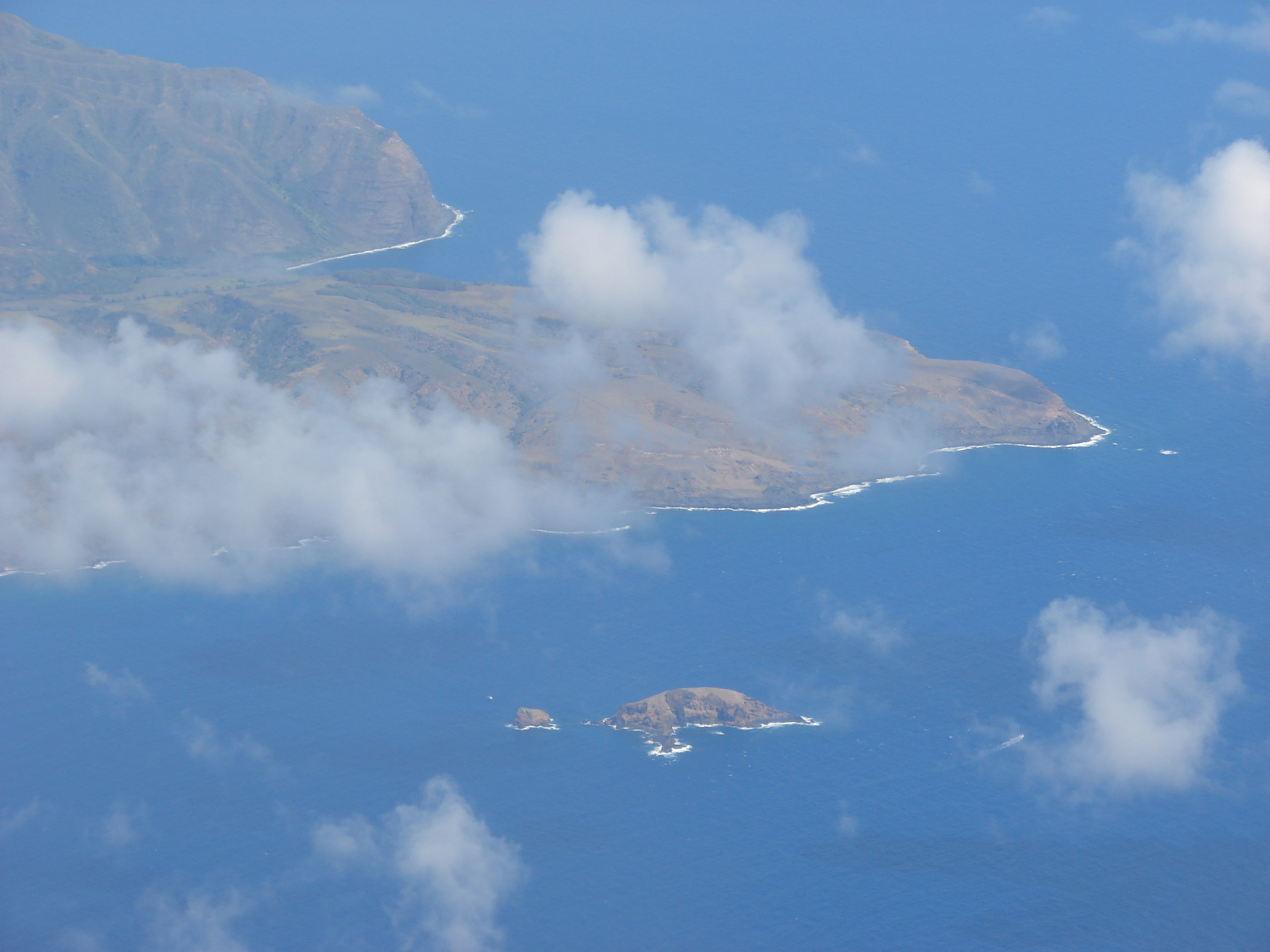
Molokai seen from the air.

Kalanipehu was the most powerful chief of Molokaʻi in the beginning of the 17th century. His parents are not known.

Before his reign, this island had been ruled by his ancestors, who were descendants of Chief Keʻoloʻewa-a-Kamauaua and Chiefess Nuakea.

The scholar Abraham Fornander implied that he was a descendant of Kamauaua, but it is not clear through whom.

Kalanipehu's daughter Kumakakaha married Kuikai, the chief of Puna who had moved to Molokaʻi. He was closely related to the ruling chiefs or Aliʻi of Hawaiʻi.

Kumakakaha and Kuikai became the ancestors of the Kaiakea family.

At the end of the 17th and in the early 18th century, the independence and autonomy of the island of Molokaʻi were destroyed.
