= List of mountain peaks of Hawaii =

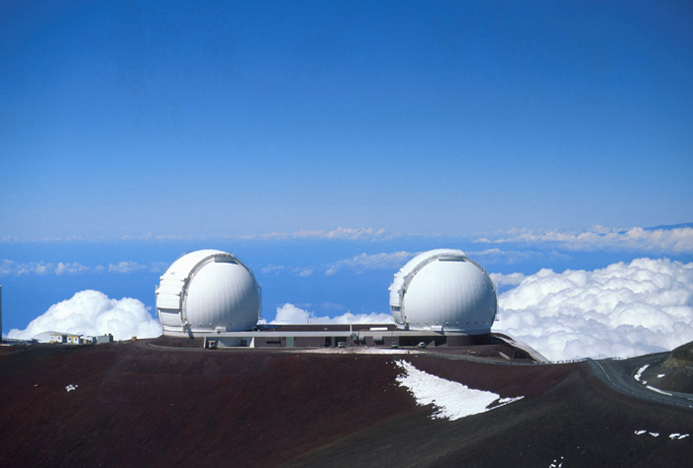
Mauna Kea on the Island of Hawaiʻi is the highest peak in the U.S. State of Hawaiʻi and the entire Pacific Ocean.

The Hawaiian Islands has 13 major mountain peaks (Note: This article defines a significant summit as a summit with at least 100 meters (328.1 feet) of topographic prominence, and a major summit as a summit with at least 500 meters (1640 feet) of topographic prominence. An ultra-prominent summit is a summit with at least 1500 meters (4921 feet) of topographic prominence.) with at least 500 meters (1640 feet) of topographic prominence.

The summit of a mountain or hill may be measured in three principal ways:

1. The topographic elevation of a summit measures the height of the summit above a geodetic sea level. The first table below ranks the 13 major summits of Hawaiʻi by topographic elevation.
2. The topographic prominence of a summit is a measure of how high the summit rises above its surroundings. The second table below ranks the 13 major summits of Hawaiʻi by topographic prominence.
3. The topographic isolation (or radius of dominance) of a summit measures how far the summit lies from its nearest point of equal elevation. The third table below ranks the 13 major summits of Hawaiʻi by topographic isolation.

== Highest major summits ==
13 major summits of Hawaii

Of the 13 major summits of Hawaiʻi, Mauna Kea and Mauna Loa exceed 4000 meters (13,123 feet) elevation, Haleakalā exceeds 3000 meters (9843 feet), Hualalai exceeds 2000 meters (6562 feet), and 11 peaks exceed 1000 meters (3281 feet) elevation.

Four of these peaks rise on the island of Hawaiʻi, two on Maui, two on Kauaʻi, two on Molokaʻi, two on Oʻahu, and one on Lānaʻi.

Of the 13 major summits of Hawaiʻi, Mauna Kea exceeds 4000 meters (13,123 feet) of topographic prominence, Haleakalā exceeds 3000 meters (9843 feet), Mauna Loa exceeds 2000 meters (6562 feet), six peaks are ultra-prominent summits with more than 1500 meters (4921 feet), and eight peaks exceed 1000 meters (3281 feet) of topographic prominence.

Of the 13 major summits of Hawaiʻi, Mauna Kea has 3947 kilometers (2453 miles) of topographic isolation and four peaks exceed 100 kilometers (62.14 miles) of topographic isolation.

The 13 highest summits of Hawaiʻi with at least 500 meters of topographic prominence
Rank	Mountain peak	Island	Elevation	Prominence	Isolation	Location
1	Mauna Kea (Note: The summit of Mauna Kea is the highest point of the island of Hawaiʻi, the U.S. State of Hawaiʻi, and all islands of the Pacific Ocean.) (Note: Mauna Kea is the tallest mountain on Earth as measured from base to summit. The shield volcano sits on the ocean floor at a depth of 5998 meters (19,678 feet) for a total height of 10,205.3 meters (33,482 feet).)	Island of Hawaiʻi	13,803 ft 4207.3 m	13,803 ft 4207 m	2,453 mi 3,947 km	19.8207°N 155.4681°W
2	Mauna Loa (Note: Mauna Loa is the southernmost and westernmost 4000-meter (13,123-foot) summit of Hawaiʻi and the United States.) (Note: The shield volcano Mauna Loa is the second most voluminous mountain on Earth with an estimated volume of 74,000 cubic kilometres (18,000 cu mi), or enough material to fill the Grand Canyon more than 18 times)	Island of Hawaiʻi	13,679 ft 4169 m	7,099 ft 2164 m	25.4 mi 40.8 km	19.4756°N 155.6054°W
3	Haleakalā (Note: The summit of Haleakalā is the highest point of the island of Maui and the westernmost 3000 meter (9842.5-foot) summit of the United States.)	Island of Maui	10,023 ft 3055 m	10,023 ft 3055 m	76.3 mi 122.9 km	20.7097°N 156.2533°W
4	Hualālai	Island of Hawaiʻi	8,271 ft 2521 m	3,091 ft 942 m	22.4 mi 36 km	19.6889°N 155.8644°W
5	Puʻu Kukui	Island of Maui	5,788 ft 1764 m	5,678 ft 1731 m	23.5 mi 37.9 km	20.8904°N 156.5863°W
6	Kaunu o Kaleihoohie	Island of Hawaiʻi	5,500 ft 1676 m	2,600 ft 792 m	16.8 mi 27 km	20.0860°N 155.7171°W
7	Kawaikini (Note: The summit of Kawaikini is the highest point of the island of Kauaʻi.)	Island of Kauaʻi	5,243 ft 1598 m	5,243 ft 1598 m	204 mi 328 km	22.0586°N 159.4973°W
8	Kamakou (Note: The summit of Kamakou is the highest point of the island of Molokaʻi.)	Island of Molokaʻi	4,961 ft 1512 m	4,961 ft 1512 m	23.5 mi 37.8 km	21.1065°N 156.8682°W
9	Olokuʻi	Island of Molokaʻi	4,606 ft 1404 m	1,949 ft 594 m	2.15 mi 3.46 km	21.1325°N 156.8498°W
10	Kaʻala (Note: The summit of Kaʻala is the highest point of the island of Oʻahu.)	Island of Oʻahu	4,060 ft 1237 m	4,060 ft 1237 m	84.4 mi 135.8 km	21.5079°N 158.1426°W
11	Lānaʻihale (Note: The summit of Lānaʻihale is the highest point of the island of Lānaʻi.)	Island of Lānaʻi	3,396 ft 1035 m	3,396 ft 1035 m	19.32 mi 31.1 km	20.8122°N 156.8732°W
12	Kōnāhuanui	Island of Oʻahu	3,150 ft 960 m	2,303 ft 702 m	23.9 mi 38.5 km	21.3580°N 157.7882°W
13	Hāʻupu	Island of Kauaʻi	2,297 ft 700 m	1,687 ft 514 m	11.02 mi 17.74 km	21.9254°N 159.4018°W

== Gallery ==
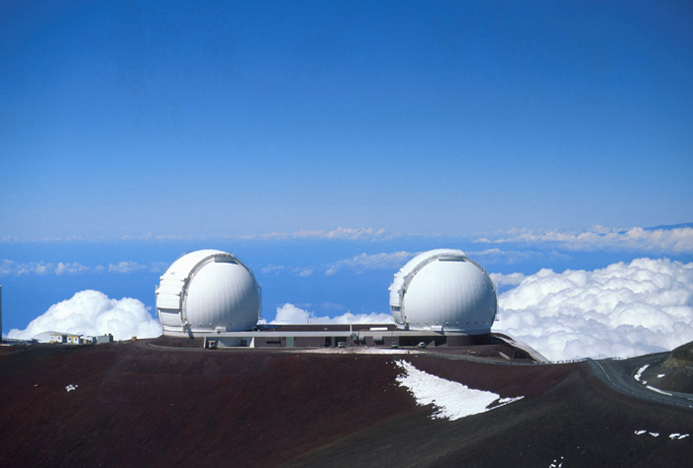
Mauna Kea on the Island of Hawaiʻi is the tallest mountain on Earth as measured from base to summit.

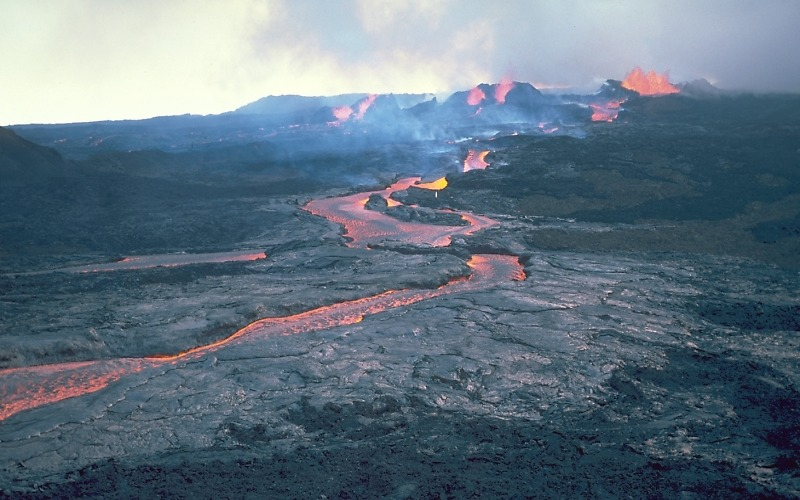
Mauna Loa on the Island of Hawaiʻi is the second most voluminous mountain on Earth.

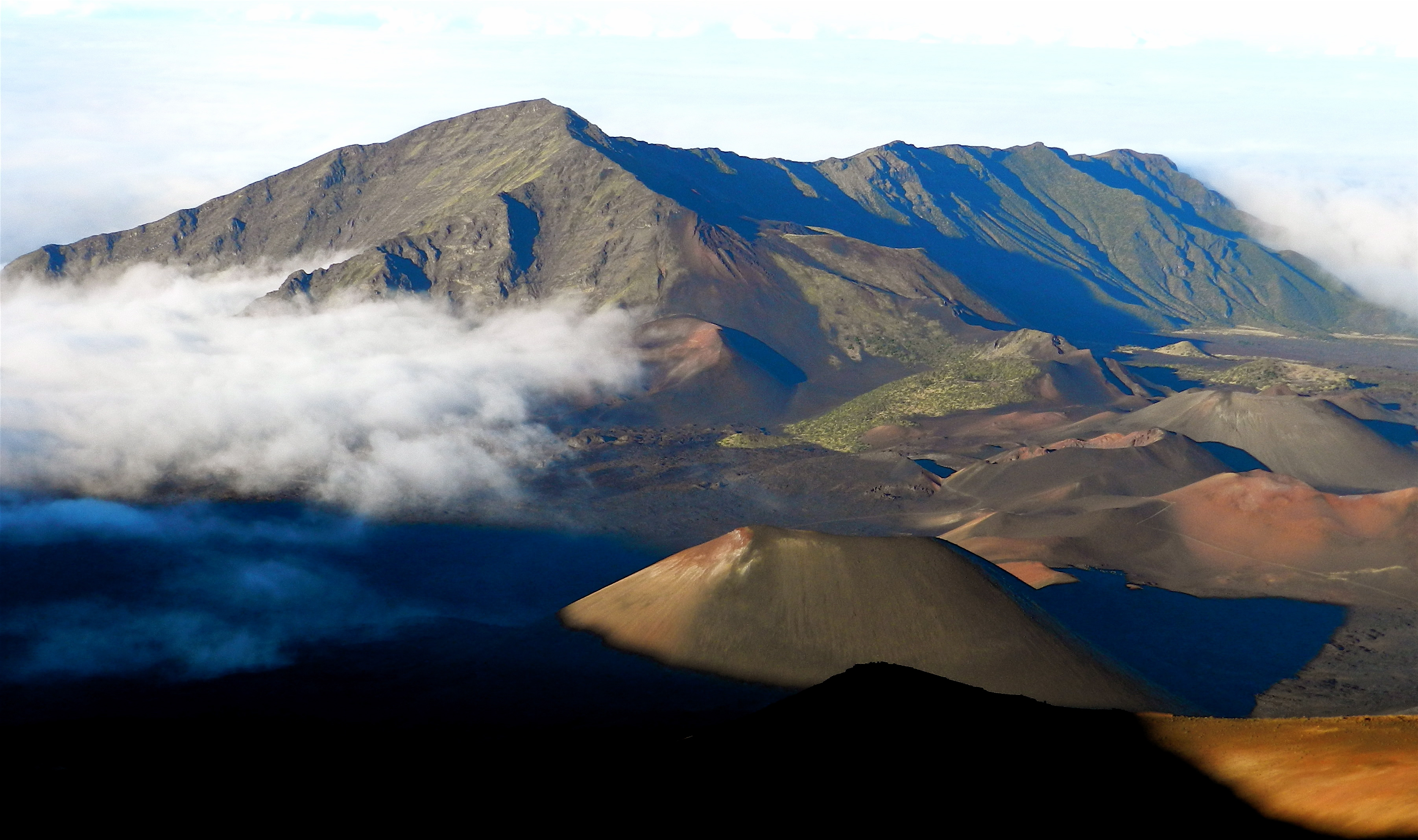
Haleakalā is the highest summit of the Island of Maui.

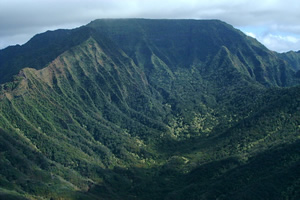
Kaʻala is the highest summit of the Island of Oahu.

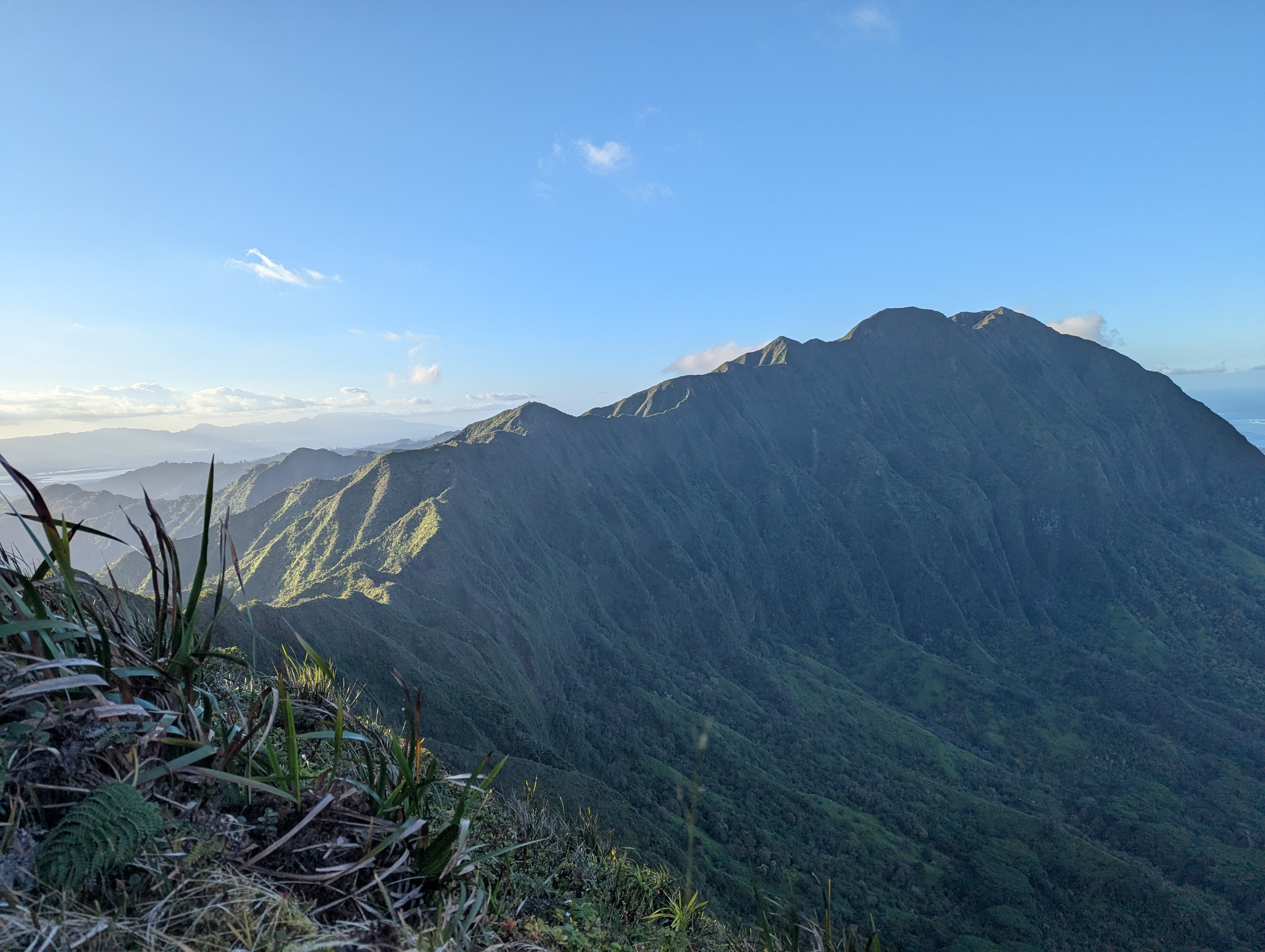
Konahuanui on Island of Oahu.

== See also ==
- List of mountain peaks of the United States
  - List of mountain peaks of Alaska
  - List of mountain peaks of Arizona
  - List of mountain peaks of California
  - List of mountain peaks of Colorado
  - List of mountain peaks of Hawaii
    - List of mountains of Hawaii
    - List of the ultra-prominent summits of Hawaii
  - List of mountain peaks of Idaho
  - List of mountain peaks of Montana
  - List of mountain peaks of Nevada
  - List of mountain peaks of New Mexico
  - List of mountain peaks of Oregon
  - List of mountain peaks of Utah
  - List of mountain peaks of Washington (state)
  - List of mountain peaks of Wyoming
- Hawaii
  - Geography of Hawaii
  - Geology of Hawaii
    - Category:Mountains of Hawaii
      - commons:Category:Mountains of Hawaii
- Physical geography
  - Topography
    - Topographic elevation
    - Topographic prominence
    - Topographic isolation
