= Kalahumoku I =

Aliʻi

- Aliʻi
- Spouse: Laʻamea
- Father: Kanipahu
- Mother: Hualani

Kalahumoku I—also known as Kalahuimoku—was an ancient Hawaiian noble and Chief of Hana, Hawaii. It's unknown when Kalahumoku was born. The Chief is mentioned in old chants.

Parents of Kalahumoku were Lady Hualani of Molokai and Chief Kanipahu—ruler of the Big Island. Kalahumoku was brother to Kanaloa and thus an uncle of Chief Kalapana. The chiefs were the members of the "Pili line“. Kalahumoku's maternal grandparent was Chiefess Kamauliwahine, ruler of Molokai.

== Spouse and child ==
Sometime after or before Kalapana came to the throne, Kalahumoku settled at Kauwiki on Maui and became a chieftain of Hāna. Kalahumoku married Laʻamea and begot a son, Iki-a-Laʻamea.

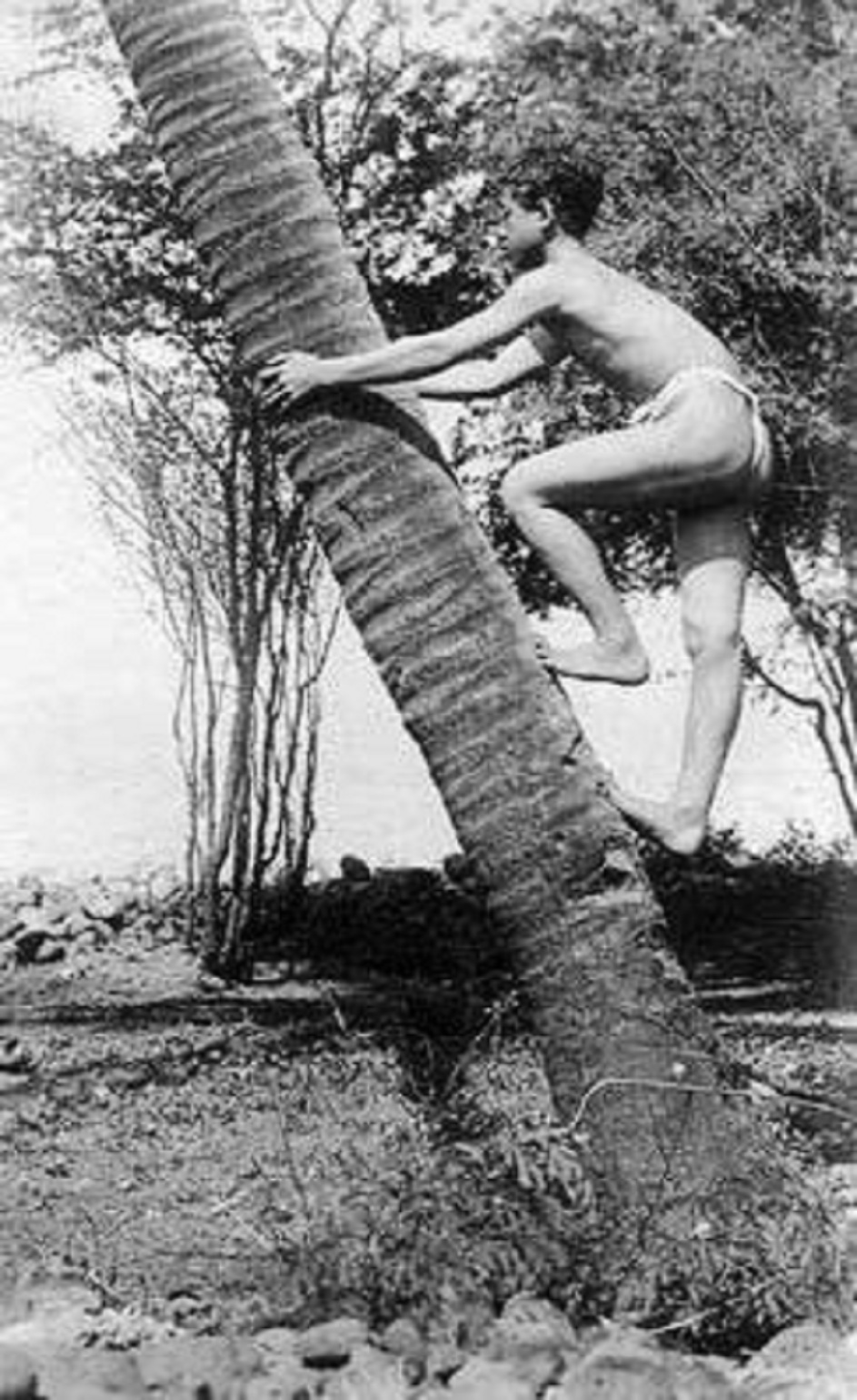
Kalahumoku had been brought up in retirement in the countryside of the Big Island.
