= Olokui =

Mountain in Hawaii, United States of America

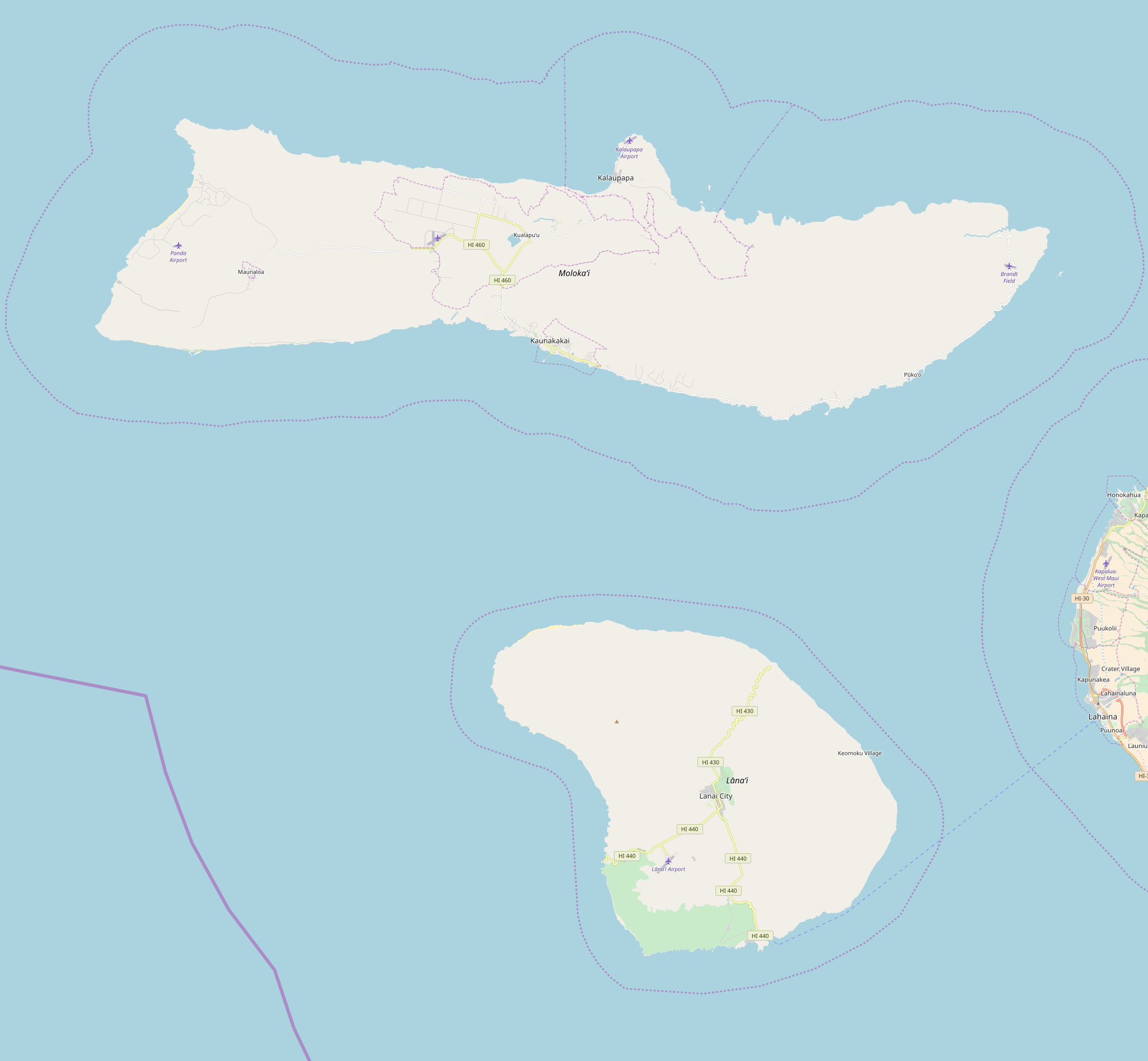
- Location within Molokai and Lanai Location within Hawaii

Highest point
- Elevation: 4,602 ft (1,403 m)
- Prominence: 4,602 ft (1,403 m)
- Coordinates: 21°7′57″N 156°50′59″W

Naming
- Language of name: Hawaiian

Geography
- Location: Molokai, Hawaii, U.S.
- Parent range: Hawaiian Islands
- Topo map: USGS

Geology
- Mountain type: Shield volcano
- Volcanic zone: Hawaiian–Emperor seamount chain

Climbing
- Easiest route: Kolo Ridge

Olokui is the second highest peak on the island of Molokai, surpassed by only Kamakou. At 4,602 feet (1,403 m), it marks the divide between the Pelekunu and Wailau valleys. It is part of the extinct East Molokai shield volcano, which comprises the east side of the island. On the west it is bounded by the Kapapa Pali, and on the south and east sides, there is a steep drop down to the Pulena stream and Wailau River, respectively. The north side of the mountain was destroyed in a catastrophic collapse along with the majority of the northern half of the island 1.4 million years ago. The remnants of this event are 3,200 foot sea cliffs. At the summit of Olokui, much like the tops of other high mountains in Hawaii, is a remote bog. The name Olokui translates to "tall hill", and according to oral tradition, was the place the people of the village of Pelekunu retreated to in a battle between islands.

== See also ==
- List of mountain peaks of the United States
  - List of volcanoes of the United States
    - List of mountain peaks of Hawaii
- List of Ultras of Oceania
- List of Ultras of the United States
- Hawaii hotspot
- Evolution of Hawaiian volcanoes
- Hawaiian–Emperor seamount chain
