= Loe of Maui =

Loe Chief of Maui
Father	Kamaloohua
Mother	Kapu of Maui
Wife	Wahaʻakuna
Issue	Kahokuohua

Loe (Hawaiian: Loe o Maui) was a High Chief in ancient Hawaii. Loe was the sovereign chief of the island of Maui, mentioned in old chants, and ancestor of Kalahumoku II.

== Life ==
Loe was a son of the Chief Kamaloohua by his consort, Kapu of Maui, and thus a grandson of Kuhimana. He followed his father as chief of Maui.

Although war did not occur between Maui and any of the other islands during his reign, there was a disturbance in his father's reign.

He married a woman named Wahaʻakuna, who is mentioned by Samuel Kamakau. They had a son named Kahokuohua, who was a King of Molokaʻi island.

Loe is considered to be the great progenitor of the Maui chiefdom. His successor was his grandson, Kaulahea I.

Preceded by Kamaloohua	Alii nui of Maui	Succeeded by Kaulahea I
