= Kamaloʻohua =

15th-century king of Maui

- King of Maui
- Successor: Loe
- Born: C. 1416; Maui?
- Consort: Kapu of Maui
- Issue: High Chief Loe of Maui
- House: House of Maui
- Father: King Kuhimana
- Mother: Queen Kaumana I
- Religion: Hawaiian religion

Kamaloʻohua (also called Kamalu-Ohua) (ca. 1416) was a High Chief in ancient Hawaii, according to Hawaiian mythology, and is mentioned in old legends and chants. He was Moʻi, or king of Maui island.

It is said that he was a descendant of mythical chief Paumakua of Maui.

There is no archaeological record for him.

== Family ==
In ancient chants the genealogy of Kings of Maui is described.

Kamaloʻohua was a son of King Kuhimana and his sister Kaumana I and thus grandson of King Alo of Maui and his wife Moekeaea.

He married woman named Kapu, but her parents are not known. (For a meaning of her name, see kapu.)

Their son was King Loe of Maui and their grandson was King Kahokuohua of Molokai.

== Legends ==
There are two famous legends about Kamaloʻohua. One legend informs us about a great war.

=== War ===
According to the legend, Kamaloʻohua was attacked, defeated, and taken as prisoner by King Kalaunuiohua of Hawaiʻi island. Kalaunuiohua went on Oahu island, taking his prisoners with him. It is doubtful if Oʻahu had any recognised sovereign at the time.

Later, Kamaloʻohua returned to his island and it was the time of peace.

=== Arrival of light skin people ===
This legend informs us that during the lifetime of Kamaloʻohua happened a strange event:

A vessel called Mamala arrived at Wailuku. The captain's name is said to have been Kaluiki-a-Manu, and the names of the other people on board are given in the tradition as Neleike, Malaea, Haʻakoa and Hika. These latter comprised both men and women, and it is said that Neleike became the wife of Wakalana and the mother of his son Alo-o-ia, and that they became the progenitors of a light-coloured family, poe ohana Kekea and that they were white people with bright, shining eyes. The tradition further states that their descendants were plentiful in or about Waimalo and Honouliuli on Oʻahu, and that their appearance and countenances changed by intermarriage with the Hawaiian people.

It is evident that no Europeans traversed the Pacific Ocean at the time of Kamaloʻohua, and that these white or light-coloured foreigners probably were the crew of some Japanese vessel driven out of her course, and brought by winds to these shores (or the ships of Álvaro de Saavedra's expedition). That the Hawaiian natives regarded these castaways as of an alien race is evident.

Another version of the same tradition, while substantially the same as the foregoing, differs somewhat in the names of the new arrivals; and the event is ascribed to the time of Kamaloʻohua, while the other ascribes it to the time of Wakalana. Kamaloʻohua and Wakalana were contemporary.

== Family tree ==
Family tree of King Kamaloʻohua

King Alo of Maui
Chief Kuhimana of Maui
Chiefess Moekeaea
Chief Kamaloʻohua of Maui
King Alo of Maui
Kaumana I of Maui
Chiefess Moekeaea
King Loe of Maui
Chiefess Kapu of Maui
King Kahokuohua of Molokaʻi
Chiefess Wahaʻakuna
