= Kaulahea I =

- High Chief of Maui
- Consort: Lady Kapohanaupuni
- Issue: Kakaalaneo; Kakae
- Father: Kahokuohua of Molokaʻi
- Mother: Hikakaiula

Kaulahea I was a High Chief of the Hawaiian island of Maui.

== Reign ==
During his reign, war did not occur between Maui and any of the other islands. This is a contrast to the disturbance in Kamaloʻohua's reign. Samuel Kamakau wrote that Kaulahea was born at Kūkaniloko Birth Site.

== Family ==
Kaulahea was a son of Kahokuohua, Chief of Molokai and Hikakaiula, the Chiefess. Kaulahea followed his grandfather Loe as ruler of Maui, and married his sibling, Kapohanaupuni. She bore two sons, Kakae and Kakaalaneo to Kaulahea. Kaulahea's sons jointly ruled as Chiefs of Maui.

| Preceded by Loe of Maui | Aliʻi nui of Maui | Succeeded by Kakae; Kakaʻalaneo |
