= Kalaikuʻahulu =

Kalaikuʻahulu (also known as Kaleikuahulu, Kuahulu and Kua) was a kānaka maoli (Native Hawaiian) aliʻi (hereditary noble) and kahuna nui (high priest) of Kamehameha I in pre-Christian Hawaii who was considered a prophet for his prediction of; "Ke Akua maoli" and a message to Hawaiians never seen before. After the arrival of the Christian missionaries in 1820, Kaʻahumanu and others believed the prophecy to be fulfilled. He was also genealogist for Kamehameha, who placed his wives, Kekāuluohi and Hoapiliwahine, under his tutelage as genealogy students.

In 1805, as a skilled genealogist and orator, Kalaikuʻahulu won a match reciting genealogies in Lahaina, Maui over his competitor from Bora Bora Five years later Kamehameha I negotiated the peaceful unification of the islands with Kauaʻi. Kalaikuʻahulu was instrumental in the monarch's decision not to kill Kaumualiʻi, the ruler of that island, when he was the single member of the aliʻi council to agree with Kamehameha's own reluctance to do so. The other aliʻi continued with the plan to poison Kaumualiʻi when Isaac Davis warned him, making the ruler cut his trip short and return to Kauaʻi, leaving Davis to be poisoned by the aliʻi instead.

== Birth and ancestry ==
Kalaikuʻahulu was born in 1725 at Kainalu on Molokai as the son and keiki aliʻi (prince or child of a chief) of Kumukoa (k), aliʻi nui of Molokai and son of Kanealai (also known as Kanealiʻi) and Keaweʻīkekahialiʻiokamoku. The Kapana heiau in Halawa Valley was built by Kalaikuʻahulu in the early part of the 18th century.

== Notable works and achievements ==
One of Kalaikuʻahulu many works was; "A Wakea Creation Chant". While written in a more contemporary period, it is likely based on older traditions.
