= Kanipahu =

- Chief of Hawaiʻi
- Consorts: Hualani of Molokai; Alaʻikauakoko (half-aunt)
- Issue: Kanaloa; Kalahumoku I Kalapana of Hawaiʻi?
- Father: Kaniuhu, Aliʻi of Hawaiʻi Island
- Mother: Hiliamakani

Kanipahu (ruled until cca. 1245) was an ancient Hawaiian chief. He was of the Pili line and was a ruler of the Big Island.

Kanipahu was a son of Aliʻi Kaniuhu and his wife Hiliamakani.

After Kanipahu lived on Molokaʻi and it was discovered that he was a chief, he was taken (as husband) by Hualani, the ruling chiefess of Molokaʻi. One of the neverforgotten fact of Kanipahuʻs descendants was this marriage. Hualani was the great-granddaughter of Nuakea, who was the granddaughter of Maweke. Beside Hualani, of Molakaʻi and Oʻahu descent above mentioned, he also married his half-aunt, Alaʻikauakoko, who at one time, whether previously or subsequently cannot now be ascertained, was the wife of Lakona of Oahu. With one of them he fathered two sons: Kanaloa—father of Kalapana of Hawaiʻi—and Kalahumoku I, ancestor of Akahiʻakuleʻana.

David Malo said Alaʻikauakoko was the mother of Kalapana, making Kalapana Kanipahu’s son instead of grandson. Malo skips this generation, showing Kalapana as the son of Kanipahu.

Preceded by Kaniuhu	Aliʻi nui of Hawaii; 1215 — 1245	Succeeded by Kamaiole
