= Kalapana =

Kalapana may refer to:

- Kalapana (band), a Hawaiian pop music group
- Kalapana, Hawaii, a town on the Island of Hawaiʻi
- Kalapana of Hawaiʻi (1255-1285), Chief of Hawaii
