= Kawaikini =

Extinct shield volcano and highest peak on the island of Kaua'i

- Mount Waiʻaleʻale
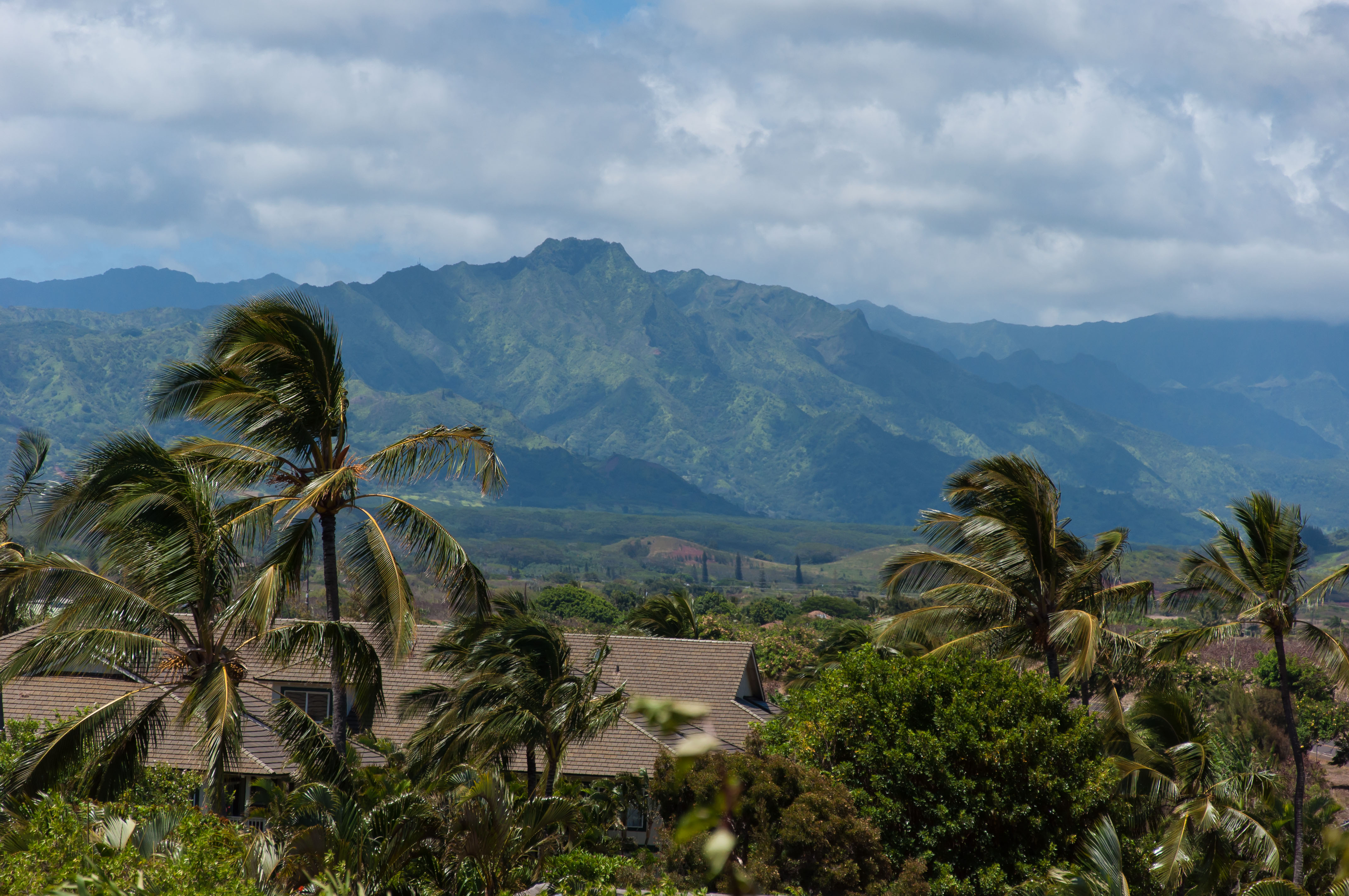

Highest point
- Elevation: 5,243 ft (1,598 m)
- Prominence: 5,243 ft (1,598 m)
- Listing: US most prominent peak 110th Ribu
- Coordinates: 22°03′24″N 159°29′48″W

Geography
- Location within Hawaii
- Location: Kauaʻi County, Hawaii, United States
- Parent range: Hawaiian Islands

Geology
- Mountain type: Shield volcano
- Volcanic zone: Hawaiian–Emperor seamount chain

Climbing
- First ascent: Ancient Hawaiians (Unknown Time)
- Easiest route: Mountaineering Trek

Kawaikini is a shield volcano on the Hawaiian Island of Kauaʻi and in Kauaʻi County and measures 5,243 feet (1,598 m) in elevation. It is the summit of the island's inactive central shield volcano, Mount Waialeale. Other peaks on Kauaʻi include: Waiʻaleʻale (5,148 feet), Nāmolokama Mountain (4,421 feet), Kalalau Lookout (4,120 feet), Keanapuka Mountain (4,120 feet), Haupu (2,297 feet) and Nounou (1,241 feet).

== Description ==
A rain gauge placed on the nearby Waialeale lake records daily rainfall and regularly lands Kauaʻi's peaks on the National Climatic Data Center's list of places averaging the highest annual rainfall. This high rainfall makes reaching the summit difficult on most days.

The rain is not the only barrier to reaching Kawaikini. The Alakai Wilderness Preserve is located to the west and its miles of dense, swampy forest limit access to the summit. To the north, east, and south, Kawaikini is protected by steep, wet cliffs.

== Etymology ==
Ka wai kini literally translates to "the multitudinous water" in the Hawaiian language, referring to the island's high rainfall.

== See also ==
- List of mountain peaks of the United States
  - List of volcanoes of the United States
    - List of mountain peaks of Hawaii
- List of Ultras of Oceania
- List of Ultras of the United States
- Hawaii hotspot
- Evolution of Hawaiian volcanoes
- Hawaiian–Emperor seamount chain
