= Kaulahea =

Kaulahea may refer to:

- Kaulahea I, 10th Moi of Maui
- Kaulahea II, 22nd Moi of Maui
- Kaulahea Kaohelalani Wilcox, Hawaiian prince, son of Orson Kiha-a-Piilani Wilcox
