= Pēpēʻōpae =

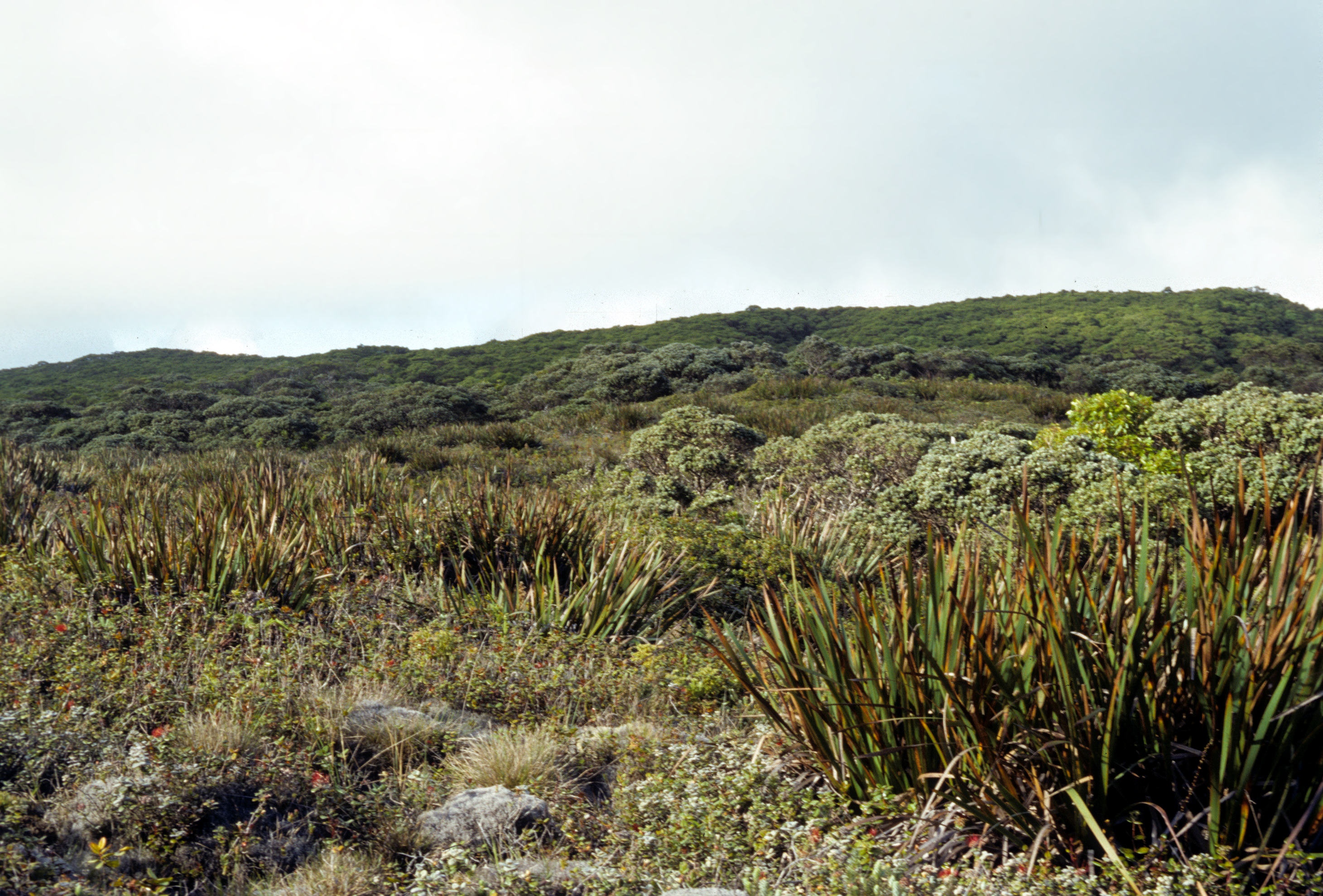
Pēpēʻōpae Bog and forest edge

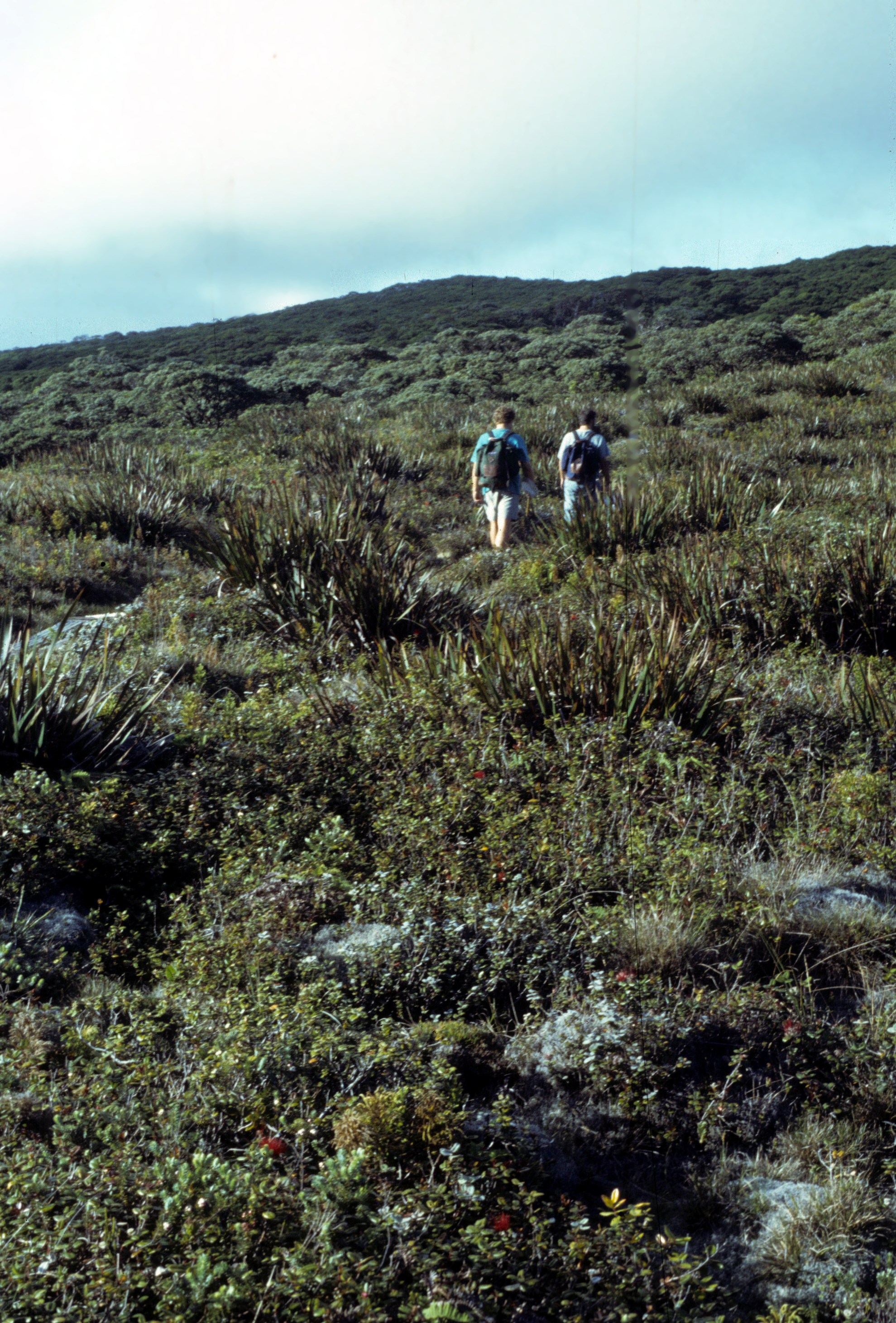
Pēpēʻōpae Bog

Pēpēʻōpae is a bog on the island of Molokaʻi in Hawaii.

== Description ==
Pēpēʻōpae is located near the summit of Kamakou peak in eastern Molokaʻi at an elevation of about 4,800 feet (1,500 m) at 21°7′8″N 156°53′45″W. Poorly draining acidic soil leached of nutrients, rainfall that exceeds 300 inches (760 cm), cooler temperatures and high winds have resulted in a bog where the canopy has been reduced to plants that are only inches above the ground. Typical forest canopy trees such as ʻōhiʻa lehua (Metrosideros polymorpha) and ʻōlapa (Cheirodendron trigynum) can be found as groundcover, crawling along the surface.

Pēpēʻōpae bog is home to several endemic and endangered plant and animal species, including the Hawaiʻi bog violet (Viola maviensis), alani (Melicope spp.), sedges, lepelepe a moa (Selaginella arbuscula), among many others. Endemic Drosophila species, wingless flies, and damselflies can also be found in the bog.

The bog is contained within The Nature Conservancy's Kamakou Preserve, and access to the boardwalk is limited to scheduled guided tours, due to the fragile nature of the ecosystem and extreme risk due to introduced alien species.

In the Hawaiian language, pēpē ʻōpae means "shrimp crushed".
