= Nuʻakea (deity) =

Hawaiian goddess of milk and lactation

- Goddess of milk and lactation
- Venerated in: Hawaiian religion
- Gender: Female
- Consort: Keʻoloʻewa

In Hawaiian mythology, Nuʻakea is a beneficent goddess of milk and lactation.

This name was also a title for a wet nurse of royal prince, according to David Malo.

Nuʻakea was appealed to, to staunch the flow of milk in the mother's breasts.

== Euhemerism ==
There was a chiefess named after the goddess—Nuʻakea, wife of Keʻoloʻewa, chief of Molokai.

Martha Warren Beckwith suggested that Nuʻakea was deified.

According to the myth, Nuʻakea was a goddess who came to Earth and married mortal chief Keʻoloʻewa, but it is known that historical Nuʻakea was born on Oahu.
