= Kamauaua =

Hawaiian aristocrat

- Spouse: Hinakeha
- Issue: Kaupeʻepeʻe-nui-kauila; Keʻoloʻewa

High Chief Kamauaua was a member of Hawaiian aristocracy and a ruler of Molokai. Although Kamauaua’s name appears as the first one on the list of Molokai’s rulers, it’s likely Kamauaua was not the first monarch of Molokaʻi.

The names of Kamauaua’s parents are unknown, but it’s known Kamauaua was married to Lady Hinakeha, who bore sons to Kamauaua:

- Kaupeʻepeʻe-nui-kauila
- Keʻoloʻewa
- Haili
- Uli-hala-nui

Keʻoloʻewa succeeded his father, although he wasn’t the oldest son, because Kaupeʻepeʻe-nui-kauila didn’t wish to rule. Kamauaua’s female descendants Kapau-a-Nuʻakea, Kamauliwahine and Hualani were “Princesses” of Molokaʻi, being the rulers, not the royal consorts, since gender didn’t play a large role in Hawaii, at least not regarding the succession.
