= Wailau =

Valley in Molokai, Hawaii

Wailau Valley
- Location within Hawaii
- Floor elevation: 321 feet (98 m)
- Area: 4 square miles (10 km^{2})

Geography
- Location: Hawaii
- Coordinates: 21°08′33″N 156°50′08″W
- Rivers: Wailau River, Pulena Stream, Waioke'ela Stream, Waiakeakua Stream
- Interactive map of Wailau Valley

Wailau is an isolated valley on the North Shore of the island of Molokai, Hawaii, It can be reached by boat (only in the summer), helicopter or by Wailau Trail from the southeast shore of the island which is heavily overgrown and virtually impassable in places.

The valley was an ancient ahupuaa, and well-populated until the 19th century, and contained many taro plantations. The valley is nearly unpopulated today, although Molokai residents occasionally camp by the beach at the mouth of the valley in the summer.

== Geography ==
Wailau valley was formed by stream erosion of the Wailau River, after the massive collapse of the East Molokai Volcano enabled streams from this part of the island to flow north. Numerous major landmarks dominate the area, such as Olokui, Molokai's second highest peak, and the Kukuinui Ridge. Others such as Malahini Cave are very difficult to access.

In the Hawaiian language wai lau literally means "many waters".
