= Kalapana of Hawaiʻi =

Chief of the Big Island

Kalapana was a high chief in ancient Hawaii.

Kalapana is also known as Kalapanakuʻioʻiomoa and Kalapaua. The name Kalapanakuʻioʻiomoa includes a longer form with a nickname. He is commonly referred to as Kalapa or Kalapana.

== Family ==
According to traditional accounts, Kalapana was possibly a son of Prince Kanaloa and his sister Makoʻani, who were the children of Hualani of Molokai and Chief Kanipahu.

Kalapana married Malamaʻihanaʻae, and their son was Chief Kahaimoelea.

== Reign ==
According to Hawaiian traditions, Kalapana succeeded the chief Kamaiole.

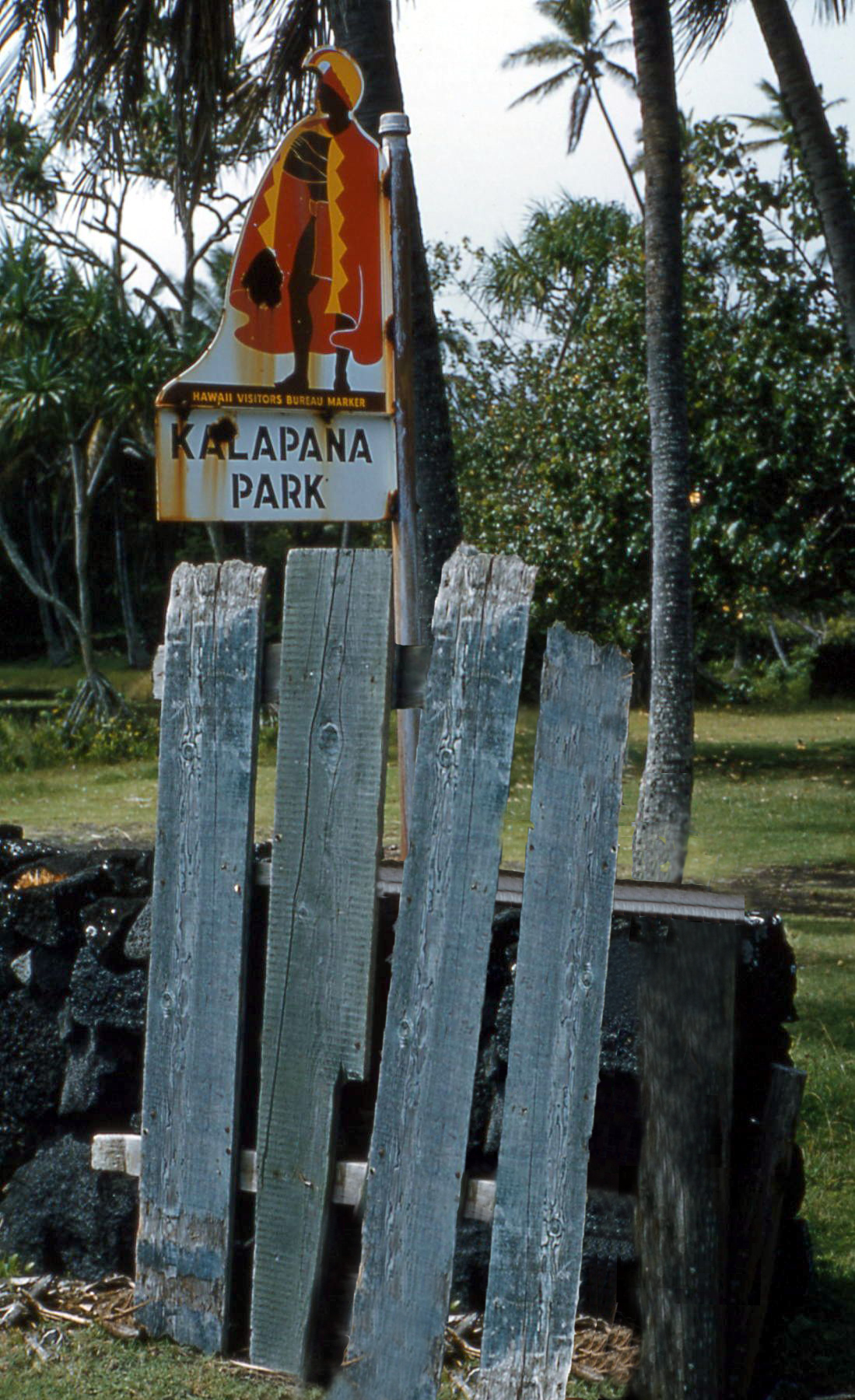
Kalapana shares his name with the town of Kalapana, Hawaii.
