= Kahaʻimaoeleʻa =

Hawaiian chief from c. 1285 to c. 1315

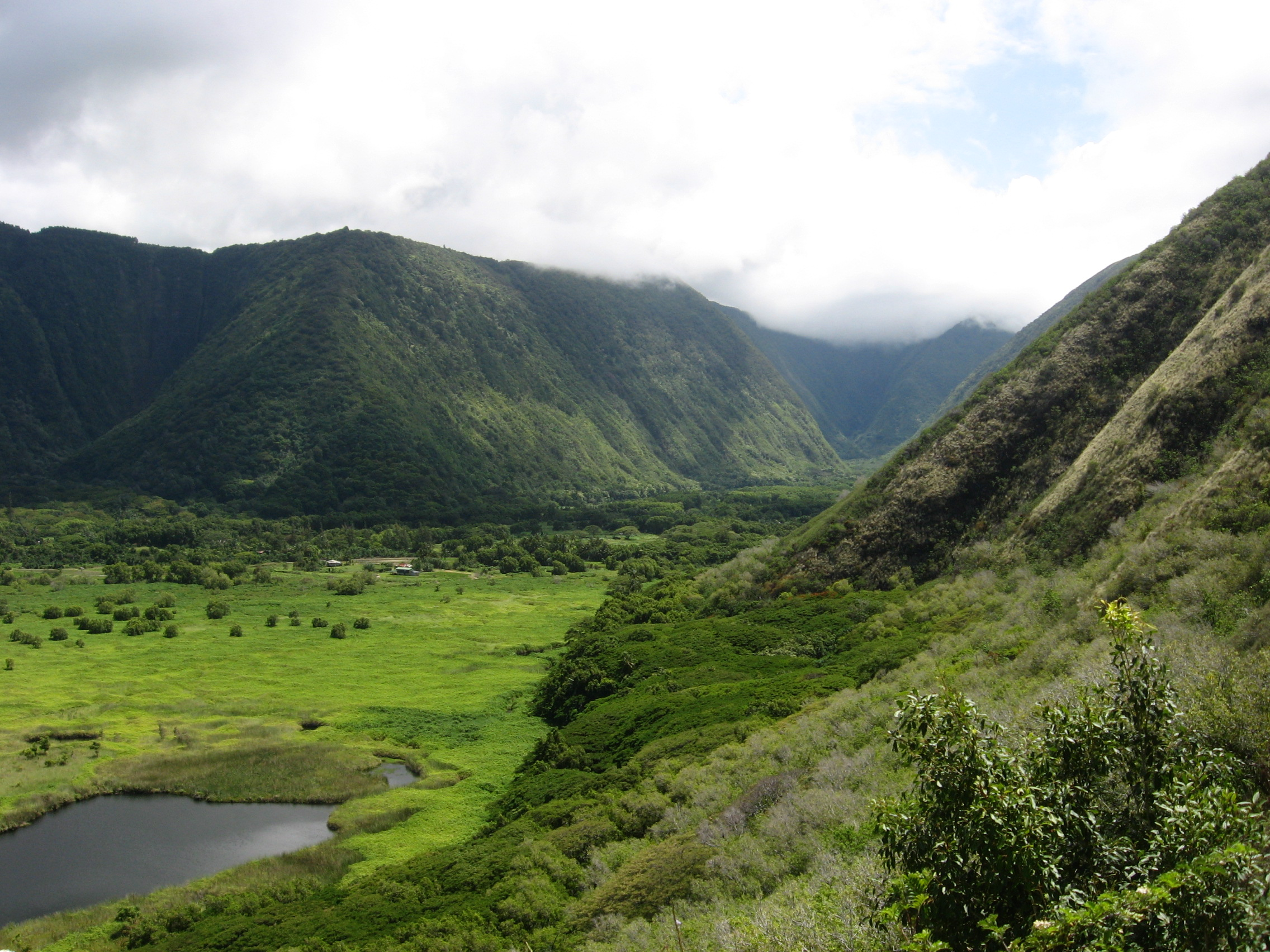
The residence of Kahaʻimaoeleʻa was in Waipiʻo Valley.

Kahaʻimaoeleʻa was a Hawaiian chief, who ruled as the aliʻi nui of Hawaiʻi from 1285 to 1315. He was the sovereign king or chief of the island of Hawaiʻi. He is sometimes referred as Kahai IV or Kahiamoeleaikaʻaikupou.

Waipiʻo Valley was first occupied as a royal residence by Kahaimoelea.

Kahaʻimaoeleʻa was a son of Chief Kalapana of Hawaiʻi by his wife, Lady Malamaʻihanaʻae. He followed his father as the sovereign of Hawaiʻi and fathered Kalaunuiʻōhua by his half-sister Kapoʻakaʻuluhailaʻa (Kapo-a-Kauluhailea).

Preceded by Kalapana of Hawaiʻi	Aliʻi Nui of Hawai‘i; 1285 – 1315	Succeeded by Kalaunuiohua
