= Kamaiʻole =

Hawaiian chief

Kamaiʻole is a chief mentioned in Hawaiian chants and legends. He was Aliʻi Nui ("king") by usurpation.

David Malo mentions that Kamaiʻole seized the kingdom of Kanipahu of Hawaii (the Big Island), who fled to the island of Molokai.

Kamaiʻole took many wives and many of his subjects were very angry at him. They asked priest Paʻao how to kill the chief.

He was later killed by Kalapana of Hawaiʻi, who then succeeded him on the throne.
