= Kaneʻalai =

Queen regnant of Molokai

Kaneʻalai (also known as Kane-a-Laʻe) was a Queen regnant of the Hawaiian island of Molokai, who lived in the 18th century. She ruled as Ali'i nui of Molokai.

She was a daughter of Luahiwa II (of the reigning family of Kauai) and Ka-hoʻoia-a-Pehu.

Kaneʻalai planted a mountain apple tree.

She married Keaweʻīkekahialiʻiokamoku, the king of Hawaiʻi. They had four children: Hao, Awili, Kaililoamoku, and Kumukoa the father of Kalaikuʻahulu.

After Keaweʻīkekahialiʻiokamoku died, Kaneʻalai became a wife of Kekaulike, the king of Maui. With him she had one daughter, Luahiwa, who married her half-brother Kahekili II.

It is probably because of Kaneʻalai that Kamehameha-nui, the son of Kekaulike and Kekuiapoiwa I, was raised as a young boy at Waialua, Molokaʻi, and because of her connection with Kekaulike that her son and grandsons and other chiefs of Molokaʻi went to the help of Kamehameha-nui in his fight with Kalaniʻōpuʻu.
