= Keanapuka Mountain =

Mountain on Kauaʻi in Hawaii, United States of America

Highest point
- Elevation: 1,252 m (4,108 ft)
- Coordinates: 22°10′5.47″N 159°37′11.55″W

Geography
- Location: Kauaʻi County, Hawaii, United States
- Parent range: Hawaiian Islands

Climbing
- Easiest route: Mountaineering Trek

Keanapuka Mountain is a mountain located on the Hawaiian Island of Kauaʻi. It rises 1,252 metres (4,108 ft) above the ocean floor and is located near the border of Na Pali Coast State Park. Due to its location, the mountain receives intense amounts of rain.
