= Lānaʻihale =

Hawaiian mountain

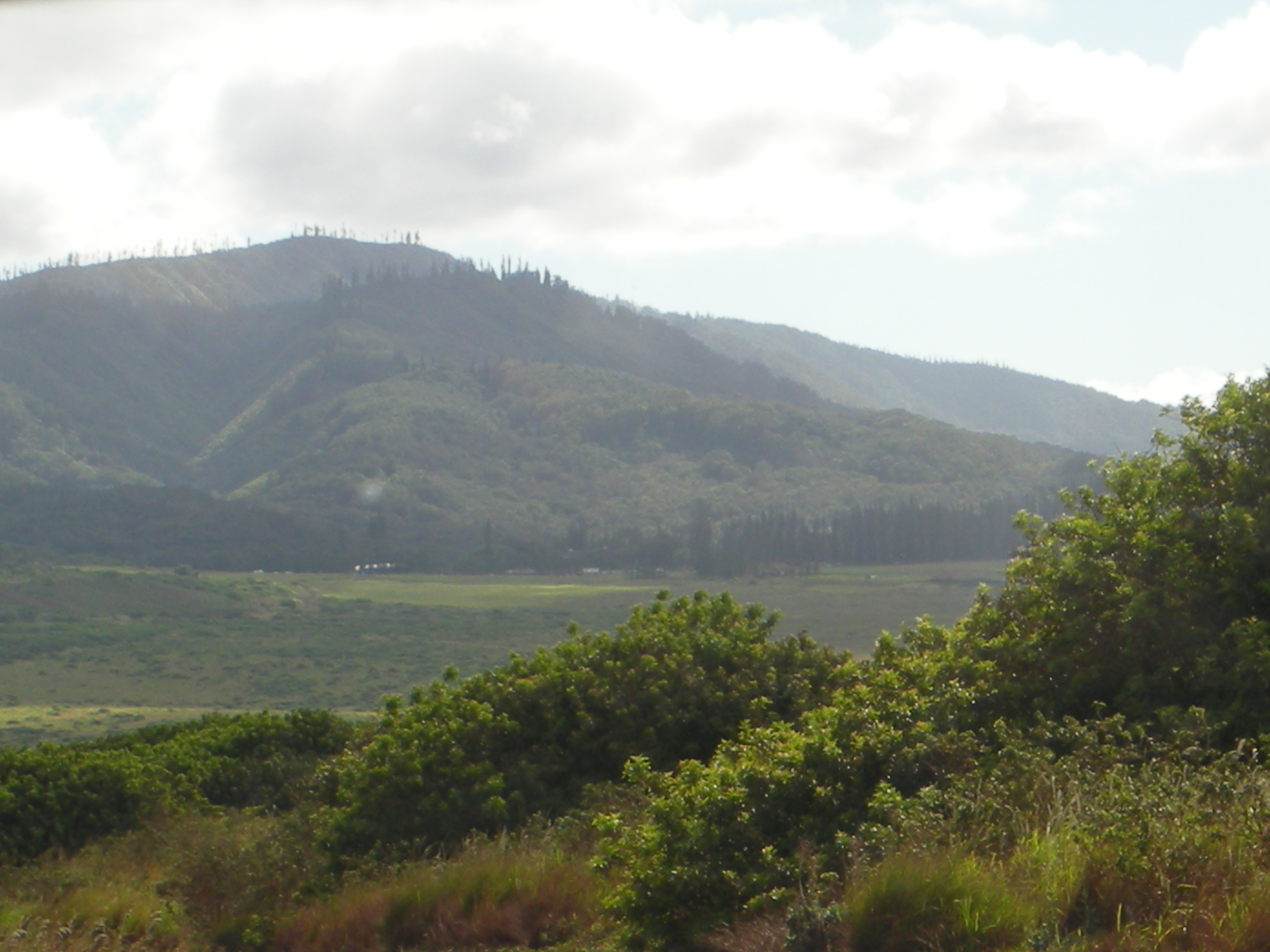
- Lānaʻi Mountains

Highest point
- Elevation: 1,030 m (3,380 ft)
- Prominence: 1,030 m (3,380 ft)
- Listing: Ribu
- Coordinates: 20°48′40″N 156°52′21″W

Geography
- Location within Hawaii
- Parent range: Hawaiian Islands

Geology
- Volcanic zone: Hawaiian–Emperor seamount chain

Lānaʻihale is a mountain peak in Hawaiʻi. It is the highest point of the island of Lānaʻi.
