= Kahokuohua =

- Aliʻi nui of Molokai
- Consort: Hiʻikawaiula
- Issue: Kaulahea I
- Father: Loe of Maui
- Mother: Wahaʻakuna
- Religion: Hawaiian religion

Kahokuohua (born ca. 1462) was a High Chief of the Hawaiian island of Molokai in the 15th century, and he is mentioned in old chants. His title was Aliʻi Nui.

== Biography ==
Kahokuohua was a son of Aliʻi Loe and his wife Wahaʻakuna, who is also called Waohaʻakuna.

Kahokuohua married Hikakaiula (Hiʻikawaiula) and their children were Kaulahea I and Princess Kapohanaupuni.

Abraham Fornander mentioned that one of the most famous rulers of Hawaiʻi was Kalaunuiohua. He invaded the island of Molokaʻi during the reign of Kahokuohua. After an obstinate battle Kahokuohua was conquered, and surrendered himself to Kalaunuiohua.
