= Kuhimana =

15th-century king of Maui

- Born: c. 1393; Maui
- Spouse: High Chiefess Kaumana I
- Children: King Kamaloʻohua; Princess Waohaʻakuna
- Parent: Luakoa of Maui and Hinaapoapo

In Hawaiian mythology, Kuhimana was a High Chief who ruled as the 7th known Moʻi of Maui. He was the sovereign king or chief of the island of Maui and is mentioned in old chants as semi-mythical person.

Not much is said about him in ancient legends. He was named after one god.

He was born c. 1393.

== Family ==
Kuhimana was son of Luakoa of Maui and thus a grandson of Paukei. He followed his father as king of Maui.

He married his sister, Chiefess Kaumana I and fathered Kamaloohua and a daughter named Waohaʻakuna, through whom Maʻilikākahi of Oahu became connected with the Maui line of chiefs. She does not appear by that name on the Kakuhihewaʻs pedigree, though, according to ancient custom, it was very common for high chiefs to be known by several names.

Kaumana is also known as Kaʻana.

When Kuhimana was slain at the Battle of Kaeleiki, his sister-bride was so distraught that she killed herself and fell over the corpse of her husband.

His son Kamaloʻohua would succeed him as Moʻi of Maui.

== Notes ==
Preceded by Luakoa	Moʻi of Maui	Succeeded by Kamaloohua
