= Kalaunuiʻōhua =

Ancient Hawaiian chief

- Spouse: Lady Kaheka (half-sister)
- Children: Chief Kūʻaiwa
- Parent(s): Lady Kapo; Chief Kahaʻimaoeleʻa

Kalaunuiʻōhua (nui = “great”, ʻōhua = "servant") was a High Chief of the island of Hawaiʻi in ancient Hawaii. He was a member of the Pili line. Kalau is his short name.

== Life ==
Kalaunuiʻōhua was born on Hawaiʻi (the Big Island), as a son of High Chief Kahaʻimaoeleʻa (Kahaʻi IV) and his half-sister, Lady Kapo. (According to the ancient legends, he was a descendant of the handsome noble ‘Aikanaka and the Moon goddess Hina.) He succeeded his father.

Kalaunuiʻōhua's wife was his half-sister, Chiefess Kaheka — they had the same mother. The couple produced at least one child, Chief Kuaiwa, the successor of his father Kalaunuiʻōhua. Kaheka later married Kunuiakanaele.

Kalaunuiʻōhua was famous warrior chief, and his battles are mentioned in the chants.He amassed an army and invaded the island of Maui, where Kamaluohua was the reigning chief. A battle was fought, in which Kamaluohua was defeated and taken prisoner. Kalaunuiʻōhua then preceded to invade the island of Molokaʻi, where Kahokuohua was the principal chief or Moi. Kahokuohua was conquered, and taken prisoner. Kalaunuiʻōhua now aimed at subjugating Oʻahu. Kalaunuiʻōhua landed his forces at Waiʻanae and gave battle to Huapouleilei, principal chief of the Ewa and Waianae division of Oʻahu. Huapouleilei was defeated and taken prisoner. Kalau did not sought to subjugate Kona or Koʻolau divisions of Oahu. With his combined Armies of Maui, Molokaʻi and Oahu, Kalau set sail for the island of Kauaʻi with the three captive kings in his train. At this time Kukona was the sovereign of Kauaʻi. Kalaunuiʻōhua landed on the coast of Koloa, and in battle outside Ka'ie'ie'waho was met by Kukona and all the Kauaʻi chiefs. A major battle ensued in which Kalaunuiʻōhua's army was thoroughly defeated, himself taken a prisoner by Kukona. It was known as War of Kawelewele. Chief Kukona immediately set the three captive kings free to return to their homes but he kept Kalaunuiʻōhua a close prisoner for several years. Negotiations were entered into with the Hawaii chiefs for the release of their king and Kalau was released, never to engage in warfare again. One old legend tells how he was not afraid of the priests or wizards and how he ordered the killing of the witch Waʻahia, whose spirit then became united with the soul of Kalaunuiʻōhua.
