= Hāʻupu =

- Location within Hawaii

Highest point
- Elevation: 2,297 feet (700 m)
- Prominence: 1,687 ft (514 m)
- Coordinates: 21°55′31″N 159°24′07″W

Geography
- Location: Kauaʻi County, Hawaii
- Parent range: Hawaiian Islands

Hāʻupu is a mountain peak located in Kauaʻi County, Hawaii.
