= Keʻoloʻewa =

High Chief of Molokai

Keʻoloʻewa was a Native Hawaiian and a High Chief of Molokai (a Hawaiian island). Because of his father, Keʻoloʻewa is also known as Keʻoloʻewa-a-Kamauaua, since Keʻoloʻewa's parents were Lord Kamauaua—the first known ruler of Moloka‘i—and his Chiefess consort, Lady Hinakeha. Hinakeha—likely named after Hina, the Moon goddess—and her spouse were Aliʻi, ancient Hawaiian aristocracy.

Kaupeʻepeʻe-nui-kauila was Keʻoloʻewa's older brother, whilst Keʻoloʻewa had two younger brothers; however, Keʻoloʻewa became his father's successor.

Keʻoloʻewa's wife was Lady Nuʻakea, a member of Maweke's family. Maweke was a chief and kahuna—wizard, so he was greatly admired because of the “black magic”. Nuakea's brother was a prophet and friend of Keʻoloʻewa's older brother. Keʻoloʻewa and his wife had at least one child, called Kapau-a-Nuʻakea (“Kapau, child of Nuakea”). She succeeded Keʻoloʻewa, whilst Keʻoloʻewa's descendant was Hualani, Chiefess regnant of Molokai and Chiefess consort of Hawai‘i (the Big Island).
