= East Molokaʻi Volcano =

Extinct shield volcano in Hawaii

- Wailau
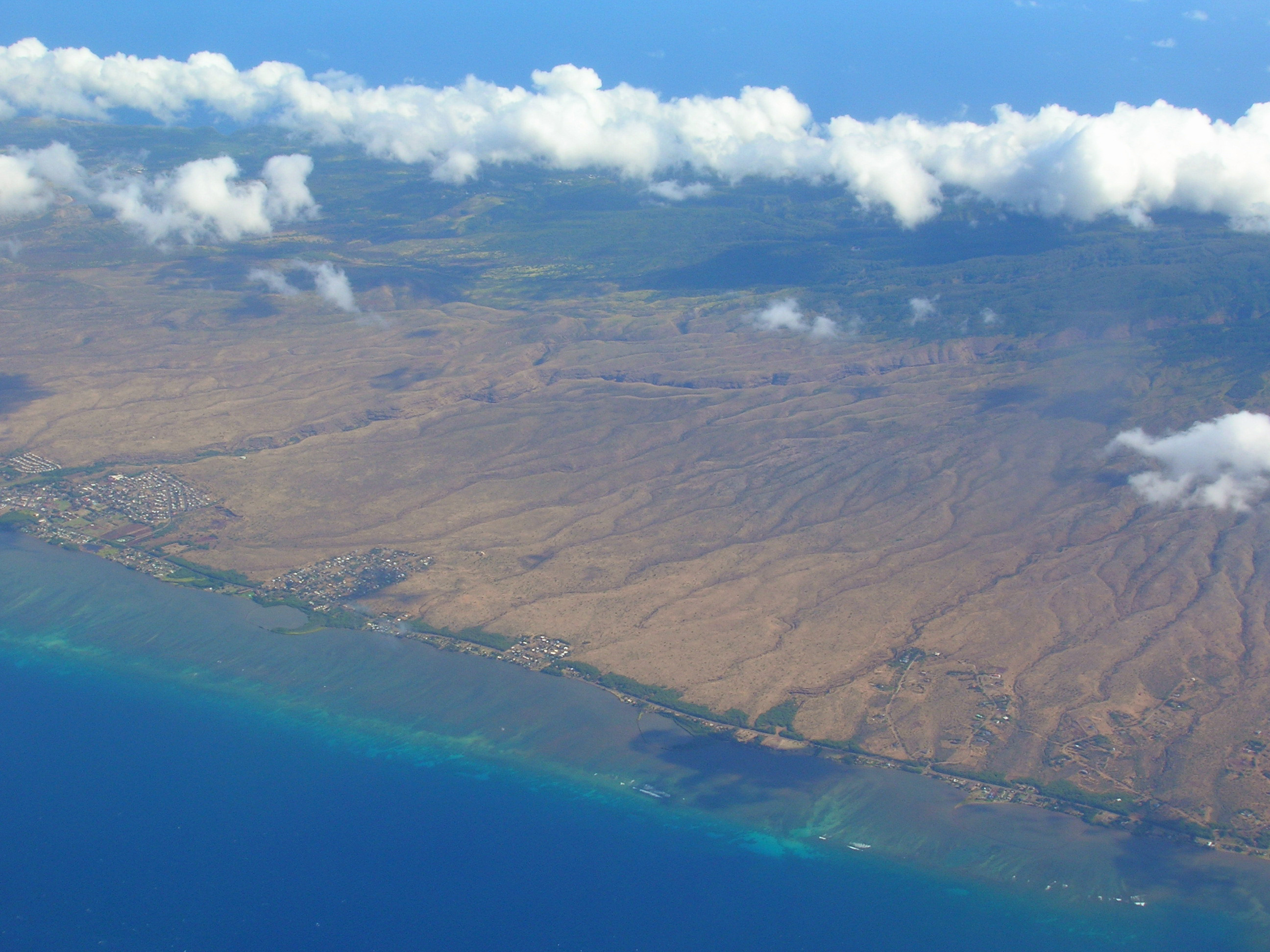
- Aerial photo of the southwestern flank of East Molokaʻi Volcano

Highest point
- Elevation: 1,512 m (4,961 ft)
- Coordinates: 21.11°N 156.84°W

Geography
- Location: Molokaʻi, Hawaii, United States
- Parent range: Hawaiian Islands

Geology
- Mountain type: Shield volcano
- Volcanic zone: Hawaiian-Emperor seamount chain

The East Molokaʻi Volcano, sometimes also known as Wailau for the Wailau valley on its north side, is an extinct shield volcano comprising the eastern two-thirds of the island of Molokaʻi in the U.S. state of Hawaii.

== Description ==
The East Molokaʻi has a width of 70 km (43 mi) and a length of 150 km (93 mi). It is overlapped by the West Molokaʻi, Lānaʻi and Haleakalā shield volcanoes. Its shield formation began two million years ago and ended 1.5 million years ago whereas its postshield eruptions occurred 1.5 to 1.3 million years ago. The pahoehoe shield volcano of the Kalaupapa Peninsula postdates the main shield volcano of East Molokaʻi and is considered to represent the last volcanic phase of East Molokaʻi.

East Molokaʻi was one of the seven principal volcanoes, along with West Molokaʻi, Lānaʻi, West Maui, East Maui, Penguin Bank and Kahoʻolawe, that formerly constituted the island of Maui Nui.

The highest point is the peak called Kamakou on the southern rim, at 21°6′23″N 156°52′5″W. The Pēpēʻōpae bog is just below the rim.

The northern flank of the volcano has been truncated by enormous cliffs rising 900 m (3,000 ft) from the sea. The sea cliffs were formed when the northern third of the East Molokaʻi Volcano suddenly collapsed and slid off into the sea, about 1.4 million years ago. The landslide was so fast and powerful that it extended 190 km (120 mi) into the sea, and generated a 600 m (2,000 ft)-high megatsunami that inundated the rest of Molokaʻi and severely damaged the surrounding Hawaiian Islands before eventually reaching the coastlines of California and Mexico.

== See also ==
- Kalaupapa, Hawaii
