= Kamakou =

Volcano in the U.S. state of Hawaii

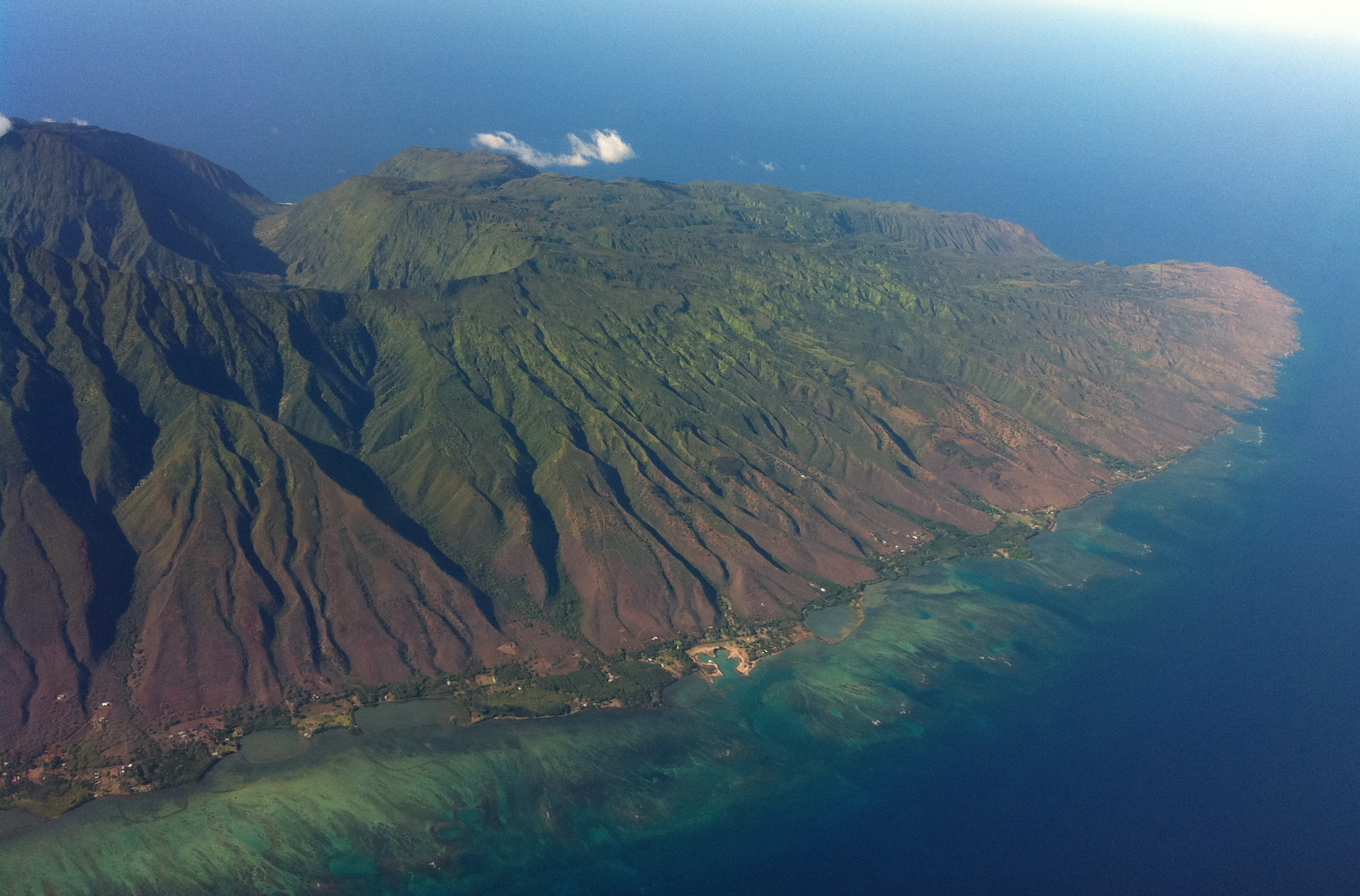
- Eastern Molokai with a portion of Kamakou and Molokai Forest Reserve

Highest point
- Elevation: 4,961 ft (1,512 m)
- Prominence: 4,961 ft (1,512 m)
- Listing: US most prominent peaks 127th Ultra
- Coordinates: 21°6′23″N 156°52′06″W

Naming
- Language of name: Hawaiian

Geography
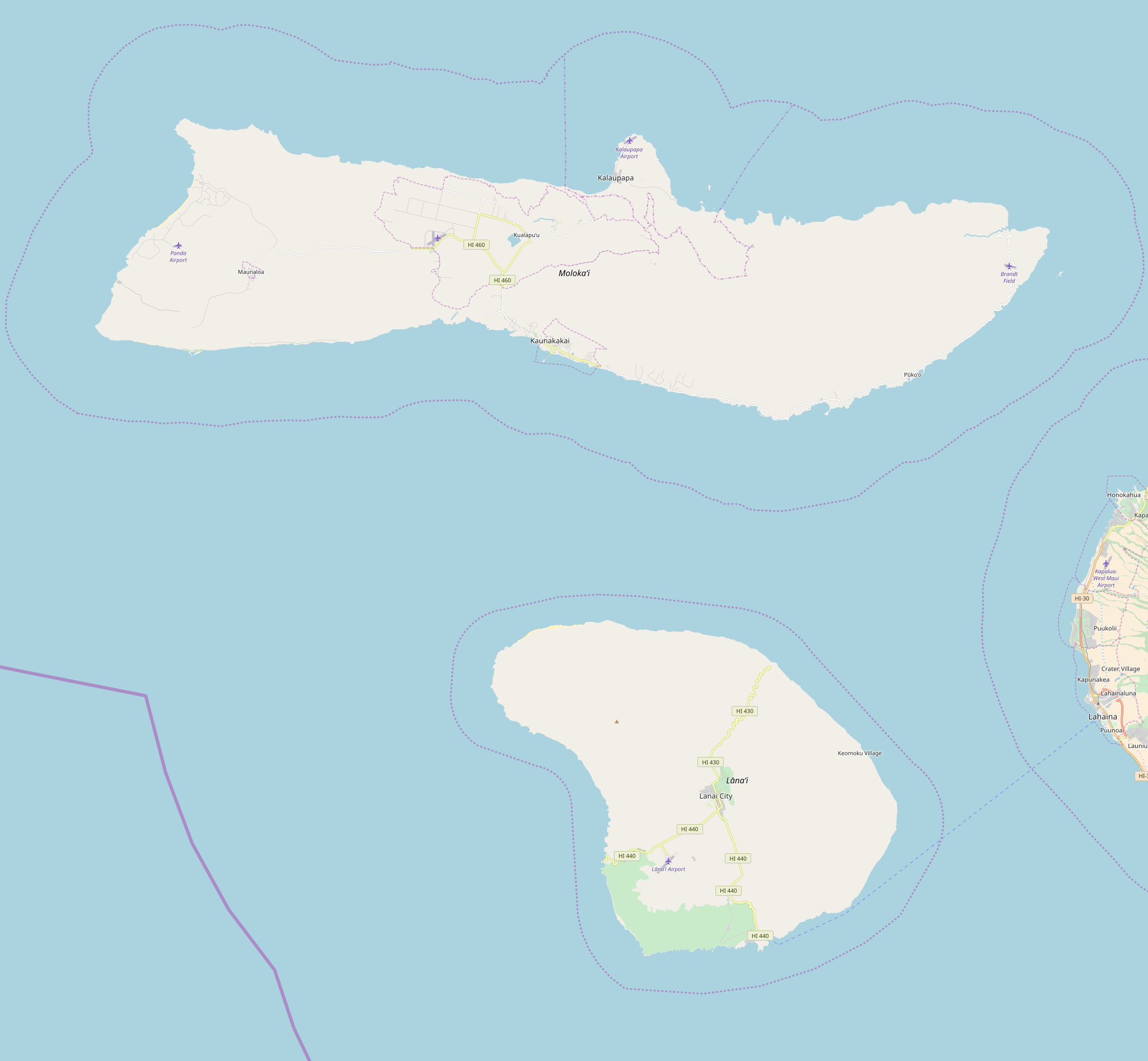
- Location within Molokai and Lanai Location within Hawaii
- Location: Molokai, Hawaii, U.S.
- Parent range: Hawaiian Islands
- Topo map: USGS

Geology
- Mountain type: Shield volcano (extinct)
- Volcanic zone: Hawaiian–Emperor seamount chain

Kamakou (Hawaiian: [kəməˈkow]) is a shield volcano on the island of Molokai in the U.S. state of Hawaii, with a summit elevation of 4,961 feet (1,512 m). It is part of the extinct East Molokai shield volcano, which comprises the east side of the island.

Kamakou is located within the 2,774-acre (11.23 km^{2}; 4.334 sq mi) Molokai Forest Reserve, estimated to contain more than 250 rare native Hawaiian plants, many of which exist only in this part of the world. Rare birds can also be found, with two examples being the olomaʻo (Molokai thrush) and kākāwahie (Molokai creeper). Monthly tours are held by The Nature Conservancy.

== See also ==
- List of mountain peaks of the United States
  - List of volcanoes of the United States
    - List of mountain peaks of Hawaii
- List of Ultras of Oceania
- List of Ultras of the United States
- Hawaii hotspot
- Evolution of Hawaiian volcanoes
- Hawaiian–Emperor seamount chain
