= Kapau-a-Nuʻakea =

- Chiefess of Molokaʻi
- Spouse: Lanileo
- Issue: Kamauliwahine
- Father: Keʻoloʻewa
- Mother: Nuʻakea

Kapau-a-Nuʻakea was a Chiefess of Molokaʻi.

Kapau-a-Nuʻakea was the only known child of Chief Keʻoloʻewa and Chiefess Nuʻakea.

Kapau-a-Nuʻakea and her husband Lanileo’s daughter, Kamauliwahine, succeeded Kapau-a-Nuʻakea.

Preceded by Keʻoloʻewa	Ruler of Molokaʻi	Succeeded by Kamauliwahine
