= Aliʻi nui of Molokai =

Hawaiian high chief

The Aliʻi nui were high chiefs of the four main Hawaiian Islands. The rulers of Molokaʻi, like those of the other Hawaiian islands, claimed descent from god Wākea.

The traditional history of Molokaʻi is fragmentary. The island was not of major political importance. Its importance lay in the connections its royal family made by marriage, and, in later years, the reputation of its sorcery and kahunas. Molokaʻi is the fifth largest of the eight main Hawaiian isles, and its size hindered it in its struggle for power and survival among the other islands of Maui, Oʻahu, Kauaʻi and Hawaiʻi.

By the end of the 17th century, as interisland conflict grew worse and worse, Molokaʻi suffered many blows from the powerful monarchs of other isles; notably Kapiiohookalani, Peleʻioholani and Kahekili II. Molokaʻi finally, and completely, succumbed to the might of Maui prior to the end of the ancient Hawaiian era.

== List of Aliʻi of Molokaʻi ==
- Kamauaua
- Keʻoloʻewa
- Kapau-a-Nuʻakea (female)
- Kamauliwahine (female)
- Hualani (female)
- some number of generations
- Kahokuohua
- some number of generations
- Kalanipehu
- some number of generations
- Kaneʻalai (female)
