= Kamauliwahine =

- Chiefess of Molokaʻi
- Spouse: Laniaiku
- Issue: Hualani
- Father: Lanileo
- Mother: Kapau-a-Nuʻakea

Kamauliwahine (wahine = “woman”) was Chiefess of Molokaʻi.

Kamauliwahine was the only known child of Lanileo and Chiefess Kapau-a-Nuʻakea of Molokaʻi. Kamauliwahine succeeded her mother in the dignity of Aliʻi Nui.

Kamauliwahine's daughter was Hualani and she inherited the monarchy after her motherʻs death. Father of Hualani was Laniaiku.

Preceded by Kapau-a-Nuʻakea	Chiefess of Molokai	Succeeded by Hualani
