= Hualani =

High Chiefess of Molokai

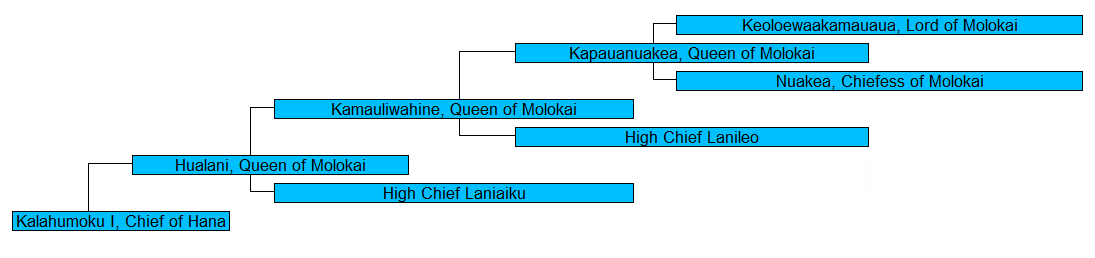
- Spouse: Kanipahu
- Issue: Kalahumoku I Kanaloa?
- Father: Laniaiku
- Mother: Kamauliwahine

Hualani (hua lani = "heavenly fruit") was a High Chiefess of Molokai in ancient Hawaii.

Hualani‘s parents were Chiefess Kamauliwahine and Laniaiku.

When Hualani discovered that a man named Kanipahu was a chief, she married him. Kanipahu and Hualani’s son was Kalahumoku I.
