= Molokaʻi =

Fifth-largest island in Hawaii

Nickname: The Friendly Isle, ʻĀina Momona
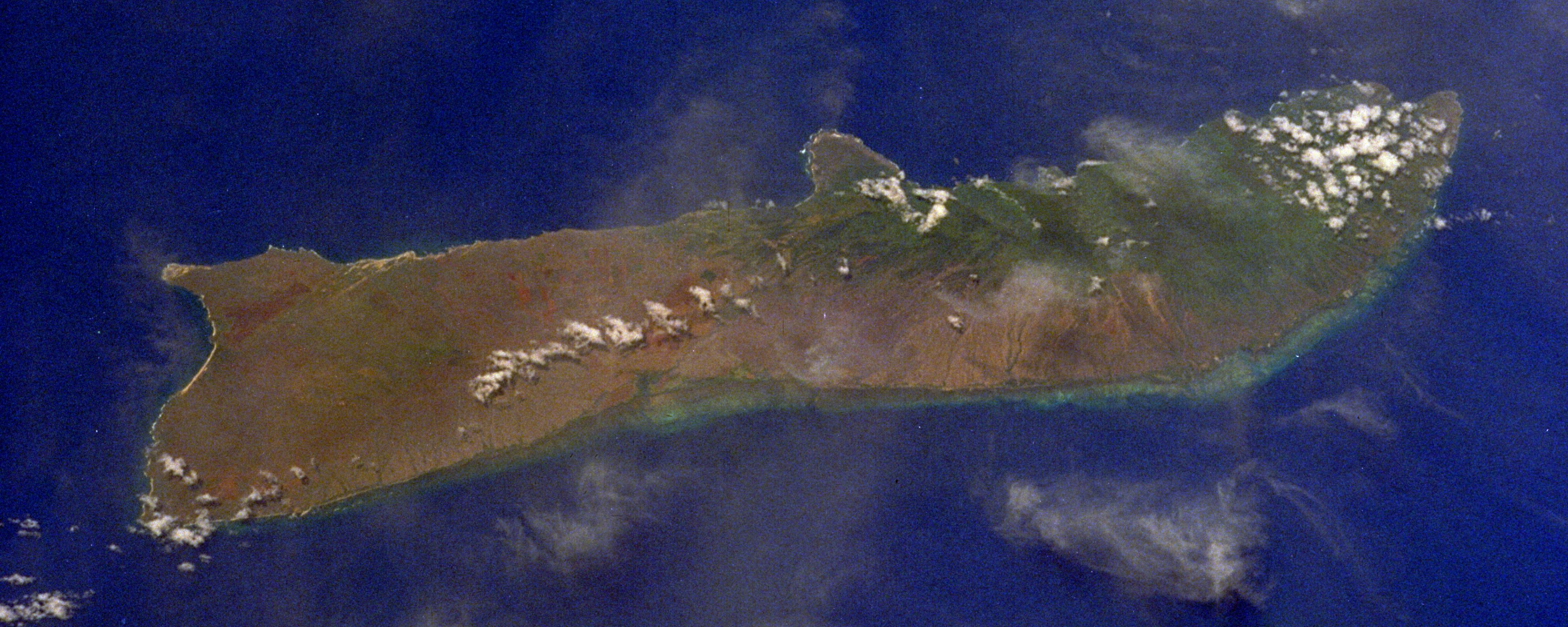
- Satellite image of Molokaʻi

- Location in the state of Hawaiʻi

Geography
- Coordinates: 21°08′06″N 157°00′36″W
- Area: 260 sq mi (670 km^{2})
- Area rank: Fifth-largest Hawaiian Island
- Highest elevation: 4,961 ft (1512.1 m)
- Highest point: Kamakou

Administration
- United States
- Symbols
- Flower: Kukui
- Color: ʻŌmaʻomaʻo (green)
- Largest settlement: Kaunakakai

Demographics
- Demonym: Molokaian
- Population: 7,345
- Pop. density: 28/sq mi (10.8/km^{2})

Molokaʻi or Molokai (Note: /moʊləˈkaɪ/ or /ˈmoʊləkaɪ/; Hawaiian pronunciation: [moloˈkɐʔi, moloˈkɐi] Molokaʻi dialect: [moɾoˈtɐʔi] or [moɾoˈtɐi]. Both pronunciations are used by native speakers.) is the fifth most populated of the eight major islands that make up the Hawaiian Islands archipelago in the middle of the Pacific Ocean. It is 38 by 10 miles (61 by 16 km) at its greatest length and width with a usable land area of 260 mi^{2} (673.40 km^{2}), making it the fifth largest in size of the main Hawaiian Islands and the 27th-largest island in the United States. It lies southeast of Oʻahu across the 25-mile-wide (40 km) Kaʻiwi Channel and north of Lānaʻi, separated from it by the Kalohi Channel.

The island's agrarian economy has been driven primarily by cattle ranching, pineapple production, sugarcane production and small-scale farming. Tourism comprises a small fraction of the island's economy, and much of the infrastructure related to tourism was closed and barricaded in the early 2000s when the primary landowner, Molokai Ranch, ceased operations due to substantial revenue losses. In Kalawao County, on the Kalaupapa Peninsula on the north coast, settlements were established in 1866 for quarantined treatment of persons with leprosy; these operated until 1969. The Kalaupapa National Historical Park now preserves this entire county and area. Several other islands are visible from the shores of Molokaʻi, including Oʻahu from the west shores; Lānaʻi from the south shores, and Maui from the south and east shores.

== Name ==
The island is known under several names by the local population: Molokaʻi ʻĀina Momona (land of abundance), Molokaʻi Pule Oʻo (powerful prayer), and Molokaʻi Nui A Hina (of the goddess Hina). (Note: Hina is the name of several different goddesses in Hawaiian tradition: see Hina (goddess)#Hawaii)

Both the form Molokai (without an ʻokina) and Molokaʻi (with) have long been used by native speakers of Hawaiian, and there is debate as to which is the original form, with conflicting claims as to which the elders used. The USGS and the Hawaiʻi Board on Geographic Names use the form with the ʻokina.

== Geography ==
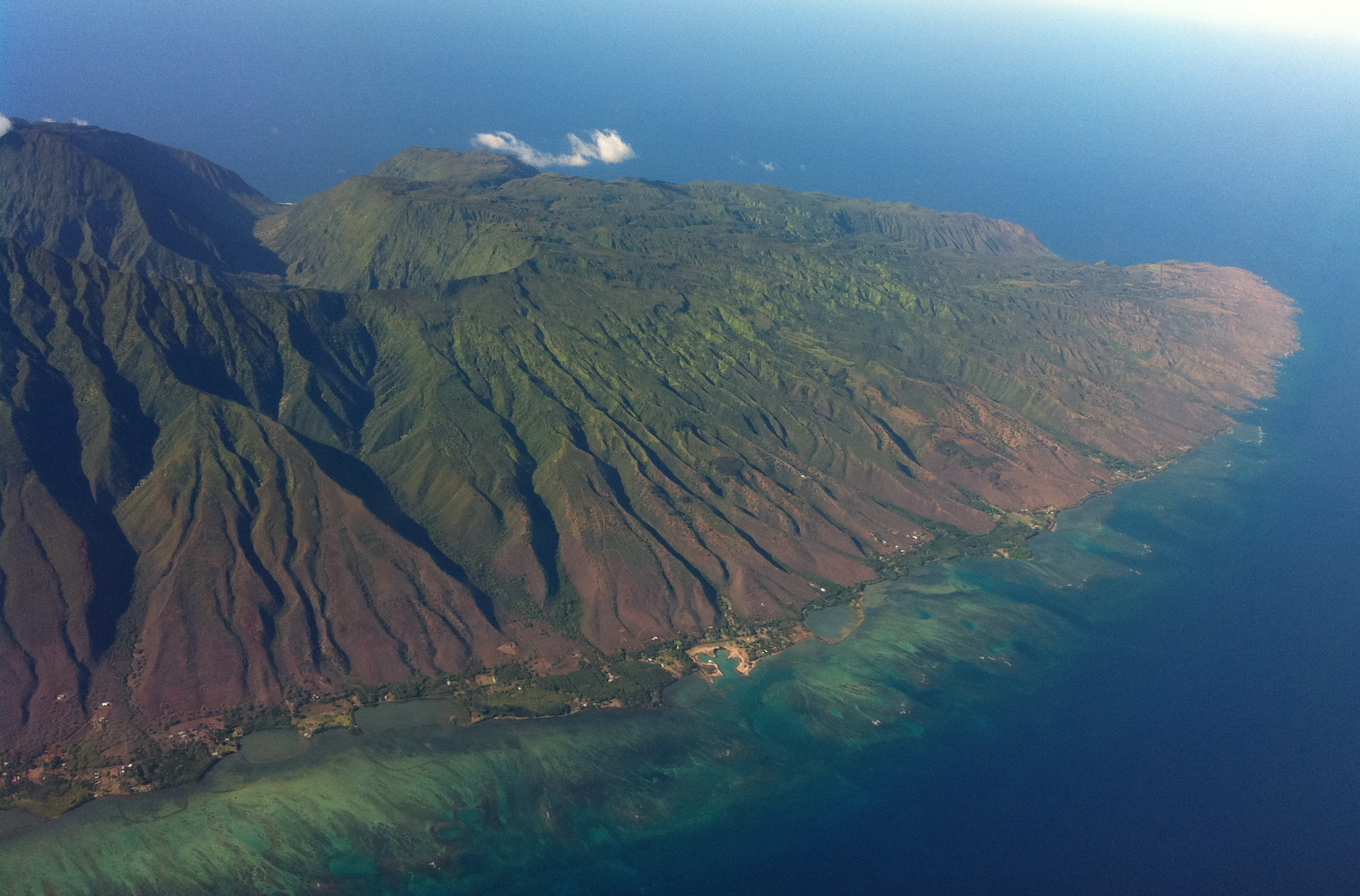
Eastern Molokaʻi with a portion of Kamakou and Molokaʻi Forest Reserve

Molokaʻi developed from two distinct shield volcanoes known as East Molokaʻi and the much smaller West Molokaʻi. The highest point is Kamakou on East Molokaʻi, at 4,970 ft (1,510 m). Today, East Molokaʻi volcano, like the Koʻolau Range on Oʻahu, is what remains of the southern half of the original mountain. The northern half suffered a catastrophic collapse about 1.5 million years ago and now lies as a debris field scattered northward across the bottom of the Pacific Ocean. What remains of the volcano on the island include the highest sea cliffs in the world. The south shore of Molokaʻi boasts the longest fringing reef in the U.S. and its holdings—nearly 25 mi (40 km) long.

Molokaʻi is part of the state of Hawaii and located in Maui County, Hawaii, except for the Kalaupapa Peninsula, which is separately administered as Kalawao County. Maui County encompasses Maui, Lānaʻi, and Kahoʻolawe in addition to Molokaʻi. The largest town on the island is Kaunakakai, which is one of two small ports on the island. Molokai Airport is located on the central plains of Molokaʻi.

The United States Census Bureau divides the island into three census tracts, Census Tract 317 and Census Tract 318 of Maui County and Census Tract 319 of Kalawao County. The total 2010 census population of these was 7,345, living on a land area of 260.02 mi^{2} (673.45 km^{2}). Molokaʻi is separated from Oahu to the northwest by the Molokai Channel, from Maui to the southeast by the Pailolo Channel and from Lanai to the south by the Kalohi Channel.

The Kauhakō Crater in central Molokaʻi is a soda lake. The island's second lake, Meyer Lake, is formed by a depression in andesite lava by the East Molokaʻi Volcano.

== Ecology ==
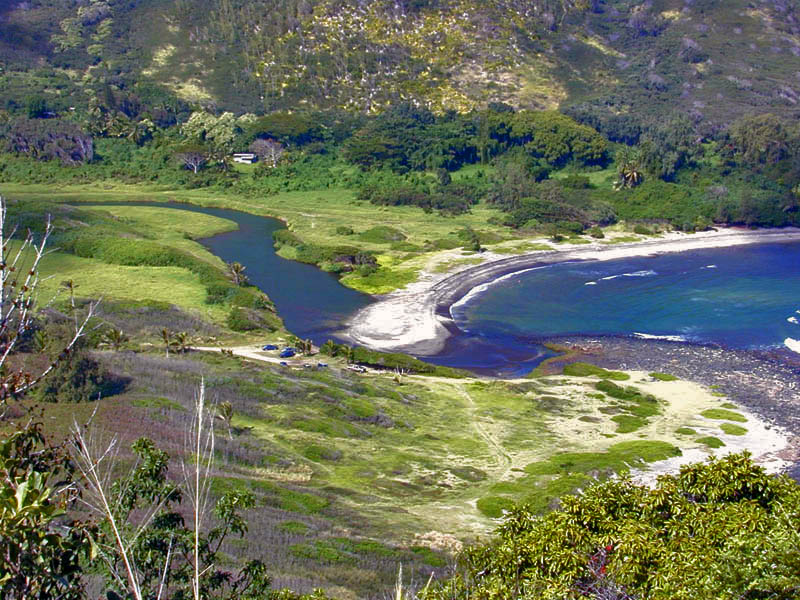
Halawa Bay Beach Park, located at the extreme east end of Molokaʻi

Molokaʻi is split into two main geographical areas. The low western half is very dry and the soil is heavily denuded due to poor land management practices, which allowed over-grazing by deer and goats. It lacks significant ground cover and virtually the entire section is covered in non-native kiawe (Prosopis pallida) trees. One of the few natural areas remaining almost intact are the coastal dunes of Moʻomomi, which are part of a Nature Conservancy preserve.

The eastern half of the island is a high plateau rising up to an elevation of 4,900 ft (1,500 m) on Kamakou peak and includes the 2,774-acre (11.23 km^{2}; 4.334 mi^{2}) Molokai Forest Reserve. The eastern half is covered with lush wet forests that get more than 300 in (7,600 mm) of rain per year. The high-elevation forests are populated by native ʻōhiʻa lehua (Metrosideros polymorpha) trees and an extremely diverse endemic flora and fauna in the understory. Much of the summit area is protected by the Nature Conservancy's Kamakou and Pelekunu valley preserves.

Below 4,000 ft (1,200 m), the vegetation is dominated by introduced and invasive flora, including strawberry guava (Psidium littorale), eucalyptus (Eucalyptus spp.), and cypress (Cupressus spp.). Introduced axis deer (Axis axis) and feral pigs (Sus scrofa) roam native forests, destroying native plants, expanding spreading invasive plants through disturbance and distribution of their seeds, and threatening endemic insects. Near the summit of Kamakou is the unique Pēpēʻōpae bog, where dwarf ʻōhiʻa and other plants cover the soggy ground.

Molokaʻi is home to a great number of endemic plant and animal species. However, many of its species, including the olomaʻo (Myadestes lanaiensis), kākāwahie (Paroreomyza flammea), and the Bishop's ‘ō‘ō (Moho bishopi) have become extinct. Molokaʻi is home to a wingless fly among many other endemic insects.

== History ==
It used to be thought that Molokaʻi was first settled around AD 650 by indigenous peoples most likely from the Marquesas Islands. However, a 2010 study using revised, high-precision radiocarbon dating based on more reliable samples has established that the period of eastern Polynesian colonization of the Marquesas Islands took place much later, in a shorter time frame of two waves: the "earliest in the Society Islands c. 1025–1120, four centuries later than previously assumed; then after 70 to 265 years, dispersal continued in one major pulse to all remaining islands c. 1190–1290." Later migrants likely came from Tahiti and other south Pacific islands.

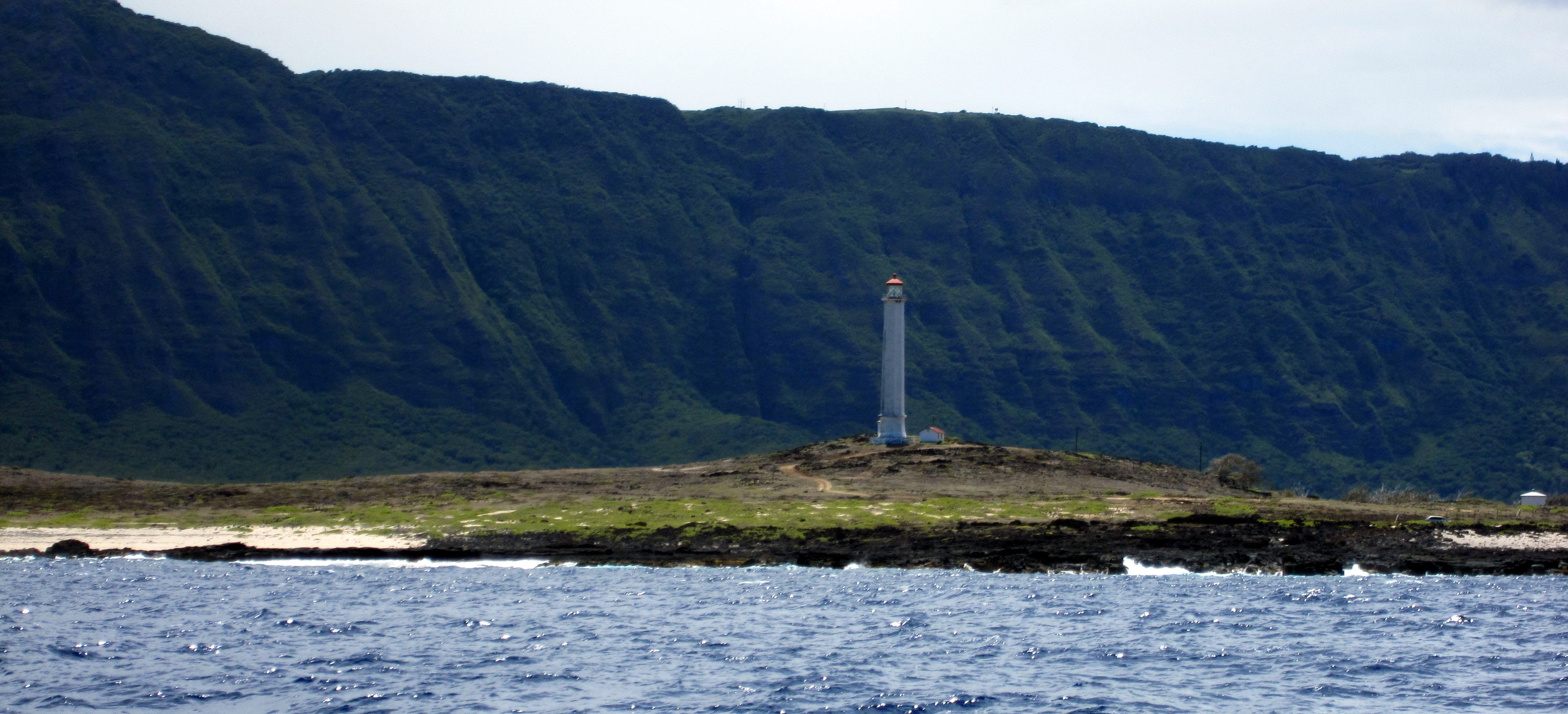
U.S. Coast Guard Molokaʻi Light, Kalaupapa Peninsula, northern shore of Molokaʻi. It is listed on the National Register of Historic Places.

Although Captain James Cook recorded sighting Molokaʻi in 1778, the first European sailor to visit the island was Captain George Dixon of the British Royal Navy in 1786. The first significant European influence came in 1832 when a Protestant mission was established at Kaluaʻaha on the East End of the island by the Reverend Harvey Hitchcock. The first farmer on Molokaʻi to grow, produce and mill sugar and coffee commercially was Rudolph Wilhelm Meyer, an immigrant from Germany who arrived in 1850. He built the first and only sugar mill on the island in 1878, which is now a museum.

Ranching began on Molokaʻi in the first half of the 19th century when King Kamehameha V set up a country estate on the island, which was managed by Meyer and became what is now the Molokai Ranch. In the late 1800s, Kamehameha V built a vacation home in Kaunakakai and ordered the planting of over 1,000 coconut trees in Kapuaiwa Coconut Grove.

The Malaysian businessman, Quek Leng Chan, possesses one-third of Molokai Island, previously known for its leprosy settlement, via his conglomerate, Hong Leong Group. Quek managed a large ranch on the island, which included a golf course and a hotel, until 2008 when he ceased operations after the state denied his development requests; the residents of the island are now attempting to repurchase the property.

=== Leper colony ===
Leprosy (also known as Hansen's disease) was introduced to the Hawaiian Islands by traders, sailors, workers and others who lived in societies where it was endemic. Sugar planters were worried about the effects on their labor force and pressured the government to take action to control the spread of leprosy.

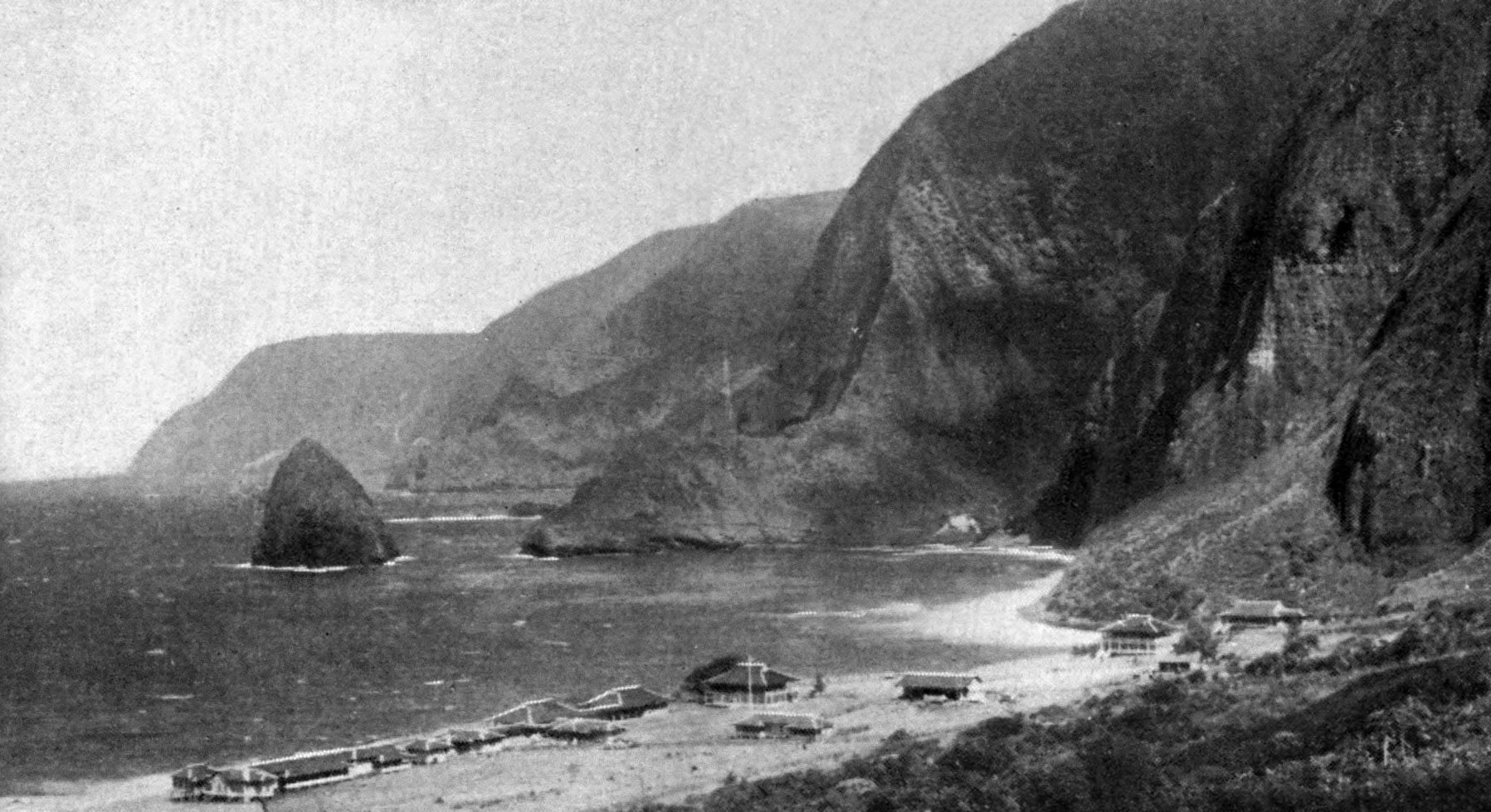
Leper colony 1907 on Molokaʻi

The legislature passed a control act requiring quarantine of people with leprosy. The government established Kalawao located on the isolated Kalaupapa peninsula on the northern side of Molokaʻi, followed by Kalaupapa as the sites of a leper colony that operated from 1866 to 1969. Because Kalaupapa had a better climate and sea access, it developed as the main community. A research hospital was developed at Kalawao. The population of these settlements reached a peak of 1,100 shortly after the beginning of the 20th century.

In total over the decades, more than 8,500 men, women and children living throughout the Hawaiian islands and diagnosed with leprosy were exiled to the colony by the Hawaiian government and declared legally dead. This public health measure was continued after the Kingdom became a U.S. territory. Patients were not allowed to leave the settlement nor have visitors and had to live out their days here.

Arthur Albert St. Mouritz served as a physician to the leper settlement from 1884 to 1887. He explained how leprosy was spread.

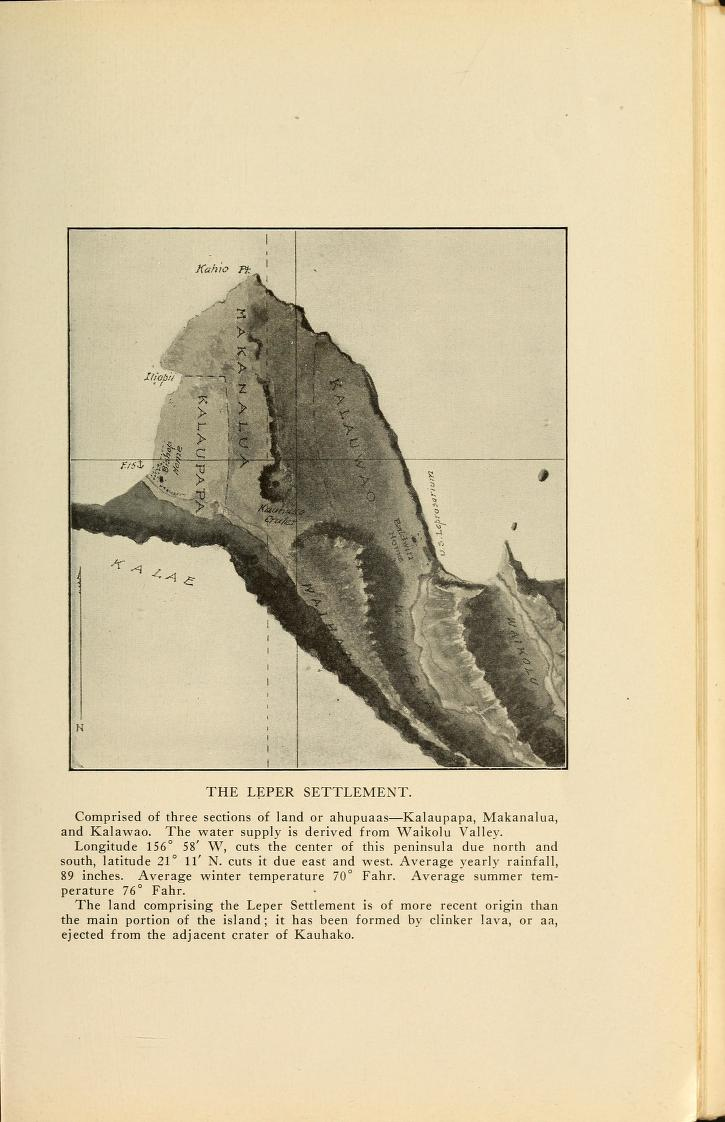
The Kalaupapa Leper Settlement

Pater Damiaan de Veuster (Father Damien), a Belgian priest of the Congregation of the Sacred Hearts of Jesus and Mary served as a missionary for 16 years in the communities of sufferers of leprosy. Joseph Dutton, who served in the 13th Wisconsin Volunteer Infantry Regiment during the American Civil War and converted to Roman Catholicism in 1883, came to Molokaʻi in 1886 to help Father Damien and the rest of the population who suffered from leprosy. Father Damien died at Kalaupapa in 1889 while Joseph Dutton died in Honolulu in 1931 at the age of 87. Mother Marianne Cope of the Sisters of Saint Francis of Syracuse, New York, brought six of her Sisters to work in Hawaiʻi with leprosy sufferers in the late 19th century, also serving on Molokaʻi.

Both Father Damien and Mother Marianne have been canonized as Saints by the Roman Catholic Church for their charitable work and devotion to sufferers of leprosy. In December 2015, the cause of Joseph Dutton was formally opened, obtaining him the title Servant of God.

In the 1920s, people confined in the leper colony were treated with a new method devised by Alice Ball and involving chaulmoogra oil. In the 1940s, sulfonamide drugs were developed and provided a more effective treatment. Antibiotic Dapsone has been used for leprosy since 1945. Modern Multidrug therapy (MDT) remains highly effective, and people are no longer infectious after the first monthly dose.

In 1969, the century-old laws of forced quarantine were abolished. Former patients living in Kalaupapa today have chosen to remain here, most for the rest of their lives. In the 21st century, there are no persons on the island with active cases of leprosy, which has been controlled through medication, but some former patients chose to continue to live in the settlement after its official closure.

== Economy ==
Over the years Molokai Ranch has also acted as a developer, establishing hotels and related amenities for resort tourists on their property. The local indigenous community fought for many decades to inhibit the development by Molokai Ranch in order to preserve their community and unique way of life. In some cases, protests have become violent, such as fence cutting, poisoning of the Ranch's exotic African Safari animals in 1994, an arson attack in Kaupoa in 1995, and the destruction of 5 mi (8 km) of Ranch water pipes in 1996.

In 2007, community residents organized the "Save Laʻau Point" movement to oppose Molokai Ranch's attempt to expand its resort operation. As a result, on March 24, 2008, Molokai Ranch, then the island's largest employer, decided to shut down all resort operations, including hotels, movie theater, restaurants, and golf course, and dismiss 120 workers. In September 2017 the company that owns Molokai Ranch, Singapore-based Guoco Leisure Ltd, put this 55,575-acre (22,490 ha) property, encompassing 35% of the island of Molokaʻi, on the market for $260 million. After years of neglect, residents have organized and formed the Molokai Heritage Trust to determine how to eventually buy back the land, return it to the stewardship of the local community, and protect it from exploitation.

Due in large part to the fight against development and tourism, Molokaʻi has Hawaii's highest unemployment rate. The residents have fought hard to maintain a lifestyle based on indigenous subsistence practices. This lifestyle is not without challenges, however, and many live below the federal poverty line. One third of its residents use food stamps. As of 2014, the largest industry on the island is seed production for Monsanto and Mycogen Seeds, including GMO seeds.

=== Tourism ===
Papalaua Falls

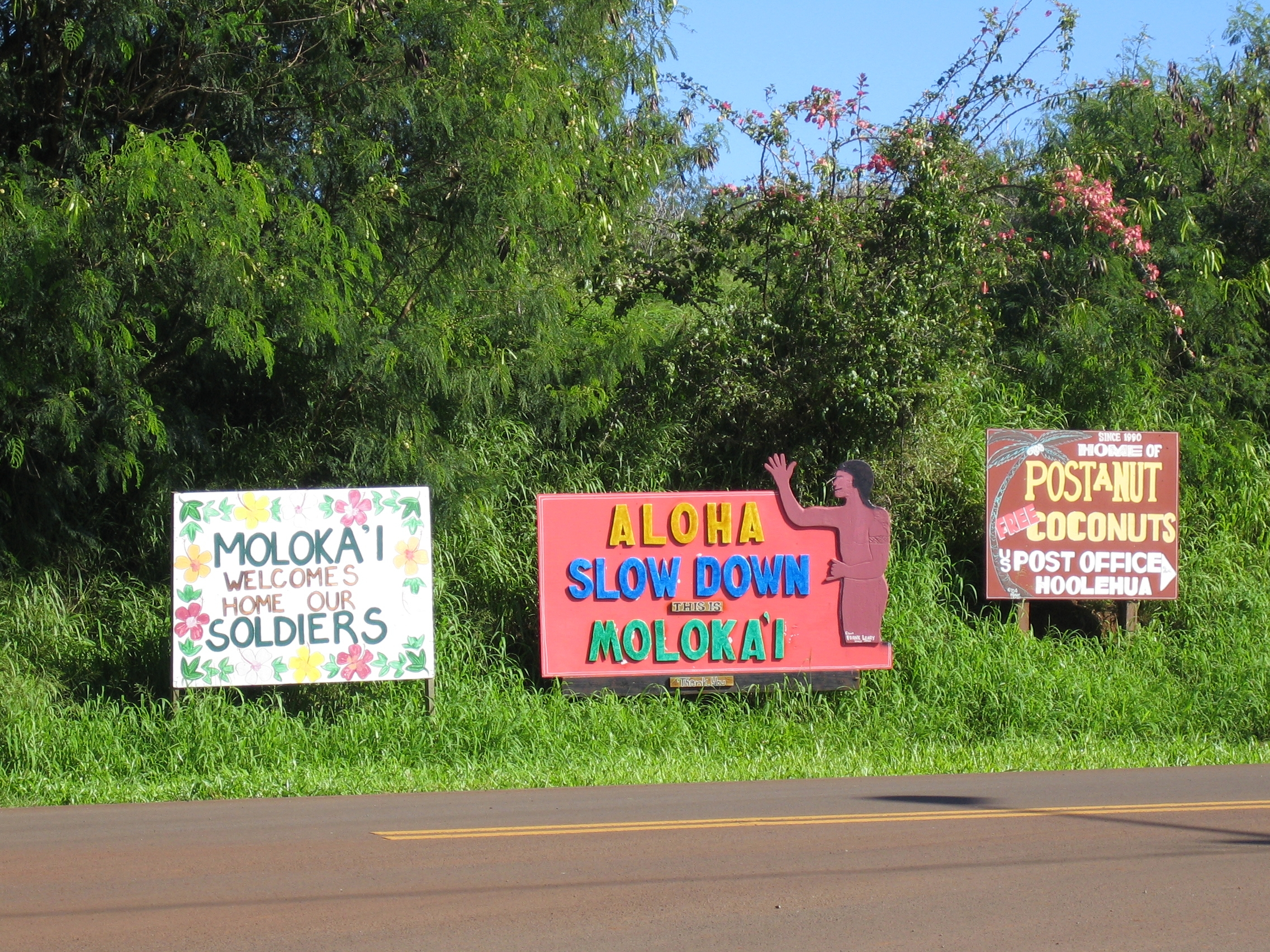
Sign greeting visitors to Molokaʻi at exit to Molokai Airport

The tourism industry on Molokaʻi is relatively small, compared to the other islands in Hawaiʻi. Only 64,767 tourists visited Molokaʻi in 2015. For decades, residents of Molokaʻi have resisted private developers' attempts to increase tourism because of the irreparable changes to community and culture that are associated with a tourism industry. Accommodations are limited; as of 2014, only one hotel was open on the island. Most tourists find lodgings at rental condos and houses.

National Geographic Traveler magazine and the National Geographic Center for Sustainable Destinations conduct annual Destination Scorecard surveys, aided by George Washington University. In 2007, a panel of 522 experts in sustainable tourism and destination stewardship reviewed 111 selected human-inhabited islands and archipelagos around the world. Molokaʻi ranked 10th among the 111 destination locales. The survey cited Molokaʻi's undeveloped tropical landscape, environmental stewardship, and rich, deep Hawaiian traditions (the island's mana). The neighbor islands of Hawaiʻi, Kauaʻi, Maui and Oʻahu, ranked 50, 61, 81 and 104, respectively.

Molokaʻi is believed to be the birthplace of the hula. The annual Molokaʻi Ka Hula Piko festival is held on this island.

Molokaʻi can be reached by plane. Planes fly into Molokaʻi daily from other Hawaiian islands including Oʻahu (Honolulu and Kalaeloa), Maui (Kahului) and Hawaii (Kona), operated by Mokulele Airlines, Paragon Air and Hawaiian Airlines.

A ferry that formerly sailed between Molokaʻi and Lāhainā Harbor, Maui closed operations on October 27, 2016. Sea Link President and Senior Capt. Dave Jung attributed the closure to competition from federally subsidized commuter air travel and declining ridership.

== Infrastructure ==
=== Health care ===
The island of Molokaʻi is served by Molokaʻi General Hospital, which operates all day, every day. It is also serviced by Molokai Community Health Center. Transfers to medical facilities on Oahu are arranged as necessary.

=== Education ===
All areas of the state of Hawaii are in one school district: Hawaii State Department of Education.

The island public school system includes four elementary schools, one charter school, one middle school, and one high school, Molokaʻi High School. There is also a community college. The island has one private middle/high school.

The Hawaii State Public Library System operates the Molokai Public Library in Kaunakakai.

=== Parks ===
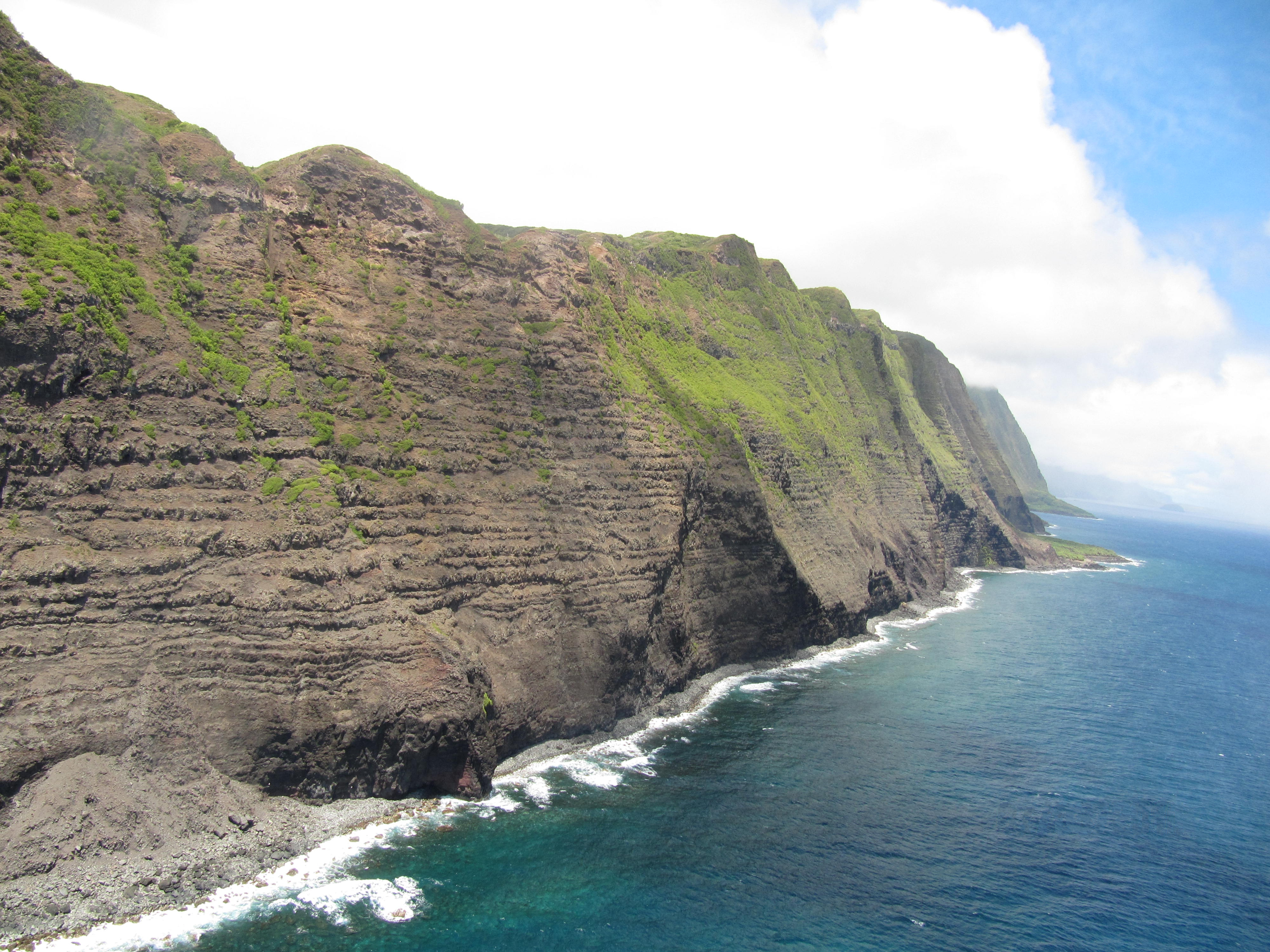
Sea Cliffs on the island's northern side

The island contains many parks and other protected areas, but most parks do not have service staff, potable water, or restroom facilities. Parks within the Maui County parks jurisdiction include Palaʻau State Park, Kiowea Beach Park, Kakahaiʻa National Wildlife Refuge, Molokaʻi Forest Reserve, Pelekunu Preserve, George Murphy Beach Park, Hālawa Beach Park, and Papohaku Beach Park (with a 2 mi [3.2 km] beach) in the portion within Maui County. Today Kalawao County is preserved by the Kalaupapa National Historical Park (accessible by guided mule or hiking tour).

== Transportation ==
=== Highways ===
The island can be traversed by a two-lane highway running east to west: Highway 460 (Maunaloa Highway) from the west side town of Maunaloa to Kaunakakai, and Highway 450 (King Kamehameha V Highway) from Kaunakakai to the Hālawa Beach Park. Highway 470 is a spur up to the barrier mountains of Kalawao County and the Kalaupapa peninsula. By land this area (Kalaupapa) can only be reached by a hiking trail. Mule rides on the trail were suspended in 2018 when the trail temporarily closed due to a landslide and bridge damage. Most access to the Kalaupapa peninsula is by sea.

=== Bus ===
Maui Economic Opportunity operates public transportation on Molokaʻi.

== Notable people ==
- Mother Marianne Cope, 19th-century nun and saint
- Father Damien de Veuster, 19th-century Catholic priest and saint
- Joseph Dutton, Catholic missionary who worked with Father Damien
- Peter Johnson Gulick, Protestant missionary
- Harvey Rexford Hitchcock, Protestant missionary
- Harvey Rexford Hitchcock, Jr., 1913 College Football All-America Team
- John S. K. Kauwe III – Biologist and president of Brigham Young University–Hawaii
- Melveen Leed, singer
- Linda Lingle, 6th Governor of Hawaiʻi
- Keith Luuloa, professional baseball player (Anaheim Angels)
- Rudolph Wilhelm Meyer, politician and agricultural businessman in Hawaiʻi
- William Ragsdale, popular Hawaiian attorney and politician, who served as superintendent at Kalaupapa for four years (1874–1878)
- Arthur Albert St. Mouritz, physician to the leper settlement in Molokaʻi from 1884 to 1887. He explained how leprosy was spread.
- Kirby Wright, poet and writer
- Lois-Ann Yamanaka, poet and novelist

=== Royalty ===
- Nuʻakea, High Chiefess of Molokaʻi
- Hualani, High Chiefess of Molokaʻi
- Keʻoloʻewa, High Chief of Molokaʻi
- Kapau-a-Nuʻakea, Chiefess of Molokaʻi
- Kamauliwahine, Lady of Molokaʻi
- Kanipahu, High Chief of Molokaʻi
- Kamauaua, High Chief of Molokaʻi
- Kahokuohua, High Chief of Molokaʻi
- Kalanipehu, High Chief of Molokaʻi
- Kaneʻalai, High Chiefess and Queen Regnant of Molokaʻi in the 18th century

== Towns and villages ==
- Hoʻolehua
- Kalaupapa
- Kalawao
- Kaunakakai
- Kualapuʻu
- Maunaloa
- ʻUalapuʻe
- Hālawa

== See also ==
- Alii Aimoku of Molokai
- Father Damien of Molokai
- National Register of Historic Places listings in Hawaii#Molokai
- Koolau the Leper, a short story by Jack London
