= History of Maui =

History of an island in the Hawaiian Islands

Location within the island chain

The island of Maui with a relatively central location has given it a pivotal role in the history of the Hawaiian Islands.

== Legend ==
According to legends, the hero Māui lived at Kaʻuiki, across the bay from Hana. He caught the islands of Hawaii on a fishing trip with his magical fishing hook, but failed to pull them all together when his brothers quit paddling the canoe in which they were voyaging, so the islands were left spread apart from each other. Māui was later persuaded by his grandmother to slow the sun down, so she could grow more food and dry her tapa cloth. Māui agreed to help, so he stood on the summit of Mount Haleakala and lassoed the sun's ray legs and broke them off one by one, threatening to kill him if he didn't slow down. The sun obliged.

Maui legends include the magical deeds of the Menehune. Scholars disagree as to the origin of Menehune stories. One theory is that the stories were borrowed from European brownie and pixie stories told by sailors or settlers. Another theory is that the Menehune actually were the descendants of Hawaii's earliest settlers from the Marquesas who were pushed into the forest by Tahitian newcomers. The Tahitian word 'manahune' refers to low-class workers who did the most menial tasks which, the theory goes, the second-class original settlers were forced to perform. In time the Menehune became legendary and were given magical powers to help the helpless and to punish evil actions. A third possible explanation is that the Menehune were later, non-Tahitian immigrants who were not permitted to live with or intermarry with descendants of Tahitians.

== Early settlement ==
The date when Polynesians first settled the island of Maui is uncertain. Early archaeological studies suggested that they came in multiple gradual waves, the earliest possibly from the Marquesas sometime before 450 AD., and the most recent from Tahiti sometime after 700 AD. Under this theory, the Tahitian arrivals introduced the core pieces of Hawaiian traditional culture: language, economic activities, the hereditary class system, land tenure, religion, and customs such as the strict kapu system that affected all aspects of life. However, later analyses suggest that the first settlers did not arrive until 900–1200 CE. Hawaiian oral tradition lists an unbroken chain of twenty-five rulers (the Moʻi of Maui) beginning with Paumakua the first Ali'i Nui of Maui.

Maui's oldest known temple enclosures (heiaus) are at Halekiʻi and Pihana from about 1200. The structures were, according to legend, built by the Menehune in a single night from stones on Paukukalo Beach. More likely they began as small structures and were expanded as the prestige of the Wailuku grew. The last additions were thought to have been made by King Kahekili. Pihana, also called Pihanakilani and Piʻihana, was a luakini where human sacrifice was carried out. According to accounts written by outsiders, victims were most often kapu breakers or war captives.

=== Chiefdoms ===
Until the 15th century Maui comprised three chiefdoms: Wailuku, Lele (Lahaina), and Hana. Eventually all of West Maui was consolidated at Wailuku, with Hana remaining an independent chieftaincy. West Maui and East Maui permanently merged about 1550 when King Piʻilani married the daughter of Hoʻolae, the 6th Aliʻi Nui of Hana. From that time until conquest Maui was ruled by a single joint royal family (Hawaiian: aliʻi). Piʻilani and his successors were known for the peace and prosperity that followed. They constructed a highway that circled the island along its coast; remnants of which still exist. They also built the island's and Hawaii's largest temple enclosure. Today it is called Piʻilanihale, built on an older temple site from about 1294. It is about 40 feet (12 m) high and 300 feet (91 m) long. Other heiau were constructed at Olowalu and Waianapanapa.

=== Heiau and other structures ===
Many ancient structures on Maui are named in story but no longer survive. There was a fort at Ka'uiki Head at Hana which was the scene of several battles between chiefdoms on Maui or invasions from Hawaii. The last battle occurred when King Kahekili fought off a Hawaiian raid in the 1780s. On a small island at the tip of Kaʻuiki Head a huge statue of Kawalakii was erected by King Umi of Hana to frighten off would-be invaders. The Hauola Stone in Lahaina Harbor was believed to have healing qualities; it is still there. Extensive archaeological research has been undertaken at Kahikinui on Maui's southeast coast. Several heiau have been located, as well as villages, and fields. Heiau in the Wailuku area include: Keahuku, Olokua, Olopia, Malena, Pohakuokahi, Lelemako, Kawelowelo, Kaulupala, Palamnaihiki, and Oloolokalani. There were at least three additional heiau between Kahului Harbor and Wailuku. There is a partially collapsed heiau at Keoneʻoʻio (La Perouse Bay.) In several parts of the island small shrines were set up, usually a single or cluster of standing stones where fishermen could pray and give offerings. Rarely walled canoe 'sheds' are still preserved. The Ke'anae Peninsula's taro field system is a prehistoric field system still in use.

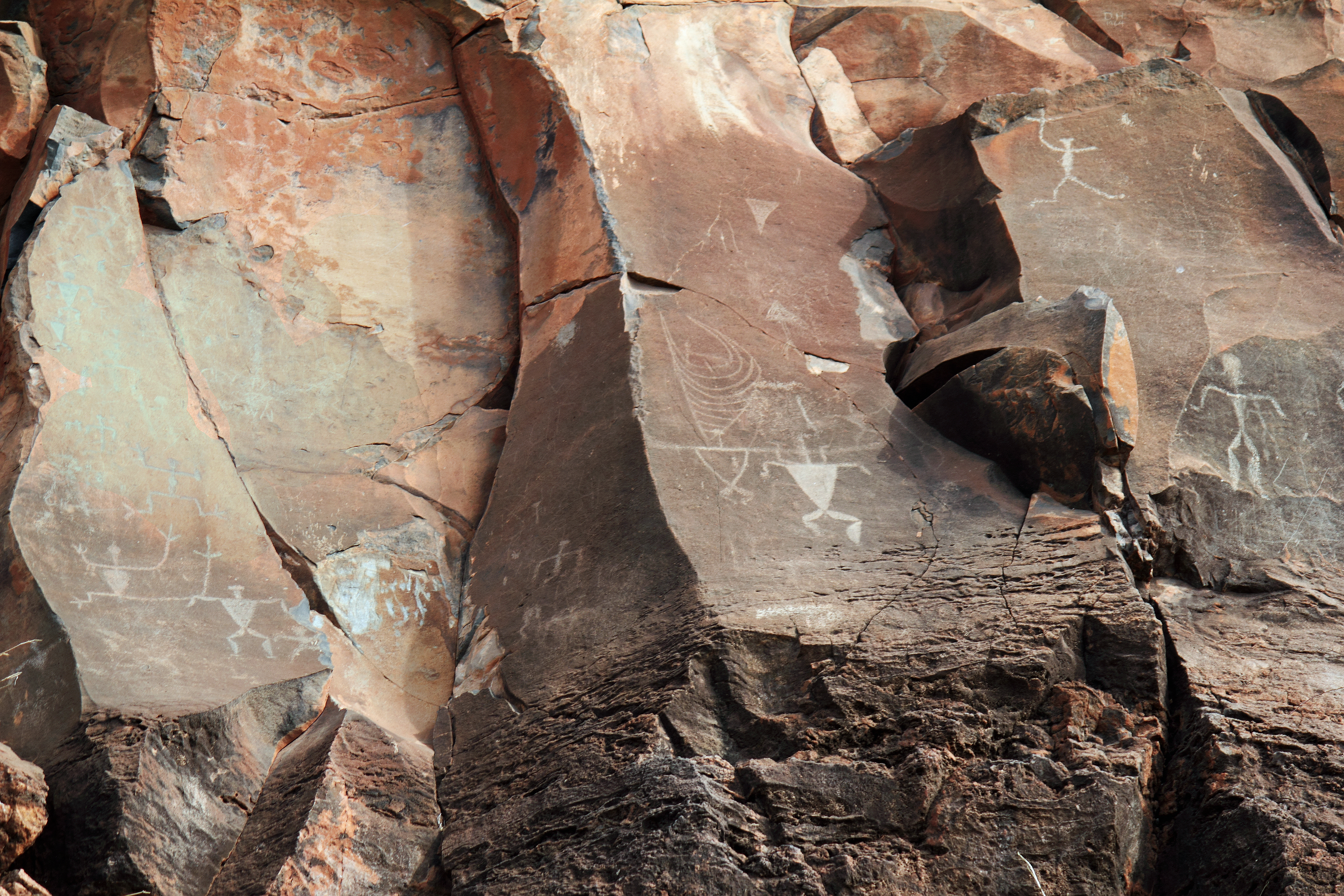
Olowalu Petroglyphs

Maui has several petroglyph sites that have been variously interpreted as ancestral voyages, historic events, and religious stories. One of the best remaining sites is in the cliffs above Olowalu. Nearby Maʻalea had an extensive panel which was destroyed by a developer. Kaupo has little 'footprints' across a lava flow said to be the prints of Menehune. The Kula area has several sites on private land. There are some at Nuʻu as well. Vandalism to these sites has led to their closure or limited access to permit holders.

=== Land tenure ===
The twelve traditional mokus of Maui.

Hawaiians developed a complex and effective land tenure system. The island of Maui was divided into twelve districts (Hawaiian: moku). with Lanaʻi, Molokaʻi, Kahoʻolawe constituted their own districts or were subdivided into many other districts. Each district was ruled from earliest times by a family and later by a chief's family. Each moku was divided into many community units (Hawaiian: ahupuaʻa) which ran from the top of the mountain to the ocean in a roughly triangular shape ruled by subchiefs. Boundaries were natural features such as streams, rock outcrops, or forest. Each community unit was subdivided into extended family units (Hawaiian: ʻili) that also ran from the mountains to the ocean, so each family had access to mountain forests, uplands, coast plains for farming, and ocean.

Each district had a sanctuary (Hawaiian: puʻuhonua) to escape vengeance or penalty. Maui's sanctuary was located at Kukuipuka on Maui's west side near Waiheʻe. After fleeing there, making restitution and waiting a period of time, the offender could return home. During warfare, women, children, and elders could go there and not be harmed.

=== Kapu society ===
The social system was called the kapu system. According to legend the system was brought to the islands from Tahiti by the priest Paʻao perhaps as early as 1300. The kapu system was rooted in the class system and religious practice. People were born into one of four ranks. At the top were the aliʻi. Next were the kahuna, those of priestly rank who conducted religious ritual ceremonies, served as spiritual advisers, and healers. The third rank were makaʻaina, the commoners who worked the farms, built canoes, gathered wood, fished and performed labor. The fourth rank, kauwa or outcasts, were outside the system and lived outside the community much like 'untouchables' in traditional Hindu society.

There were three main kapu (rule) types: fixed kapu, flexible kapu, and temporary kapu. Examples of fixed kapu were the complete separation of men and women at meals and that menstruating women had to live outside the household. Other fixed kapu related to the aliʻi which set them apart from commoners and maintained their status in a society with few material possessions. Flexible kapu could be altered by the local chief. For example, certain kinds of fish could not be caught at certain times of the year. Temporary kapus were invoked for a period of days. For example, following a funeral, no one could fish for a period of time. The effect was to maintain order in the community. Kapu also conserved the environment by protecting plants and wildlife from overuse. The result of the kapu system was to preserve the mana or sacredness of the totality of the environment which would bring about peace, harmony and stability. Kapu breakers disrupted the mana and jeopardized the entire community.

== Early European encounters ==
=== Castaways ===
Oral tradition indicates that castaways, most likely Spanish, shipwrecked on the islands sometime between 1521 and 1530. Versions of this story are found on Hawaiʻi, Kauaʻi, and Maui. In the Maui version several white men and a woman were shipwrecked during the reign of King Kakaalaneo at Kiwi near Waihee. The captain's Hawaiian name was Kukanaloa. The men married, had families, and became ancestors of some of the chiefs.

Spanish ships sailed between Asia and Mexico or South America regularly. Analysis of documents purporting to record a 'discovery' of Hawaii by Manuel Gaetan in 1555 show that whatever islands he noted in his log were too far east to have been any of Hawaii's main islands.

=== Captain Cook ===
On November 26, 1778, Captain James Cook became the first European explorer to see Maui. Cook never set foot on the island because he was unable to find a suitable landing. The first European to visit Maui was the French admiral Jean-François de Galaup, comte de La Pérouse, who landed on the shores of what is now known as La Perouse Bay on May 29, 1786.

=== Simon and Thomas Metcalfe ===
In 1790 an American maritime fur trader, Simon Metcalfe, anchored his ship, the Eleanora south of Lahaina. During the night, a Hawaiian named Kaopuiki and several accomplices killed a guard and cut the ships's cutter loose and ran it ashore. The next morning when the incident was discovered, Captain Metcalfe fired his cannon into the closest village and kidnapped several Hawaiians who told him that people from the village of Olowalu were responsible. Metcalfe moved his ship to Olowalu only to discover the village under a kapu for three days while the local chief celebrated a family occasion. As soon as the three days were over canoes from Olowalu flocked toward Metcalfe's ship to trade. Metcalfe, feigning peaceful intentions, waved the canoes around to his ship's landward side and then ordered broadsides of ball and shot fired at point-blank range, which blasted the vessels to pieces. About one hundred Hawaiians were killed and several hundred wounded.

Metcalfe then sailed to Hawaii and, at Kealakekua Bay, began what seemed to be friendly intercourse with the natives. Around the same time Metcalfe's son, Thomas Humphrey Metcalfe, arrived in the Hawaiian Islands, at Kawaihae Bay, in command of the Fair American, a small schooner owned by his father. His voyage to the Hawaiian Islands had been delayed because the Fair American and its crew had been seized by the Spanish Navy during the Nootka Crisis. The younger Metcalfe's vessel was captured by Chief Kameʻeiamoku, who had been insulted and flogged by Simon Metcalfe earlier that year. Kameʻeiamoku had vowed to exact revenge on whatever ship next came his way, and by chance that ship turned out to be the Fair American. Thomas Metcalfe and the entire crew were killed except for Isaac Davis, who Kameʻeiamoku sent as a captive to Kamehameha along with guns and cannons taken from the Fair American. Another American from Simon Metcalfe's ship, John Young, was also captured to prevent Metcalfe from hearing about his son's murder. The two Americans, Young and Davis, commanded the cannons at the bloody battle of Kepaniwai.

== Unification of the islands ==
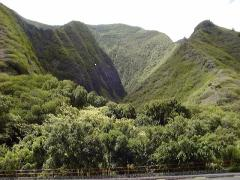
ʻĪao Valley

In the late 18th century, Hawaii underwent a series of wars in which Maui changed hands multiple times, and which culminated with the unification of the Hawaiian islands. Sometime around the time of Captain Cook's first visit, King Kalaniʻōpuʻu of Hawaii briefly conquered Maui's Hana District from King Kahekili II, but was pushed out around 1781.

In the following years, Maui became more of a regional power, as Kahekili took control of Oahu and Molokai from King Kahahana and formed an alliance with his half-brother, King Kāʻeokūlani of Kauai.

Maui was again invaded from Hawaii in 1790 this time by Kamehameha I (Hawaiian pronunciation: [kəmehəˈmɛhə]; ca. 1758 – May 8, 1819). Kahekili was on Oahu at the time, and his son Kalanikūpule proved no match for Kamehameha's forces. Kamehameha swept across the island, cornering and slaughtering Maui's forces in the ʻĪao Valley in the Wailuku District. Kalanikūpule escaped to Oahu and warned Kahekili; Kahekili and Kāʻeokūlani launched a counter-invasion the next year that succeeded in driving Kamehameha out of Maui but failed to win any territory on Hawaii.

Kahekili and Kāʻeokūlani died in 1793 and 1794, respectively, emboldening Kamehameha to invade once more. Kamehameha again took Maui and Molokai, and this time went on to conquer Oahu as well, killing Kalanikūpule. He came to control Kauai through diplomacy in 1810, and thus formally established the Kingdom of Hawaii. By developing alliances with the major Pacific colonial powers, Kamehameha preserved Hawaii's independence under his rule. Kamehameha is remembered for many reasons and one is the Kanawai Mamalahoe, the "Law of the Splintered Paddle", which protects human rights of non-combatants in times of battle.

== Trade with Europe and China ==
=== Sandalwood ===
The first trading encounters with Europeans were independent businessmen on ships trading goods with China. Hawaiians had little with which to purchase goods except for foods and livestock, until the traders found Hawaiian sandalwood trees, that were valuable in China for incense. King Kamehameha tightly controlled contact with foreigners and centralized the sandalwood trade under his personal oversight in 1805. The resource was limited, however, and by the 1830s sandalwood became so scarce that logging stopped.

=== Whaling ===
Whaling ships plied the Pacific along the coast of Peru and Japan as early as 1818. Hawaii sat directly between the two. Lahaina and Honolulu became the main Pacific ports for the north Pacific whaling fleet. Since Lahaina had no real harbor, ships anchored in the Lahaina Roads off Maui's southwest coast for shore leave. By 1824 more than 100 ships visited Lahaina a year. As Hawaii's capital, it quickly drew enterprising immigrants who opened taverns, brothels, inns, and shops. Hawaiians paddled out to the ships to trade fresh fruit and produce for trinket trade goods such a beads, mirrors, metal implements, and cloth. At its height in the 1850s more than 400 whaling ships a year visited Lahaina.

Whaling ships tended to stay several weeks rather than days which explains complaints about the drinking and prostitution in the town at that time. Whaling declined steeply at the end of the 19th century as kerosene and electricity replaced whale oil for lighting.

Hawaiians also began to plant many types of crops which were introduced to the islands: coffee, potatoes, sugarcane from which rum could be distilled, pineapples and rice. Sailors were introduced to the art of tattoos.

=== Destruction of traditional life ===
The introduction of outsiders began the erosion of the class, kapu and religious systems. Even before Christian missionaries arrived in force, the system was weakened by decades of civil war among the island chiefs, foreign residents who did not fit into the system, and the introduction of new ideas about society, religion and government. The kapu system, human sacrifice and caste system in the islands appalled European visitors who condemned the entire culture. The rulers of Maui were influenced by visitors and the religious and social system was further weakened. Ultimately, the aliʻi themselves ended the kapu and traditional religion. They could not foresee that by doing so they had weakened the foundations of their own power.

Hawaiians were exposed to the Europeans' communicable diseases, including enteric, viral, and venereal infections. A series of epidemics killed up to 95% of the residents, destroying the social and cultural fabric of traditional Hawaiian life.

== The new religion ==
When Kamehameha I died in 1819, Queen Kaʻahumanu declared herself a co-ruler with his son Kamehameha II. She challenged many of the conventions of Hawaiian society, ending the kapu system. Heiau were destroyed, images burned or broken, and priests chased away. This threw the religious life of Hawaiians into confusion. Within two years the first Christian missionaries appeared, just as Hawaiians lost confidence in their traditional religion and social system.

=== Early missionaries ===
The first Christian missionary arrived on Maui from New England in 1821 when a Dr. Holman built a house in Lahaina and taught with some success, later moving to Honolulu. The missionaries developed a written version of the Hawaiian Language. Among others, Hiram Bingham I employed Latin letters that approximated Hawaiian sounds in English. The only exception was the ʻokina, a glottal stop, which precedes some vowels in many Hawaiian words. The result was a twelve letter alphabet with additional vowel combinations. The first literature in Hawaiian was printed in 1822. By 1826 the final version had evolved by simplifying interchangeable letters b/p, k/t, l/r, v/w and eliminating several letter used only in writing foreign words. Hawaiians learned to read rapidly in their own language.

In late May 1823 Reverends William Richards and Charles Stewart and their wives from the Congregational and Presbyterian American Board of Commissioners for Foreign Missions (ABCFM) opened a mission at Lāhainā at the invitation of Queen Kaʻahumanu. Richards was permitted to build a stone house on the present site of Campbell Park in downtown Lahaina. He gradually left missionary service and became a legal advisor, diplomatic envoy and Hawaiian Minister of Education. He drew up Hawaii's first constitution. Stewart remained in the islands for two and a half years, but when his wife became ill, he returned to New England. He kept a journal of his experiences which has become an important source for the time period. Betsy Stockton, an emancipated slave, came with the Stewarts and began to teach ordinary Hawaiians. Her efforts resulted in the first classes for commoners on Maui and by the time she left in 1825 with the Stewarts, she had taught 8,000 Hawaiians. The missionaries set up a printing shop and began printing bibles and educational materials which supplied schools throughout the islands. The first stone church was built in 1828 at Lahaina called Waiola Church. The churchyard there contains the remains of many early foreigners and Hawaiians, among them, Queen Keōpūolani, the first royalty converted to Christianity, and Queen Kaʻahumanu. In 1831 the Lahainaluna Mission School, later Lahainaluna Seminary was established, publishing Hawaiian language bibles, and educational materials.

The early missionaries came into direct conflict with whalers when they attempted to keep sailors out of the bawdy houses and to stop Hawaiian women from visiting the ships. In 1825 a crew attempted to demolish Richards' house for his efforts to keep Hawaiians and Americans apart. A small fort was built at Lahaina after a whaling ship, John Palmer fired its cannon after an altercation with missionaries about women visiting ships. Reconstructed remains of the fort can still be seen. The missionaries both altered and preserved the native culture. The new religious teachings and strict Victorian ideas altered many aspects of Maui's culture while their literacy efforts preserved native history and language for posterity.

=== Spread of Christianity ===
In the early 1830s a second wave of missionaries arrived and established churches in other parts of Maui. A congregation was established at Wailuku sometime before 1831 by Pastors Jonathan Green and Reuben Tinker. The minutes of the ABCFM gives an insight into the swift conversion of Hawaiians: "Until recently the chiefs have been regarded as something more than mortal. So when the chiefs are motivated by the Holy Ghost to embrace Christianity, their advice to join it has the force of law. So if told to attend or study, they did so." Pastors reported attendance at Wailuku on Sundays of 3,000 by 1832. By 1870 Hawaiian churches had been established in 13 locations throughout Maui and all of them with Hawaiian pastors trained at the Lahainaluna Seminary. The missionaries taught Hawaiians and began writing the islands' history, which until then existed only as oral accounts.

Missionaries believed they were "civilizing" Hawaiians. They tried to help Hawaiians become literate in their own language and English, and decrease drunkenness, sexual promiscuity, infanticide (exposing disabled children), gambling, theft, and murder. They attempted to replace Hawaiians' own religion with basic Protestant Christianity. They also introduced American notions about customs involving clothing, food, language, entertainment, education, hygiene and economy.

== 18th century ==
In 1750 the last eruption on Mount Haleakala may have occurred from two vents on the south flank at Keoneʻoʻio above La Perouse Bay. It caused the abandonment of several villages at Keoneʻoʻio.

After insulting Kamehameha I, Princess Kaukoʻoluaole was ordered to be sacrificed at Pihana after the defeat of Kalanikupule in 1790. Poloahilani, a foster-sister of the princess, was sent to be sacrificed in the princess' place; the last time the heiau was used for that purpose. (Pihana was ordered destroyed in 1819 as part of a campaign against the old religion upon the death of Kamehameha I.) Near Pihana was a warrior training camp at Kauahea.

Also in 1790 Kamehameha I set about to wrest control of the islands from Kahekili. With about 1,200 warriors and cannons and guns taken from Metcalf, Kamehameha invaded. He defeated Prince Kalanikupule in the ʻĪao Valley west of Wailuku. The name of the battle denotes the "damming of the stream" by the bodies of the warriors killed. Kalanikupule and his chiefs escaped by climbing the pali and escaping to Oahu.

Kamehameha gained ultimate control of Maui in 1794 when he defeated King Kalanikupule's army at the battle of Nu'uanu on Oahu. Kalanikupule was sacrificed to Kamehameha's war god at Papaenena heiau, built by Kahekili at the base of Diamond Head above Waikiki. With his death the Kingdom of Maui ended. In 1798 Kamehameha began a brick palace in European fashion as his capitol, but Queen Kaʻahumnu refused to live in it when it was completed in 1802. Successive rulers lived there until the 1840s when the king and his advisors began to spend more time in Honolulu.

== 19th century ==
When the people of Maui came into contact with diseases for which they had no immunity and no effective treatment, they began to die in vast numbers. Smallpox, measles, influenza, tuberculosis, cholera, typhus, typhoid fever and sexually transmitted diseases decimated the population. Estimates range from 30% to 50% of the population died within a generation. The effect was catastrophic on the culture of Maui. The Hawaiian social system fell apart and outsiders filled the power vacuum.

=== Catholicism ===
Father Aubert of the Congregation of Mary and Jesus arrived in Lahaina in 1846 to establish the first Catholic parish on Maui. He and his early congregants faced opposition from the Protestant missionaries, but the welcoming attitude of Hawaiians soon replaced initial hostility. Father Aubert's first meeting places were open air and under thatched roofs. An adobe church, Maria Lanikula (Victorious Saint Mary) was built in downtown Lahaina.

In 1882 Father Beissel arrived at Makawao. In 1894 he completed the Holy Ghost Mission Catholic Church at Kula, serving a growing Portuguese population of cane workers.

=== Leprosy ===
In 1860 and 1861 church leaders on Maui noticed a significant increase in leprosy (Hansen's Disease) cases. Citizens became alarmed at what they thought might be an epidemic. A doctor in Hana told the Board of Health that in Canada and the patients were isolated from the general population, provided with food and clothing until they recovered or died. In 1864 Dr. William Hillebrand suggested a place such as a box canyon be found where lepers could be quarantined. A hospital at Kalihi on Oahu was used as a gathering place where those infected presented themselves for inspection. Those with leprosy were quarantined. Kalihi was only a temporary solution.

Property was purchased on the isolated north coast of Molokaʻi at Kalaupapa where lepers would have no outside contact. By December 1865 the "Leper Colony" was ready. Once the colony was established, those determined to have leprosy were forced to move there. Kalihi initially sent 104 people to the island. This was complicated because ships could not get close to the beach. Patients were initially shuttled to shore by whaleboats, which was dangerous and terrifying to infectees who had already suffered separation by force from friends and families. Eventually, they were forced over the side at gunpoint to swim through the surf. Patients were marched across the peninsula to Kalawao where they found huts and tiny cottages purchased for them in near ruin.

Father Joseph Damien became the pastor of the leper colony, working from St. Philomena Catholic Church, until his death in 1893. Father Damien saw the difficulty of those afflicted by leprosy and was called to help them even though he was aware of the diseases communicability. He traveled regularly back to other island to report his work at Kalaupapa to the Catholic Diocese of Hawaii and miraculously did not catch leprosy for decades. Eventually, however, the signs of leprosy were spotted by the Diocese during one of his reports and he returned to Kalaupapa permanently. He provided the colony with support of all kinds until his death of leprosy a year later. His kindness and love will be remembered by the people of Hawaii for all time. His acts have recently been recognized by the Catholic Church and he has become canonized Saint Damien. The courage and service of his life and work among those suffering from Hansen's disease have inspired Hawaiians and others for generations.

=== Great Mahele land redistribution ===
By 1848 land rights had become so hopelessly confused that a land redistribution scheme, known as the Great Mahele, was established. Most Hawaiians lost their hereditary land rights. Sugar interests bought land and changed the economy of the island completely. Many native Hawaiians went to work in the cane fields instead of their own family small holdings.

=== Agriculture ===
==== Sugar cane ====
By the 1840s sugarcane production had gained a foothold via what became known as the plantation system. Descendants of the old missionary families went into various businesses and used their close connections to Hawaiian royalty to arrange special concessions, including land ownership. Early planters tried to make a profit with small holdings; larger companies consolidated plantations.

Alexander & Baldwin (A&B) at Pāʻia was an early success. The Alexander and Baldwin plantation at Pāʻia stretched as far west as the ancient landing site where Kamehameha's war fleet landed in 1790. The plantation needed a port facility so a dock was built.

Kuau was a seaport one mile northeast of Paia. Kuau Bay and Kuau Cove lie offshore.

==== Immigrant workers ====
Since there were not enough native workers to cultivated the acreage, planters began importing Asian contract workers. The plan was for workers to stay for a period of time and then return home. The first workers came from China, arriving in 1852. To counter the tightly organized Chinese workers, thousands of Japanese laborers came to Maui starting in 1868. Koreans followed in 1903, and Filipinos in 1909. Between 1878 and 1911, nearly 16,000 Portuguese people immigrated to Maui. They came mostly from the Madeira and Azores Islands of Portugal, and included many entire families.

Conditions on the plantations were terrible and the system ensured that workers always owed more than they had earned at the end of the season. Workers were more like indentured servants than contract laborers. About half the contract laborers returned to their homelands; the rest stayed to live on the islands. These immigrants forever altered the food, language, customs, and population of Maui. The imposition of the plantation system effectively disenfranchised the remaining native population of Maui. Foreign corporations and local bosses became the power behind the government of the Kingdom of Hawaii.

==== Water ====
In 1876 A&B Sugar Company decided to bring water from the north side of Maui to the arid south central plain. They had a lease from the government of Hawaii on the condition that the ditch be built within two years. The East Maui Irrigation System still controls water from the slopes of Haleakala. This stimulated a competitor, Claus Spreckels owner of the Hawaiian Commercial and Sugar Company (HC&S). Spreckels received a second lease to any water not captured by A&B. A third competitor, Maui Agricultural Company (MA) expanded alongside the others. A sugar mill at Hamakuapoko (near Paia) was built in 1879 to process Maui's increasing amounts of cane.

In 1878 the need for improved transportation from sugarcane plantations to the port at Kahului caused Thomas Hobron to build Maui's first narrow gauge railroad. Operation commenced in July 1879 between the tiny landing at Kahului and Wailuku; it was formally named the Kahului Railroad in 1881. K.R.R. added passenger service and was extended to Pāʻia in 1884 where a new mill was to be built. Hobron was named postmaster and obtained the government contract for carrying mail to the plantations and towns it serviced.

==== Pineapple ====
In 1889 David and Henry Perrine Baldwin purchased land in west Maui at Honolua and Honokohau adding to property they already owned at Haiʻku in east Maui. They planted pineapple as an experimental crop in 1890. Pineapples did very well as a plantation crop and additional acreages were planted resulting in the founding of Haiʻku Fruit and Packing Company in 1903. Henry Baldwin did so well that he formed the Maui Pineapple Company. The ranch at Honolua had tried a variety of crops and added pineapple at the suggestion of ranch manager David T. Fleming. The operations were so successful that by 1933 over 22,000 acres (89 km^{2}) of pineapple were under production.

=== Government ===
In 1845 Kamehameha III moved his capital from Lahaina to Honolulu. Honolulu was increasingly the hub of business and transport in the islands and it had a fine harbor, which Lahaina lacked. Once sailors in Honolulu began to be prosecuted for drunken or disorderly behavior, the whaling fleet and moored off Lahaina at times 100 ships at a time.

Queen Liliʻuokalani ruled Maui and the other islands until the 1893 Overthrow of the Kingdom of Hawaii. One year later, the Republic of Hawaii was founded. In 1898 the United States annexed the Hawaiian islands naming them the Territory of Hawaii.

== 20th century ==
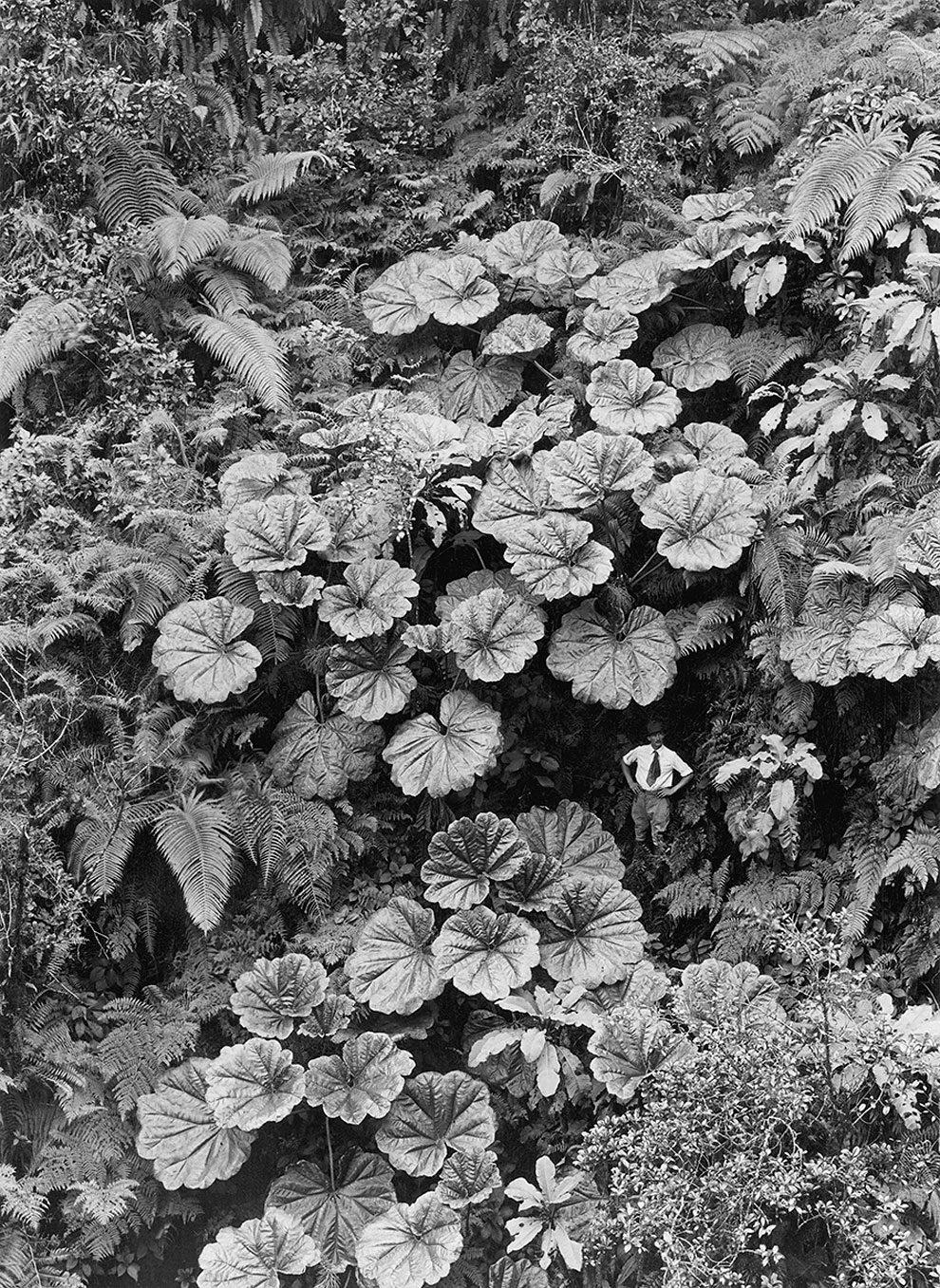
'Ape'ape trees (Gunnera petaloidea) on Maui, with man for scale, 1924

Bubonic plague stopped Kahului's development as Maui's main port in 1900. The shanty-town was deliberately burned to the ground to destroy the rats which carried the disease. The port was quickly rebuilt and a rubble stone breakwater was constructed to improve the harbor in 1884.

=== Agriculture ===
Sugar cane was grown on Maui's west coast in the area between Kāʻanapali and Lahaina. A short line narrow-gauge railroad, the Lahaina Kāʻanapali and Pacific Railroad (L.K.&P. R.R.) brought cane to the Pioneer sugar mill at Lahaina. The railroad closed in the 1950s when trucks were introduced.

HC&S built one of the world's largest sugar mills in 1901 at Puunene. MA built its own sugar mill at Paia in 1906. The next decades brought explosive growth in the sugar industry. The key to cane's growth was water. Sugar companies purchased water rights. Maui Agricultural Company built the Waihee Ditch in cooperation with Wailuku Sugar. The new Wailoa Ditch brought additional east Maui water to the plantations. Companies also began to drill deep water wells. MA also began pineapple plantation farming as an experiment and it eventually became Maui Pineapple Company. In west Maui the Honolua Ditch was reconstructed to the Pioneer sugar mill in Lahaina, supervised by David T. Fleming. In 1913 K.R.R. built a railroad as far as Haʻikū and Paʻuwela over an enormous trestle across the Māliko Gulch, which was the highest trestle ever constructed in the islands at 230 feet (70 m).

In 1948 Maui Agricultural Company and HC&S merged under the name HC&S forming the largest sugar production company in the islands. HC&S began to make significant changes to its operations including the replacing of the narrow-gauge railway it had owned since 1899 with trucks.

=== Government ===
Maui County was established by the territorial legislature in 1905, including the islands of Maui, Lanai, Molokini (uninhabited), Kahoʻolawe (uninhabited), and part of Molokaʻi, with the county seat at Wailuku.

In 1916 Prince Jonah Kuhio, Hawaii's territorial delegate in the U.S. Congress, achieved passage of an act establishing Hawaii National Park, which included the summit of Haleakala. The first permanent ranger was assigned in 1935. The next year improvements were made to the road to the summit. Civilian Conservation Corps and Work Project Authority funds and workers constructed the first visitor center.

The Vibora Luviminda trade union conducted the last ethnically based labor strike in the Hawaiian Islands against four Maui sugarcane plantations in 1937. The union demanded higher wages and dismissal of five foremen. Manuel Fagel and nine other strike leaders were arrested and charged with kidnapping a worker. Fagel spent four months in jail while the strike continued. After 85 days on strike, the workers won a 15% increase in wages, but no contract was signed.

In 1960 Haleakala National Park was separated from Hawaii Volcanoes National Park and expanded in 1969. The entire mountain was declared a federal wilderness area thereby protecting its unique character in perpetuity.

=== Air transport ===
Maui's first airport was built at Maʻalaea in 1927 on land the legislature purchased from HC&S. Regular air service began in November 1929 for amphibious planes. Dirt runways were completed with convict labor in 1930, but were useless in wet weather. By 1936 the location and condition of the runway at Maalaea had become inadequate for the larger planes which were introduced by Inter-Island Airlines. In 1938 the Maalaea airport was condemned by the Federal Bureau of Air Commerce for its close proximity to the mountains of west Maui. Maui's only airport continued operations, but only for small aircraft.

WPA funds paid for a survey for a new airport in 1936 at Puʻunene, but lack of funds prevented its construction until 1938 when it opened with one paved runway and others unpaved. A small US Navy facility opened at the airport for military use.

After the end of World War II the military decommissioned the naval air station at Kahului, so it could support commercial aviation. In 1952 Congress turned Puʻunene airport over to the Territory and transferred all civilian air functions to Kahului.

=== World War II ===
After Japan's attack on December 7, 1941, all airfields in the islands were militarized. The military determined that the airport at Puʻunene was unsatisfactory and condemned land to build a new Naval Air Station in 1942. Puʻunene was also expanded as the war continued.

Maui was involved in the Pacific Theater of World War II as a staging center, training base, and for rest and relaxation. At 1943-44 peak, the number of troops stationed on Maui exceeded 100,000. The main base of the 4th Marine Division was in Haiku. Beaches (e.g., in Kīhei) were used for practice landings and training in marine demolition and sabotage. MA converted its lime kiln facility to a cement plant for the duration of the war. Thousands of former G.I.'s settled on the islands. Those who did not settle returned as tourists, which became the foundation of Maui's modern economy.

=== Tourism ===
Maui's first resort hotel, Hotel Hana, opened in 1946. In 1961 Maui's first planned resort community opened at Kāʻanapali on what had been part of the old pineapple plantation belonging to the Maui Pineapple Company on Maui's west coast.
