= Halekiʻi-Pihana Heiau State Monument =

- Halekiʻi-Pihana Heiau
- U.S. National Register of Historic Places
- Hawaiʻi Register of Historic Places
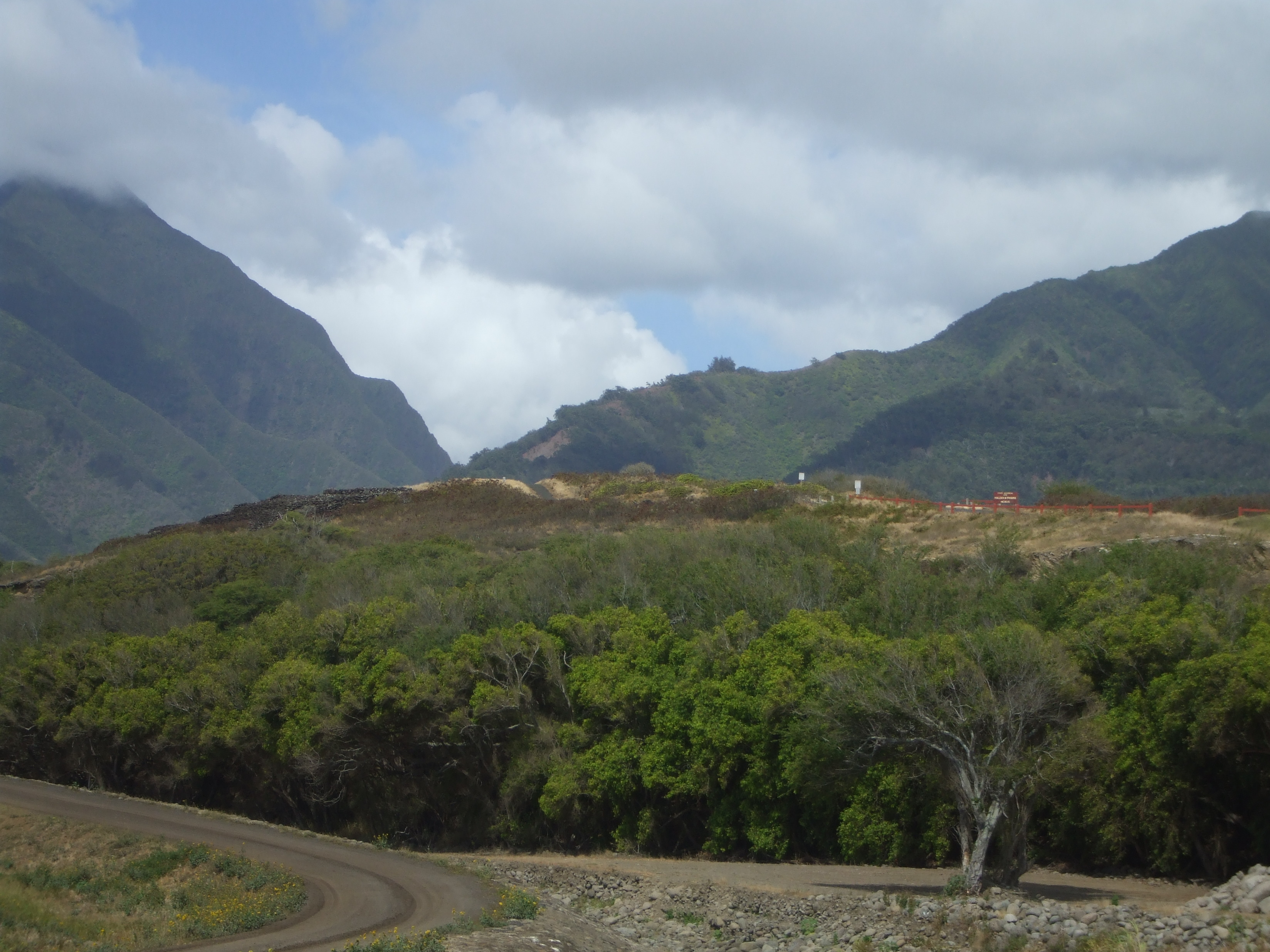
- View from bridge over Wailuku River

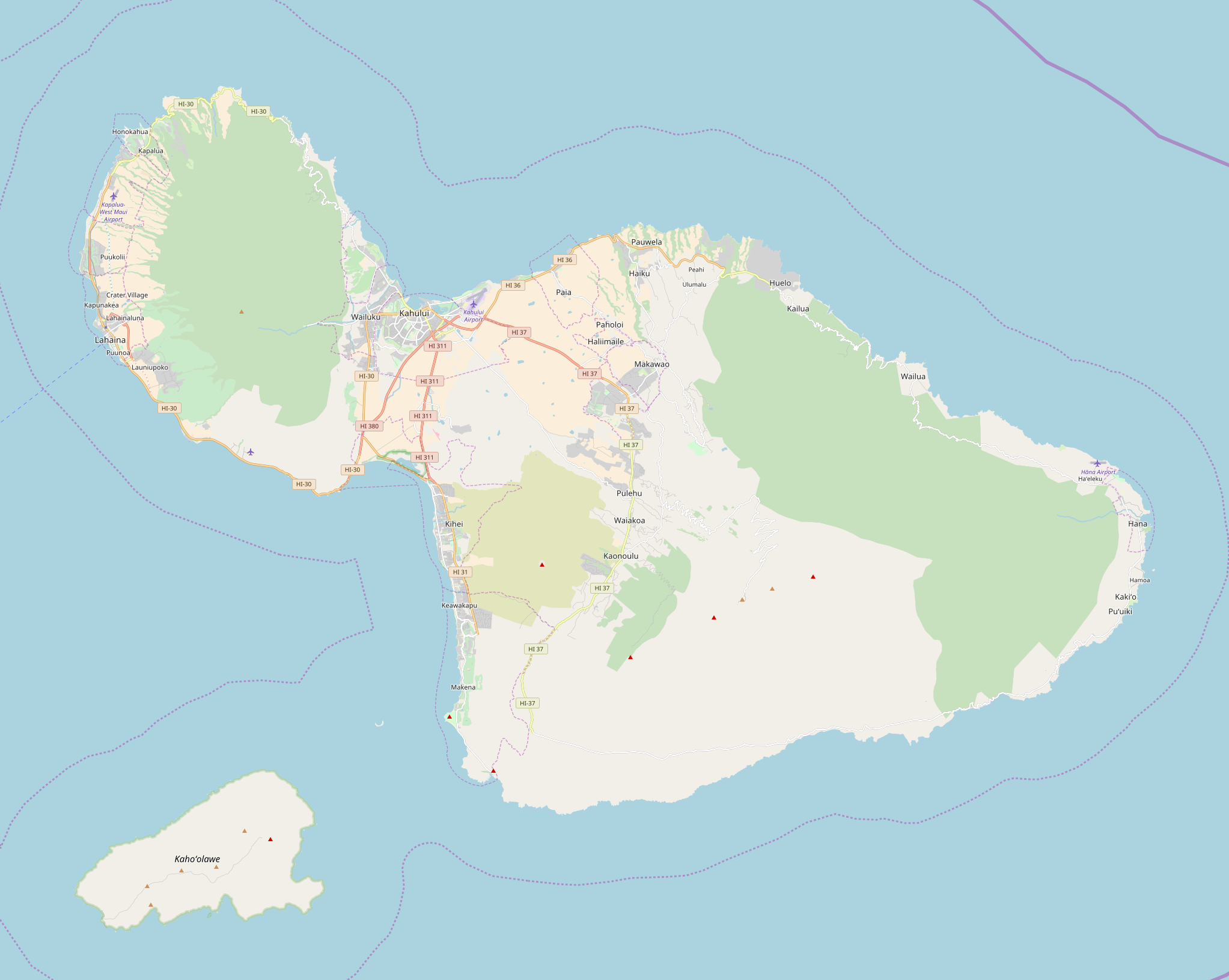
- Location within Maui Location within Hawaii
- Location: Hea Pl. off Kuhio Pl. from Waiehu Beach Rd.
- Nearest city: Wailuku, Hawaii
- Coordinates: 20°54′30″N 156°29′42″W
- Area: 10 acres (4.0 ha)
- NRHP reference No.: 85002972
- HRHP No.: 50-50-04-00592

Significant dates
- Added to NRHP: 25 November 1985
- Designated HRHP: June 29, 1985

Halekiʻi-Pihana Heiau State Monument is a 10-acre (4.0 ha) park containing two important luakini heiau on a high ridge near the mouth of ʻĪao Stream in Wailuku, Maui. Both Halekiʻi and Pihana were associated with important Hawaiian chiefs, have been closely studied by archaeologists, and overlook the fertile Nā Wai ʻEhā ('Four Waters') region irrigated by the Wailuku, Waikapu, Waiheʻe and Waiehu streams. The heiau complex was added to the National Register of Historic Places on 25 November 1985.

Pihana ('fullness' or 'gathering') is also known as Piihana and Pihanakalani ('gathering of the supernatural'). It began as a small temple site between 1260 and 1400, was expanded between 1410 and 1640 to serve as a residence and luakini (war/sacrificial) temple for Kiʻihewa, who lived at the time of Kakaʻe, the father of Kahekili I.

Halekiʻi ('image house' or "Tiki House") was added along the crest of the hill at about this time, reputedly at the instigation of chief Kihapiʻilani. Both were greatly expanded into their present shape between 1662 and 1705, and Pihana was enhanced and reoriented to face the island of Hawaiʻi during a period of interisland warfare between 1684 and 1778. In 1790, after the forces of Kamehameha I won the very deadly Battle of Kepaniwai, his son Liholiho rededicated Pihana.

== See also ==
- List of Hawaii state parks
