= Anton Josef Kirchweger =

German alchemist

Anton Kirchweger (died 8 February 1746) He was the editor or the author of the influential German hermetical book Aurea Catena Homeri (Golden Chain of Homer); Aurea Catena Homeri oder, Eine Beschreibung von dem Ursprung der Natur und natürlichen Dingen (The Golden Chain of Homer, or A Description of Nature and Natural Things). The book was read by Pietists and later influenced the young Goethe. It was first published in Leipzig in 1723, in the German language, followed by other editions: 1723, 1728, 1738 and 1757 (Latin edition). Another Latin version was issued at Frankfurt in 1762. Sometime in the late eighteenth century Sigismund Bacstrom translated parts of the work into English. In 1891, part of the translation was published in the Theosophical Society journal Lucifer.

== Works ==
- Aurea Catena Homeri. Das ist: Eine Beschreibung von dem Ursprung der Natur und natürlichen Dinge, wie und woraus sie gebohren und gezeuget, auch wie sie erhalten und wiederum in ihr uranfängliches Wesen zerstöret werden, auch was das Ding sey welches alles gebähret und wieder zerstöret, ganz simpliciter nach der Natur selbst eigner Anleitung und Ordnung mit seinen schönsten natürlichen rationibus und Ursachen überall illustriret. Neue Auflage, welche nach einem accuraten und vollständigen Manuscript fast auf allen Blättern verbessert, und an sehr vielen Orten um ein grosses auch nunmehro mit dem ächten Dritten Theil vermehret ist, 1723.
- Microscopivm Basilii Valentini, sive commentariolvm et cribrellum über den großen Kreuzapfel der Welt. Ein Euphoriston der ganzen Medicin, ex theoria et praxi Grauinii. Ein Compendium der ganzen chymischen Scienz und Physica Hermetica Concentrata; ein Werk, so noch nie gesehen worden, höchst nützlich zur Praxi und der jetzigen Welt höchst nöthig, 1781.
