= Butterworth Squadron =

British commercial ships (1780s–1790s)

Jackal
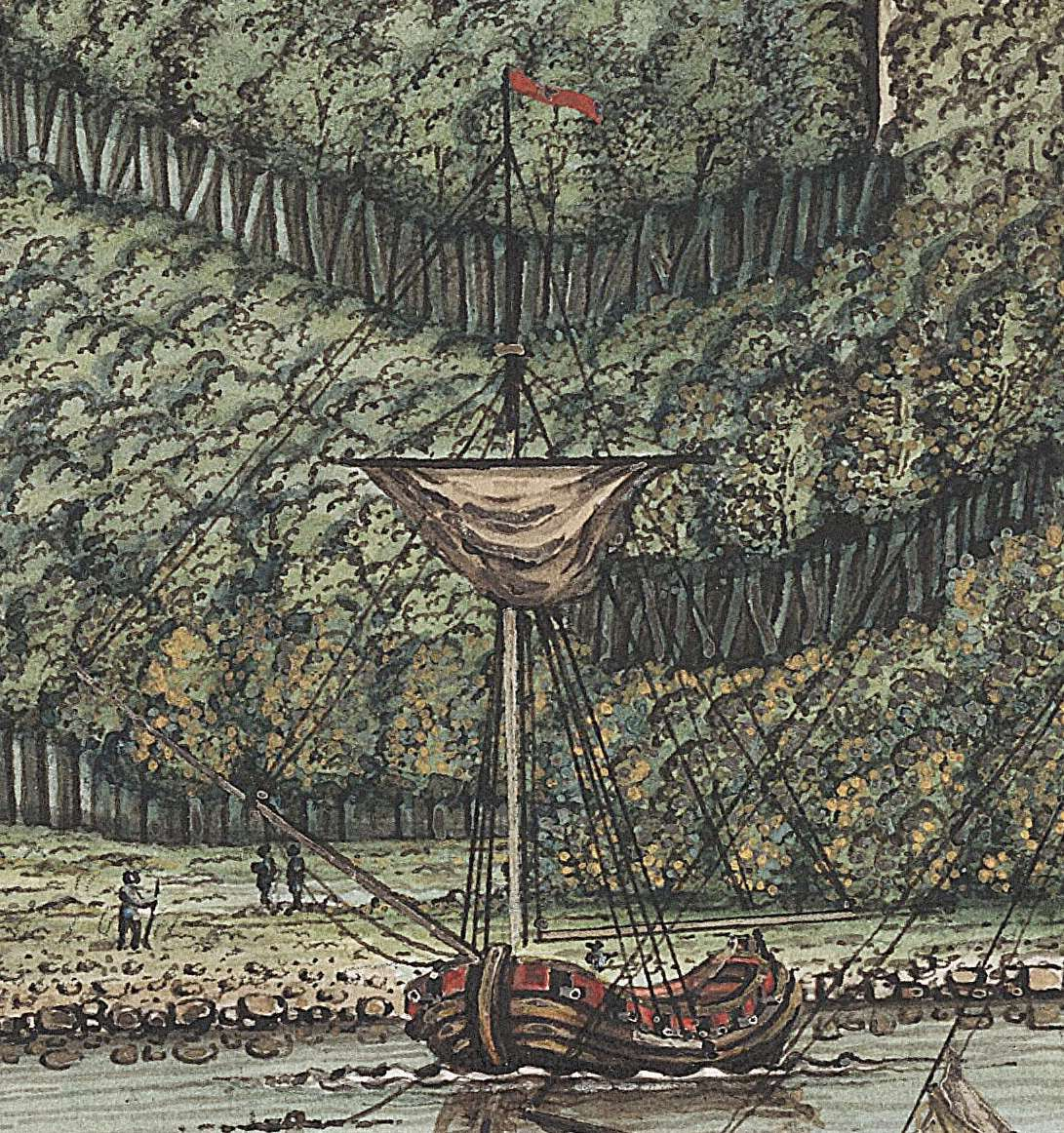
- Jackal 1792

History

Great Britain
- Name: Jackal
- Owner: Priestly
- Launched: 1782, in America
- Fate: Last listed in Lloyd's Register in 1796

General characteristics
- Class & type: tender to Butterworth
- Tons burthen: 86 (bm)
- Sail plan: sloop

Prince Lee Boo
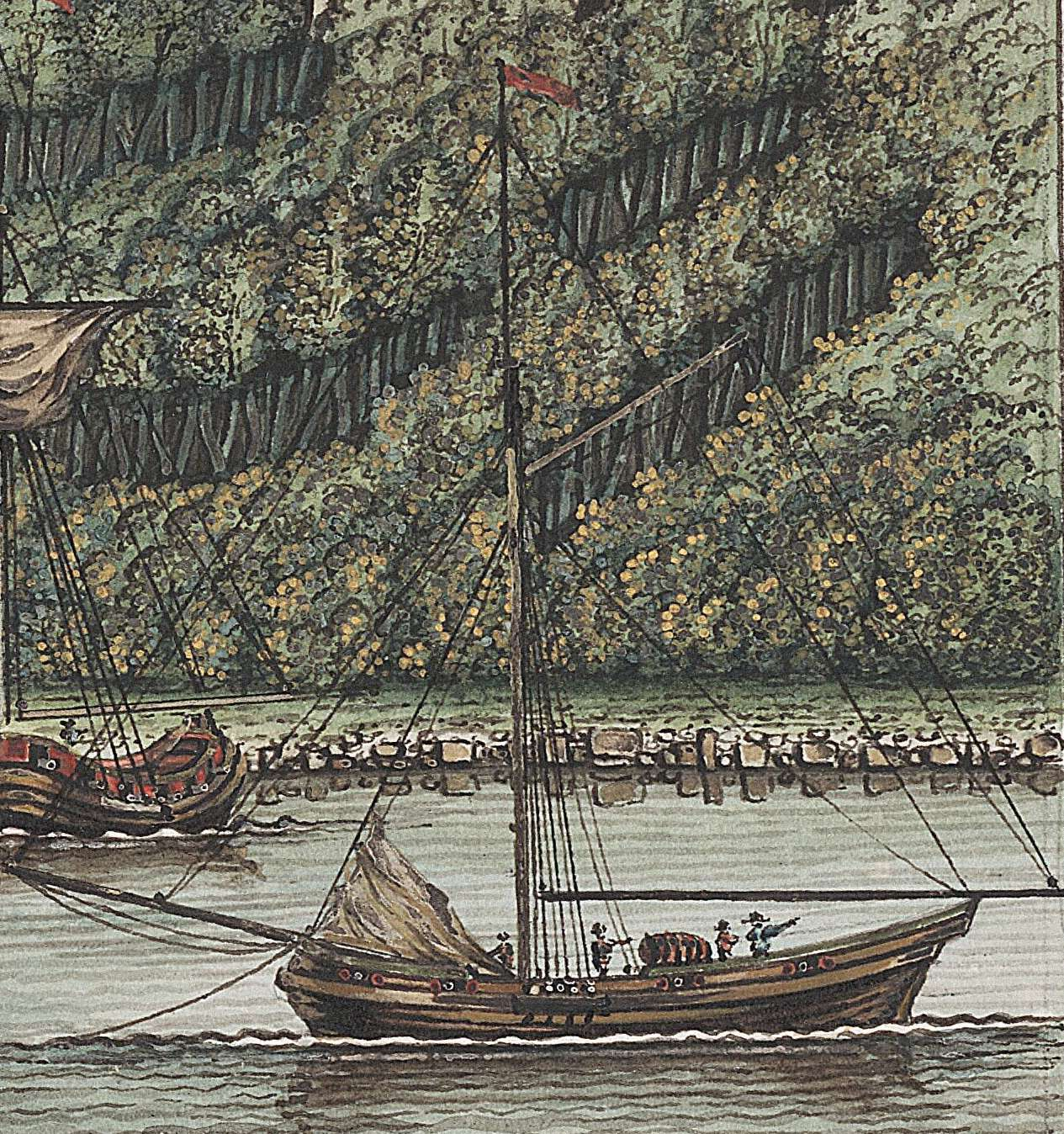
- Prince Lee Boo 1792

History

Great Britain
- Name: Prince Lee Boo
- Owner: Priestly
- Launched: 1791 on the Thames

General characteristics
- Class & type: tender to Butterworth
- Tons burthen: 56 (bm)
- Sail plan: sloop

The Butterworth Squadron was a British commercial group of three vessels, Butterworth, Jackal, and Prince Lee Boo, that sailed for the Pacific Ocean from London via Cape Horn in late 1791. The principals financing the expedition were Alderman William Curtis, London ship-owner Theophilus Pritzler, and probably John Perry (shipbuilder), a Blackwall shipbuilder. The leader of the expedition was Captain William Brown, an established whaling captain from the Greenland whale fishery. Sigismund Bacstrom, a naturalist who had previously sailed as a secretary to Joseph Banks, was the surgeon for the expedition. Bacstrom produced a number of drawings during the first part of the voyage, some of which are still in existence.

The expedition is notable for a violent conflict with the Tla-o-qui-aht of Vancouver Island and another reported conflict in Formosa. Butterworth, Jackal and Prince Lee Boo are often credited with being the first European vessels to enter Honolulu Harbor.

Jackal and Prince Lee Boo are also notable for taking part in the Battle of Nuʻuanu between Kalanikūpule and his uncle, Kaʻeokulani, on the island of Oʻahu, for firing the shot that killed John Kendrick aboard Lady Washington, and for participating in an aborted attack on Kamehameha I by Kalanikūpule.

== The vessels ==
The squadron consisted of three vessels, Butterworth, a full-rigged ship four to six times the size of the two sloops that accompanied her. The role of each of the two sloops, Jackal and Prince Lee Boo, was to act as a ship's tender, to scout ahead in shallower waters, or to go off on errands. A man named Priestly owned both sloops.

Butterworth's burthen was 390 to 400 tons. Jackall's burthen 86 tons; Prince Lee Boo's was 56 tons. (Burthen was a volumetric measure of cargo capacity, though expressed in tons.) As her burthen and several accounts attest, Prince Lee Boo was somewhat smaller than Jackal.

As was typical of the times, all three vessels were armed. Butterworth carried sixteen guns; the two smaller vessels had nine guns between them.

=== Butterworth ===
Butterworth was a former French vessel, built in 1778, that came into British hands in 1784. In British hands she became a whaler. Her master was Captain William Brown, "an able and expert seaman, regularly brought up in the whale fishery." Brown and Butterworth were Greenland whalers. Brown was highly respected in his field and was consulted by a Fellow of the Royal Society concerning the possibility of approaching the North Pole.

=== Jackal ===
Jackal (sometimes spelled "Jackall" or "Jack Hall"), had been launched in America in 1782. The one contemporary picture of her appears to show a lapstrake sloop with tiller steering, and a removable bowsprit and lightly stayed mast such as were commonly found on longboats and cutters intended to be carried on deck or towed astern of larger vessels. She "showed a tier of ports fore and aft. The greatest part of them were false or only painted, yet they made such a good appearance that for some time we concluded she was a King's cutter or a tender to some man-of-war".

Alexander Stewart served as master of Jackal from her departure from London in late 1791 until Captain Brown took command in late 1793. Upon the death of Capt. Brown in 1795, George Lamport took command of Jackal.

=== Prince Lee Boo ===
Prince Lee Boo had been launched on the Thames in 1791. She was named for Prince Lee Boo, a young Palau Islander who traveled to London in 1784.

Masters of Prince Lee Boo were Mr. Richard Sharp, and later Robert Gordon. (Note: Lloyd's register gives the name of Prince Lee Boo's master as E. Sharp. However, it is more probably Richard Sharp, who had been a midshipman aboard Antelope which had wrecked at Palau. Captain Henry Wilson of Antelope had carried Prince Lee Boo with him to England, where Lee Boo died.) Upon the death of Robert Gordon in 1795, William Bonallack took command of Prince Lee Boo.

== Voyage 1791–1795 ==
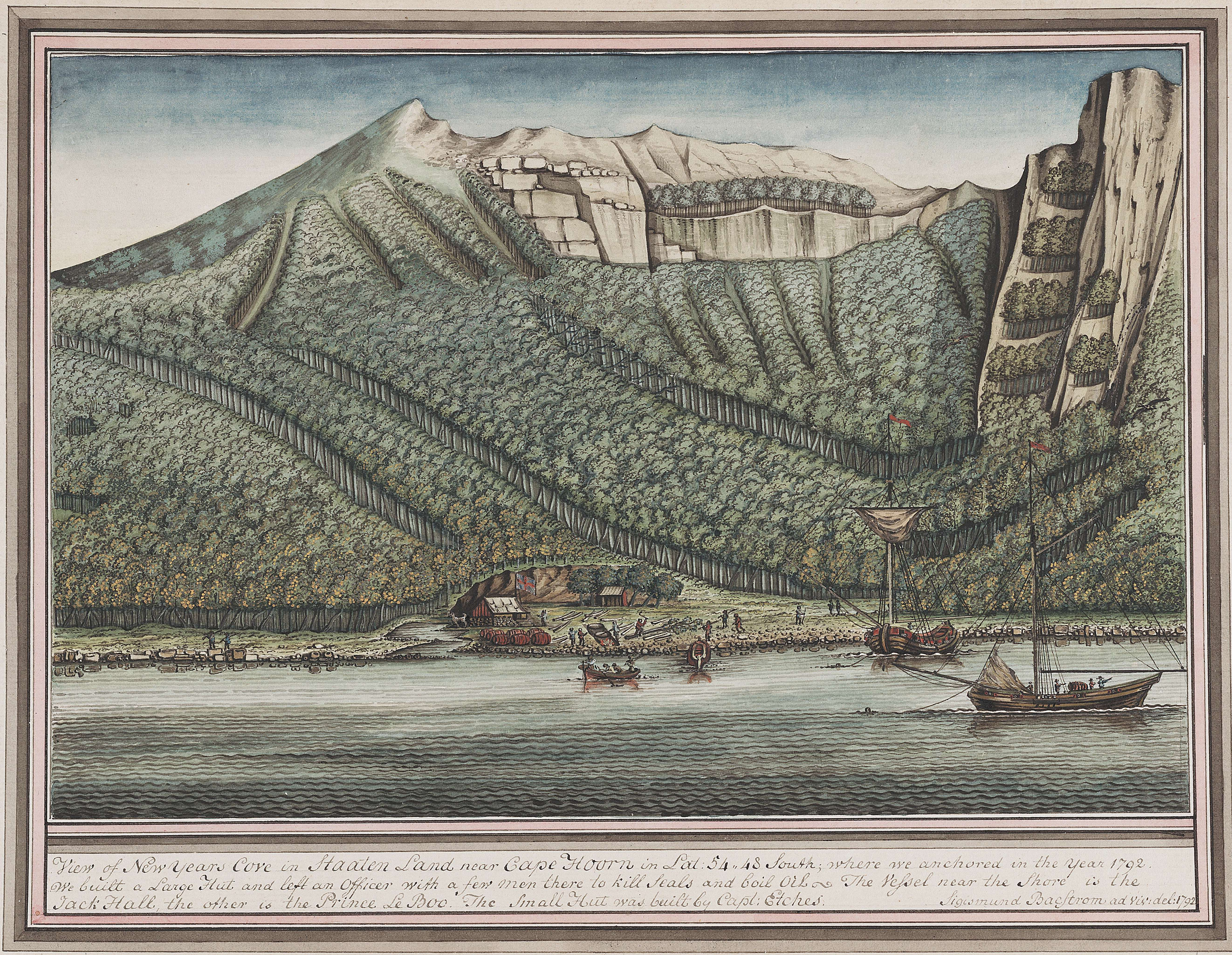
Butterworth Expedition Sealing Camp on Staten Island, Drawing by Sigismund Bacstrom

Although Sigismund Bacstrom, in a letter to Sir Joseph Banks of Aug. 1791, claimed that the expedition was a commercial venture aimed at bringing back "valuable drugs or natural products" and quite "independent of the new fur trade between Nootka and China," there is no evidence that it was concerned with anything but the lucrative maritime fur trade and the sealery of Tierra del Fuego.

In 1791 as the Butterworth expedition was being organized, Alderman Curtis was actively involved in the debate for opening the trade monopolies to Pacific Ocean trade held by the South Sea Company and the East India Company, particularly in light of the recent Nootka Convention with Spain which opened the Pacific Northwest Coast to British traders.

=== Sealing/whaling ===
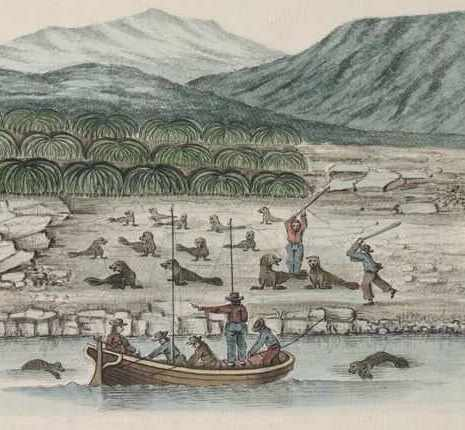
Clubbing Seals at Staten Island, Detail from Bacstrom

In early 1792, Butterworth anchored in New Year's Cove on Staten Island, Tierra del Fuego, where they "built a Large Hut and left an Officer with a few Men there to kill Seals and boil Oil."[Bacstrom]

Butterworth would not return for these men until the end of 1793 when Butterworth was "dispatched towards England with directions to fish for whales and seals in passing through the Pacific Ocean, and at Staten Island where Mr. Brown had formed a temporary establishment."

=== Northwest Coast ===
From Cape Horn the Butterworth squadron sailed to the Marquesas Islands and on to the Vancouver Island, reaching Clayoquot Sound in late July 1792.

In early August, Captain Brown claimed there was an unprovoked attack by the Tla-o-qui-aht People, killing one of his crew and seriously injuring two others, but other vessels present at the time told a different story.

"The English sailors landed at a village in order to rob the natives and actually cut several skins off the natives' backs. Seeing them gathering to defend themselves, the sailors fired on them, by which they said four men were killed. This was before the natives were armed, but they found their mistake as soon as Wickaninnish's warriors turned out, who with two canoes made the whaleboats fly. Had not Captain Magee [of the ship Margaret] fired a cannon shot between them, they would certainly have been cut off ... However, the Englishmen ... took ample revenge. After they were out of port ... they fell in with some canoes fishing. Captain Brown got the men out of them and caused them to be whipped in a most unmerciful manner by the Sandwich Islanders he had on board. After that he threw them into the sea, and the ship Jenny ... being astern, fired at them and ended the tragedy." One of the men killed was the brother of the chief Wickaninnish.

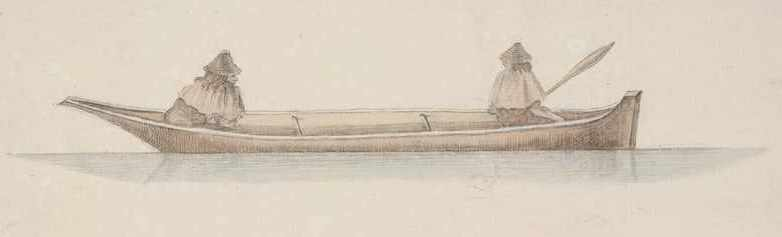
Nootka Canoe, Detail from Bacstrom

The Butterworth squadron then sailed north to Nootka and Haida Gwaii, returning to Nootka Sound in October. Sigismund Bacstrom, the Butterworth's surgeon and naturalist, left the Butterworth at Nootka on October 15, 1792 "on account of the ill and mean usage I received from Capt. W. Brown and his Officers." Prince Lee Boo was often used to take soundings ahead of Butterworth. She was loaned to Captain George Vancouver for this purpose in Queen Charlotte Sound in 1793.

The squadron did not procure many furs on their first visit to the Northwest Coast. They wintered in the Hawaiian Islands and returned early the next year, in the Spring 1793. They had better success the 2nd year, and at the end of Autumn, Captain Brown dispatched Butterworth to return to England around Cape Horn, picking up the sealing party he had left there, with the seal skins they were expected to have procured. Brown then sailed in to Canton in Prince Lee Boo with all the furs collected by the three ships. According to Capt. George Vancouver, both Jackal and Prince Lee Boo made this voyage to Canton.

=== Hawaii ===
The Butterworth squadron first wintered at the Hawaiian Islands in February 1793, when control of the Islands was divided between Kamehameha who controlled Hawaiʻi and much of Maui, and Kahekili who controlled the islands west of Maui including Oahu and Kauai. Brown traded in weapons with both Kamehameha and Kahekili, but strongly favored the latter. In particular he entered into a contract with Kahekili giving Brown the title to the island of Oahu together with four islands to windward in return for weapons and military assistance, suppressing a revolt on Kauai. James Coleman, a seaman left in Niʻihau by Captain Kendrick who had later joined Kehikili's forces, was given stewardship of the land for Capt. Brown and authority over foreign trade during Brown's absence. Although the exact date is in question, it was probably during this period of alliance with Kahekili that the Butterworth squadron became the first European vessels allowed to enter the inner Honolulu Harbor. By Hawaiian tradition, this contract would have ended upon Kahekili's death in 1794

==== Battle of Kukiʻiahu ====
Jackal and Prince Lee Boo returned to Oahu on 21 November 1794 to find a different situation from the one they had left. On the death of Kahekili, his son Kalanikūpule had succeeded him as ruler of Oʻahu, and Kahekili's half-brother Kaʻeokulani, who had retained command of the Maui group of islands, was invading Oʻahu. This war became known as Kuki'iahu and was fought from November 16 until December 12, 1794.

When Jackal and Prince Lee Boo arrived at Honolulu, Kalanikūpule requested their assistance in the battle. In return Brown was to receive 400 hogs, and according to some accounts, authority over the island of Oʻahu. Eight men under the command of George Lamport, mate of the Jackal, joined Kalanikūpule's forces in a series of battles ashore while Captain Brown and the remaining crew defended the shoreline from the Jackal and Prince Lee Boo.

==== Jackall fires on Lady Washington ====
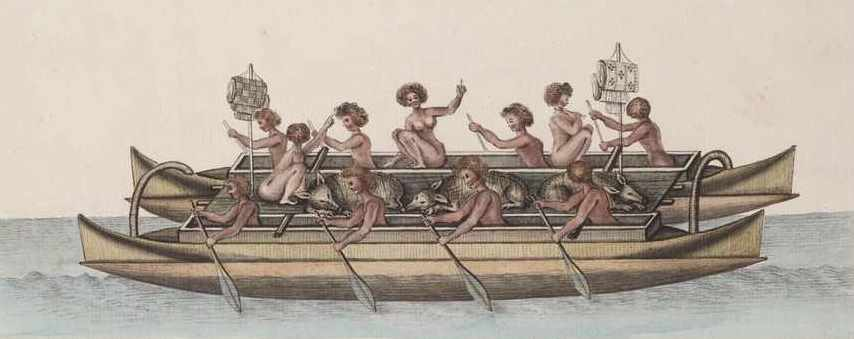
Hawaiian Double Canoe, Detail from Bacstrom

On December 3, 1794, during the conflict, the American snow Lady Washington arrived in Pearl Harbor where she was "met with a friendly reception by Capt. Brown." On December 6, a battle was fought, Kalanikūpule was victorious.

The accounts differ as to what next happened. According to Captain Bishop of the British ship Ruby, Kalanikūpule "came off and did homage to Brown as before, and at his return was saluted by one of the vessels, one of the guns happened to be shotted, which pierced the cabin of the American sloop [sic] and killed poor Kendrick at his table."

According to Captain Boit of the American sloop Union, Kendrick "informed Capt. Brown that on the morrow he should cause the flag of the United States to be hoisted and fire a federal salute, which he begged might be answered by the two Englishmen, and it was accordingly agreed to, and Capt. Brown ordered three guns to be unshotted for that purpose, and about ten the next morning the ship Jackal began to salute, but on coming to the third gun it was discovered to be primed. So the apron of the fourth firearm was taken off which was fired and being shotted with round and grape shot, it pierced the side of the Lady Washington and killed Capt Kendrick as he sat at his table, and killed and wounded many upon the deck."

James Rowan, the mate of Lady Washington at the time, would later say that "he had sworn since Captain Kendrick's death he would salute no vessel in a hurry, except at a safe distance."

Captain Kendrick's body was buried ashore. Shortly thereafter Lady Washington sailed for Canton.

==== Capture of Jackal and Prince Lee Boo ====
Kaʻeokulani's invading forces were defeated on December 12. Soon after, a dispute arose between Capt. Brown and Kalanikūpule over what was owed to Brown regarding his claims to Oahu and his obligations to Kalanikūpule. The exact nature of this dispute is not clearly recorded, but it has been suggested that Kalanikūpule may have requested that Brown and his men assist Kalanikūpule in an attack against Kamehameha on Hawaiʻi, and Brown may have refused. If Brown did indeed have a land claim from Kalanikūpule, this would have traditionally required him to serve in time of war, and to refuse would have been considered rebellion, punishable by death.

Kalanikūpule then decided to kill Captain Brown and capture Jackal and Prince Lee Boo. At his general's advice, he agreed to pay the 400 hogs. On January 1, 1795, the hogs were herded down to the beach to be slaughtered and salted down in barrels. But a great quantity of salt was needed for the task, so a party of men and a boat were sent some distance to collect it. As the mates of Jackal and Prince Lee Boo told the story soon afterwards:

"When the greatest part of the crew of the Jackall being on shore salting pork and the remainder part away with their boat collecting salt, except [Capt. Brown] and one man, and part of the crew of the Prince Le Boo likewise on shore on duty, that the natives of the said island about ten a.m. on the 1st of January attacked the said vessel with several canoes, killed the commander William Brown and Robert Gordon and wounded several others and got possession of the vessel."

Kalanikūpule and his generals then determined to attack Kamehameha's forces on Hawaiʻi. On January 3 the captured crew was put to work preparing the vessels for sea, and on January 11 they were ready to sail for Hawaiʻi. Kalanikūpule ordered all of the arms and ammunition to be loaded into the two captured vessels, along with all the captured crew, although he was advised by his general to divide them among the canoes. This proved to be a fatal mistake.

According to Lamport and Bonallack who were present, on

the 12th of January ... about three p.m. the chiefs ordered the vessels out of the harbor to go to the bay of Waikiki where about 4 p.m we brought up and lay till ten p.m., and having all the people on board we both attacked the natives, wounded and drove them overboard and got possession of both vessels when we repaired to the island of Hawaiʻi.

Another early manuscript gives more detail:

The next afternoon, Mr. Bonallack, mate of the Lee Boo, coming on board the Jackal, agreed with Mr. Lamport to attempt retaking the ships at 11 o'clock that night. The Lee Boo took the lead and succeeded. Mr. Lamport, hearing before the appointed hour the report of a pistol from that vessel, ran from the cabin on deck, called to his men below that death or victory must issue in five minutes, and with only three of them armed, attacked twenty-three armed Indians on the quarterdeck, reserving their fire till close at hand, and then falling upon them with the butt end of their muskets, which soon broke. Of forty-two Natives whom they had counted on board before dark, they cleared the ships in ten minutes."

With Kalanikūpule, his wife and four of their attendants confined in Jackal's cabin, Jackal and Prince Lee Boo sailed for Hawaiʻi, releasing Kalanikūpule, his wife and one attendant in a canoe as they passed Diamond Head at daybreak.

When they arrived at Hawaiʻi, Lamport and Bonallack informed John Young and Kamehameha of Kalanikūpule's invasion plans, and of their intentions "to proceed immediately to China as our distressed situation will not allow us to proceed around Cape Horn." They were able to trade for provisions, handing over Kalanikūpule's arms and ammunition as payment.

=== Conclusion of the voyage ===
Jackal and Prince Lee Boo arrived in China, and are reported to have been sold there. Prince Lee Boo is last listed in Lloyd's Register for 1794.

Several of the crew of Jackal and Prince Lee Boo remained in the Pacific, notably Capt. Alexander Stewart and John Harbottle, who had both been officers in the Butterworth squadron and became prominent officers in the navy of the Kingdom of Hawaii. Stewart had left Jackal in Macao in 1793, returning to Hawaiʻi to marry, probably in 1795. Harbottle later sailed on the ship Nautilus and was severely injured when the crew was attacked in Formosa, reportedly in retaliation for earlier depredations by Capt. Brown when the Butterworth squadron visited the island in 1793.

Butterworth successfully returned to England on 3 February 1795, with Sharpe, master. She was carrying 85 tuns of whale oil and 17500 seal skins. She then made several more whaling voyages. Lloyd's List reported that Butterworth, Folger, master, had been lost on 13 July 1802 off St. Jago, while outbound to the Southern Fisheries. One man was drowned, but the rest of the crew were saved and returned to Portsmouth.
