= Iao Valley =

Valley in the West Maui Mountains

ʻĪao Valley
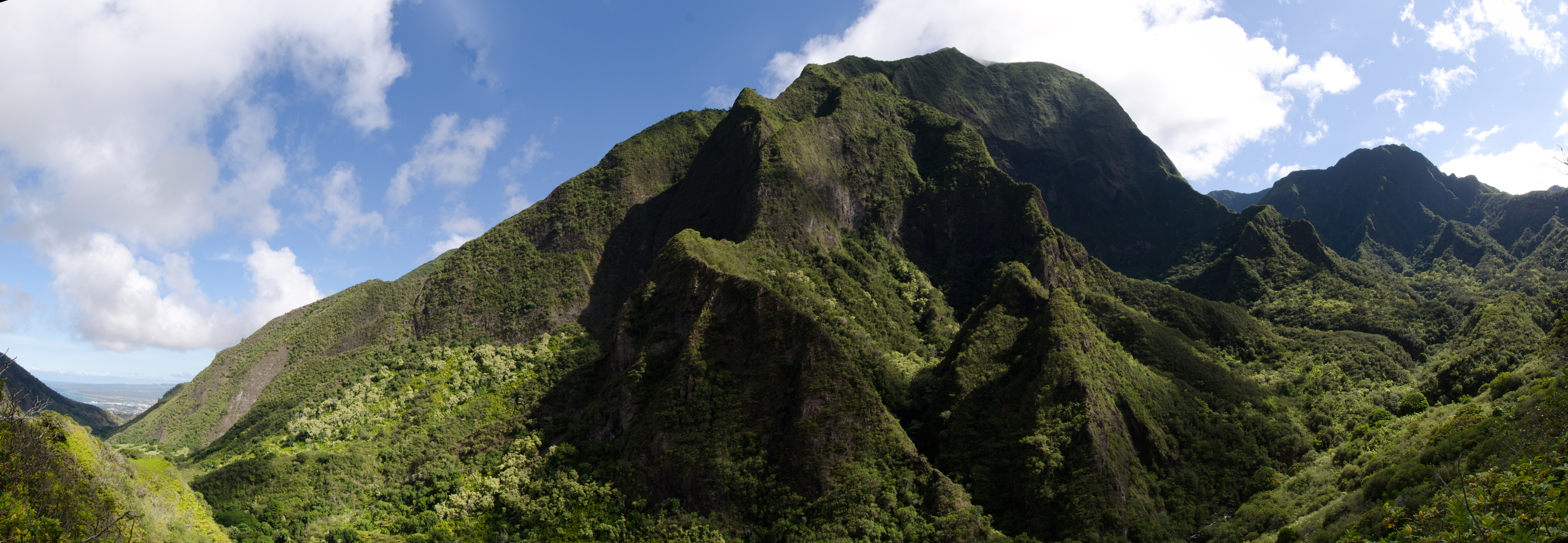

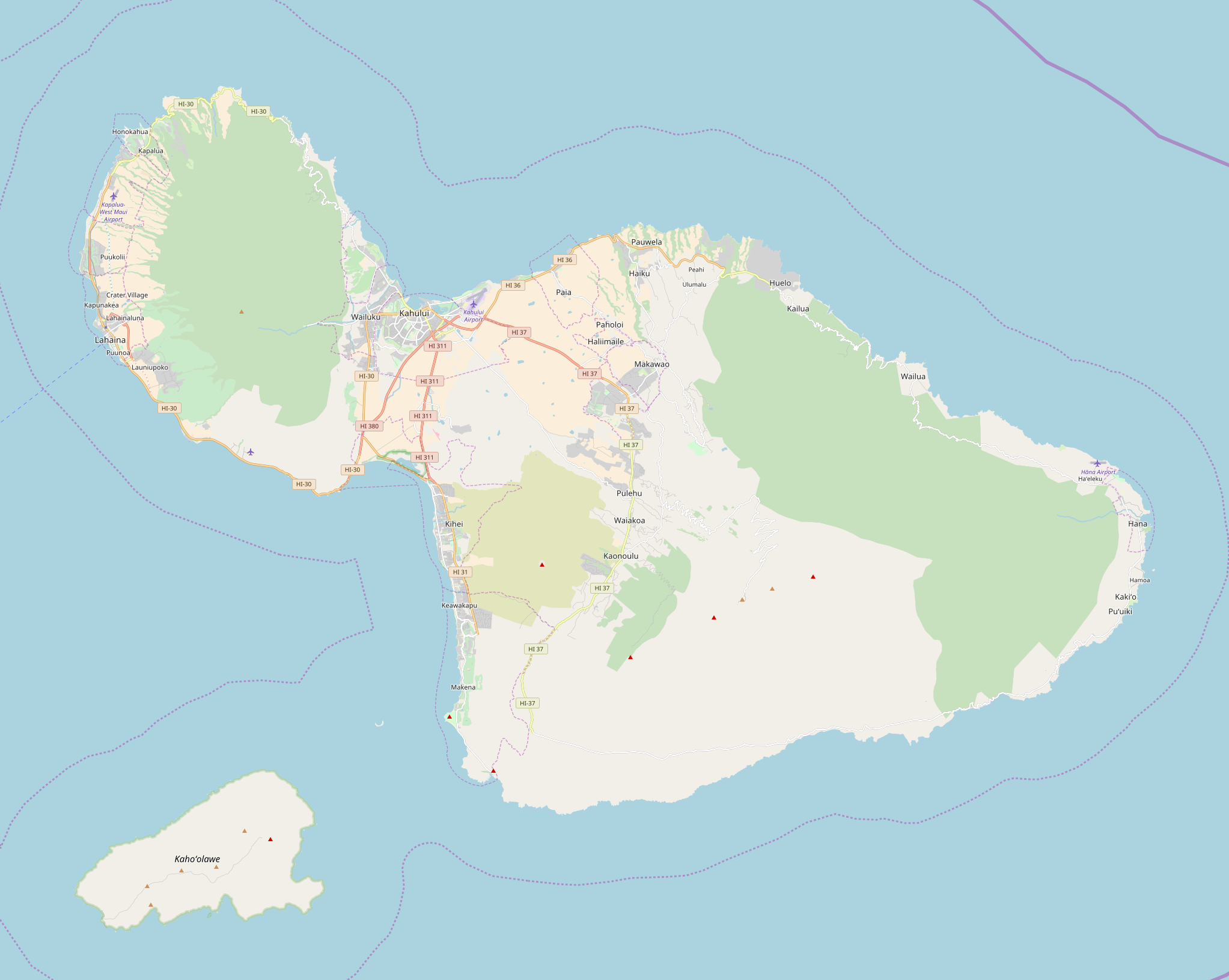
- Location within Maui Location within Hawaii
- Floor elevation: 1,000 feet (300 m)

Geography
- Location: West Maui Mountains
- Coordinates: 20°52′51″N 156°32′42″W
- Interactive map of ʻĪao Valley

U.S. National Natural Landmark
- Designated: 1972

ʻĪao Valley, (/ˈiːaʊ/; Hawaiian for "cloud supreme") is a lush, stream-cut valley in West Maui, Hawaii, located 3.1 miles (5 km) west of Wailuku. Because of its natural environment and history, it has become a tourist location. It was designated a National Natural Landmark in 1972.

== ʻĪao Valley State Monument ==
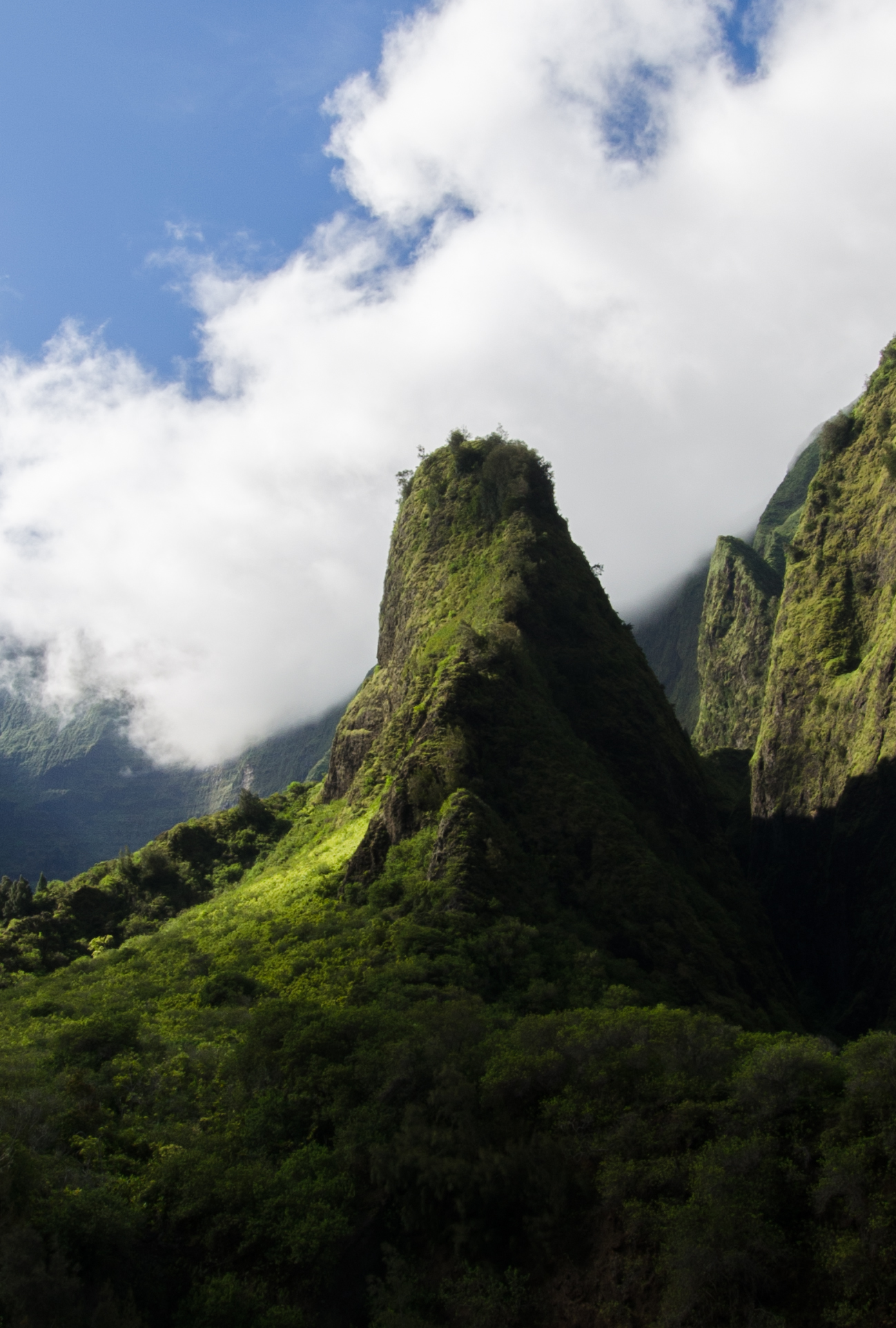
The ʻĪao Needle. Rising 1,200 ft (370 m) from the valley floor, it is taller than the Eiffel Tower.

The state park is located on 6.2 acres (2.5 ha) at the end of ʻĪao Valley Road (Highway 32). The ʻĪao Needle (Kūkaʻemoku), a landmark in the state park, is a vegetation-covered lava remnant rising 1,200 feet (370 m) from the valley floor or 2,250 feet (690 m) above sea level. The "needle" is a sharp ridge that gives the appearance of being a spire when viewed end-on. The needle is an extension of and surrounded by the cliffs of the West Maui Mountains, an extinct volcano. There is a short trail (ʻĪao Needle Lookout Trail and Ethnobotanical Loop) to a windy overlook.

== Rainforest ==
The ʻĪao Valley is covered in dense rainforest, most of which consists of introduced vegetation on the valley floor. The Puʻu Kukui summit area at the valley's head receives an average 386 inches (9.8 m) of rainfall per year, making it the state's second wettest location after The Big Bog, slightly wetter than Mount Waiʻaleʻale. Much of this rainfall ends up flowing into the ʻĪao Stream. Trails in the State Park run alongside ʻĪao Stream and through the forest.

Above the ʻĪao valley at the Puʻu Kukui watershed is a native cloud forest of ʻohiʻa and koa. This forest is home to many native species including birds like the ʻiʻiwi, ʻapapane and ʻamakihi.

== History ==
The Hawaiian god Kāne is considered to be the procreator and the provider of life. He is associated with wai (fresh water) as well as clouds, rain, streams, and springs. Kanaloa, the Hawaiian god of the underworld, is represented by the phallic stone of Kukaʻemoku, the ʻĪao Needle.

Kapawā, the king of Hawaiʻi prior to Pilikaʻaiea, was buried here. Maui's ruler Kakaʻe designated ʻĪao Valley as an aliʻi burial ground in the late 15th century. The remains were buried in secret places. In 1790, the Battle of Kepaniwai took place there, in which Kamehameha the Great defeated Kalanikūpule and the Maui army during his campaign to unify the islands. The battle was said to be so bloody that dead bodies blocked ʻĪao Stream, and the battle site was named Kepaniwai ("the damming of the waters").

== Kepaniwai Park and Heritage Gardens ==
Established in 1952, the Heritage Gardens in Kepaniwai Park recognize the multicultural history of Maui. Tributes and structures celebrate the contributions of Hawaiian, American missionary, Chinese, Japanese, Portuguese, Korean, and Filipino cultures. The gardens had become overgrown and were restored in 1994. The Hawaii nature center, just outside the gardens, has a museum and children's education about Hawaii and conservation.
