= Vibora Luviminda =

Defunct American trade union

The Vibora Luviminda was a trade union founded in 1924 on the island of Maui by Antonio Fagel. The union focused largely on Filipino labor issues.

The Vibora Luviminda conducted the last labor strike of an ethnic nature in the Hawaiian Islands against four Maui sugar plantations in 1937, demanding higher wages and dismissal of five foremen. Antonio Fagel and nine other strike leaders were arrested, charged with kidnapping a worker. Fagel spent four months in jail while the strike continued. Eventually, Vibora Luviminda made its point and the workers won a 15% increase in wages after 85 days on strike, but there was no written contract signed.

The years of the 1930s were the years of a world wide economic depression. Unemployment was estimated at up to 25 million in the United States. The depression brought with it widespread hunger and breadlines. Hawaii too was affected and for a while labor union organization appeared to come to a standstill. The loosely organized Vibora Luviminda withered away. The era of workers divided by ethnic groups in Hawaii was thus ended forever.
