= Battle of Kepaniwai =

1790 battle of the Unification of Hawaii

Coordinates: 20°52′51″N 156°32′42″W

- Part of Unification of Hawaii
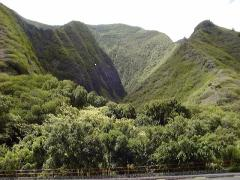
- ʻĪao Valley
Date	1790
Location	Maui
Result	Inconclusive

Belligerents
Hawaiʻi Island	Maui

Commanders and leaders
Kamehameha I Kekuhaupiʻo	Kalanikūpule

Strength
~5,000–8,000	~3,000

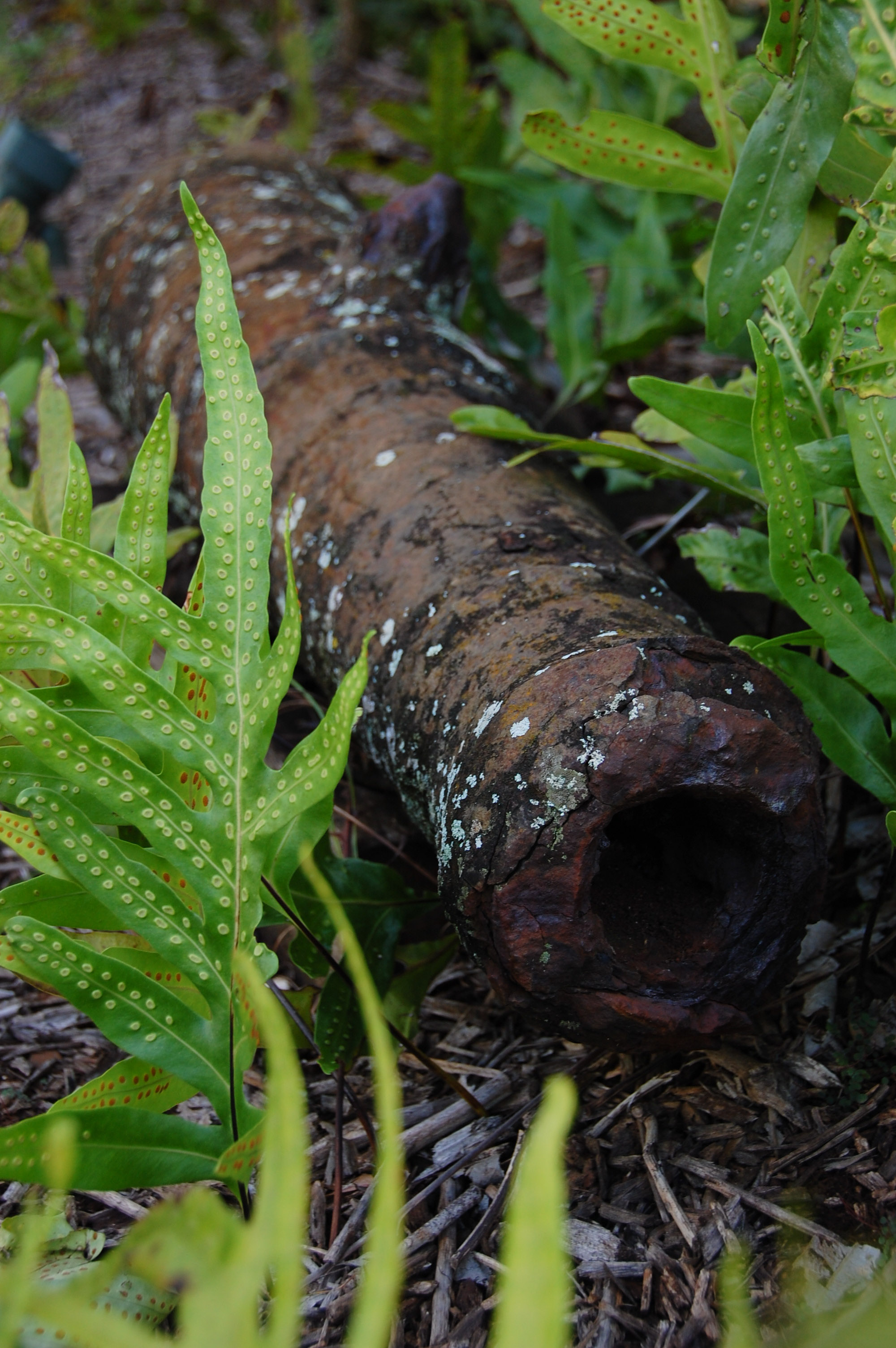
A cannon, discovered in the ʻĪao Valley, that is thought to be one used in the battle.

The Battle of Kepaniwai ("Battle of the Dammed Waters of ʻĪao" or Kaʻuwaʻupali, "Battle of the Clawed Cliffs") was fought in 1790 between the islands of Hawaiʻi and Maui. The forces of Hawaiʻi were led by Kamehameha I, while the forces of Maui were led by Kalanikūpule. It is known as one of the most bitter battles fought in Hawaiian history.

While Maui's King Kahekili II was on Oʻahu, Kamehameha's war fleet landed in Kahului a few kilometers from the base of ʻĪao Valley. An army consisting of around twelve hundred skilled warriors led by Kamehameha and Kekuhaupiʻo, advanced on Kahekili's son Kalanikūpule and other Maui chiefs blocking the ʻĪao valley. The two armies were evenly matched and neither side broke after two days of fighting. On the third day, Kamehameha's army was helped by the use of two cannons (named "Lopaka" and "Kalola") operated by John Young and Isaac Davis, two of Kamehameha's royal advisors. Although none of Maui's major chiefs were killed, many people died resulting in the "damming of the waters" by the corpses floating in the river. It was said that the river "ran red with the blood of the dead." Chiefess Kalola and her granddaughter Keōpūolani were able to escape west through the valley to Olowalu and north to Lahaina.

After the battle, Kalola offered her 11-year-old granddaughter to Kamehameha as a future wife. Meanwhile, Keōua Kūʻahuʻula, the last independent chief on the Island of Hawaiʻi, who had been raiding Kamehameha's territory, quickly returned to the Big Island. This resulted in the 1790 battles of East Hawaiʻi and the 1791 battle of Kawaihae.

Kahekili II resumed his rule of Maui and also acquired cannons. In 1791, Kahekili tried to invade the island of Hawaiʻi, but was defeated in a naval battle called Kepuwahaʻulaʻula (Battle of the Red-Mouthed Gun). Kamehameha had to wait for the civil war that broke out in 1793 after the death of Kahekili II, and the battle of Nu'uanu to finally win control of Maui.
