= Sigismund Bacstrom =

- Born: c. 1750; Germany
- Died: 1805; England
- Occupations: Doctor, surgeon, naturalist, translator

Signature
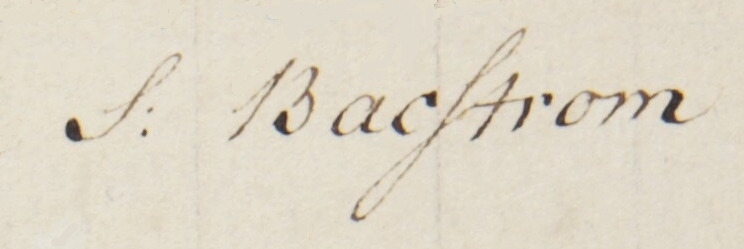

Sigismund Bacstrom (c. 1750–1805) was a medical doctor, a surgeon, and an artist of the early Maritime Fur Trade. His drawings of the people and places he encountered on his voyages show the meticulous precision of a surgeon and scientist rather than the hand of a trained artist. He was also a prominent author and translator of documents on Alchemy and Rosicrucianism, many of which are still in print.

== Early history ==
Little is known of Bacstrom’s early history. His name is probably Swedish, but he is believed to have been born in the Holy Roman Empire. He claimed to have been trained as a physician, surgeon and chemist at the University of Strausbourg. He served as a surgeon in the Dutch navy from 1763 to 1770, then moved to England.

Bacstrom was employed by the famous naturalist Joseph Banks as a secretary from 1772 to 1775, accompanying the naturalist on a scientific exploration of Iceland. He was then engaged by Captain William Kent of the Royal Navy, a friend of Joseph Banks and collector for him, until 1779. Over the next decade he made at least six voyages as surgeon on merchant vessels, including voyages to Greenland (Spitsbergen), Guinea, and Jamaica.

In the late 1780s Bacstrom found a patron, whose name is unknown, who established him in an expensive laboratory in Marylebone to conduct research in natural philosophy. When his sponsor died in 1789, Bacstrom again found himself without work. He eventually received sponsorship to collect samples for Banks on a voyage around the world via Cape Horn, Nootka Sound, China and the East Indies that was to be undertaken by a group of London merchants as a commercial venture.

== Pacific voyage ==
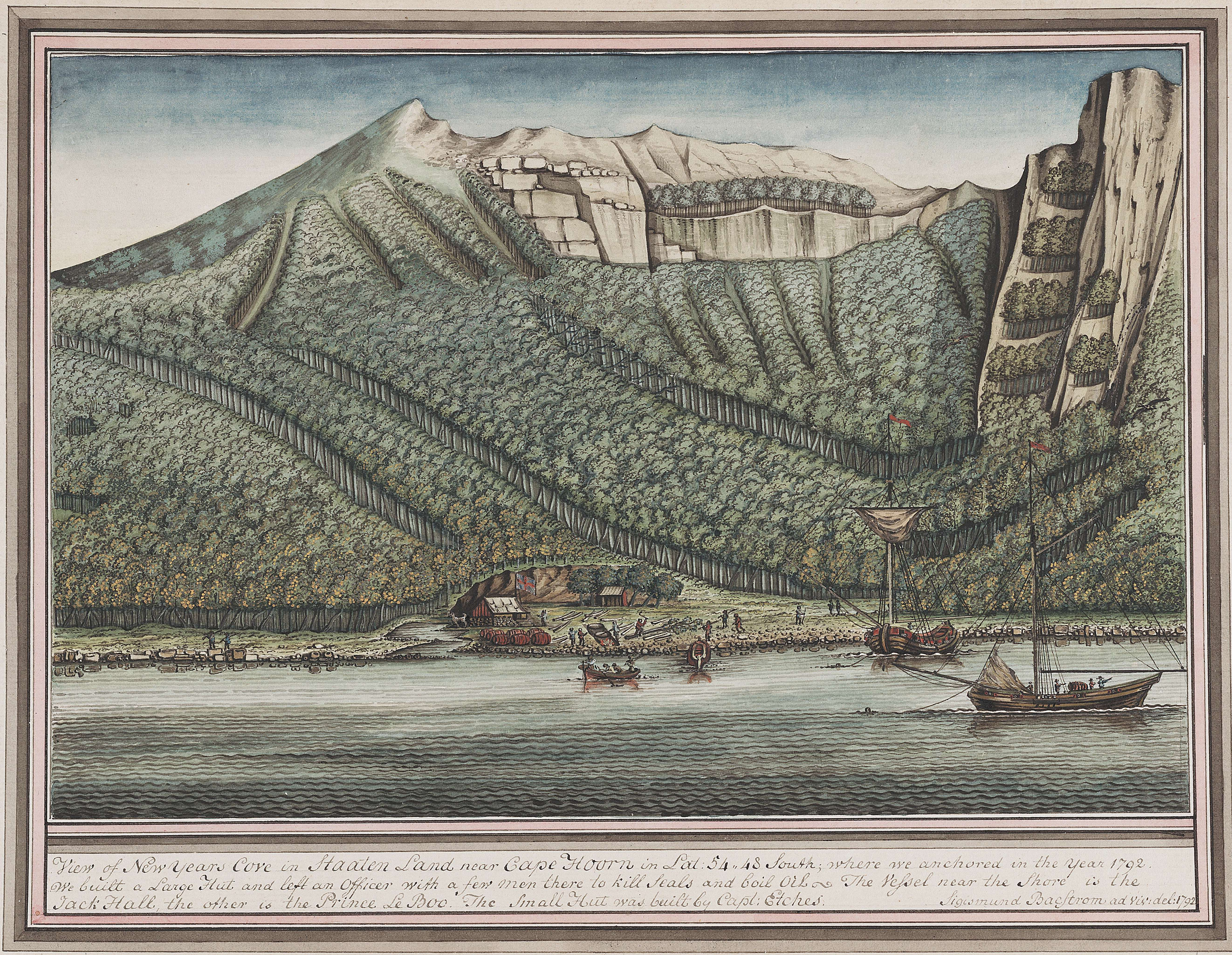
Sealing camp, Cape Horn, Jackal and Prince Lee Boo

The vessels chosen for this voyage were the Butterworth, a former French frigate of 392 tons, a large sloop named the Jackal (sometimes written as Jackall or Jack Hall), and a smaller sloop named Prince Lee Boo, all under the command of Captain William Brown. They sailed from England in late 1791. By March 1792 they were encamped on Staten Island near Cape Horn, slaughtering seals and boiling their oil.

They sailed across the Pacific to the Marquesas Islands in June, reaching Vancouver Island on the Northwest coast of North America in July 1792.

Bacstrom left the Butterworth at Nootka on Oct. 15 “on account of the ill and mean usage I received from Capt. W. Brown and his Officers.”

He was briefly a guest of the Spanish officers at Nootka before being welcomed on board the Three Brothers, a brig out of Newcastle, sailing with the schooner Prince William Henry. On the Three Brothers, Bacstrom sailed up into Haida Gwaii and into Southeast Alaska near what is now Sitka. There are many drawings from this period of the voyage.

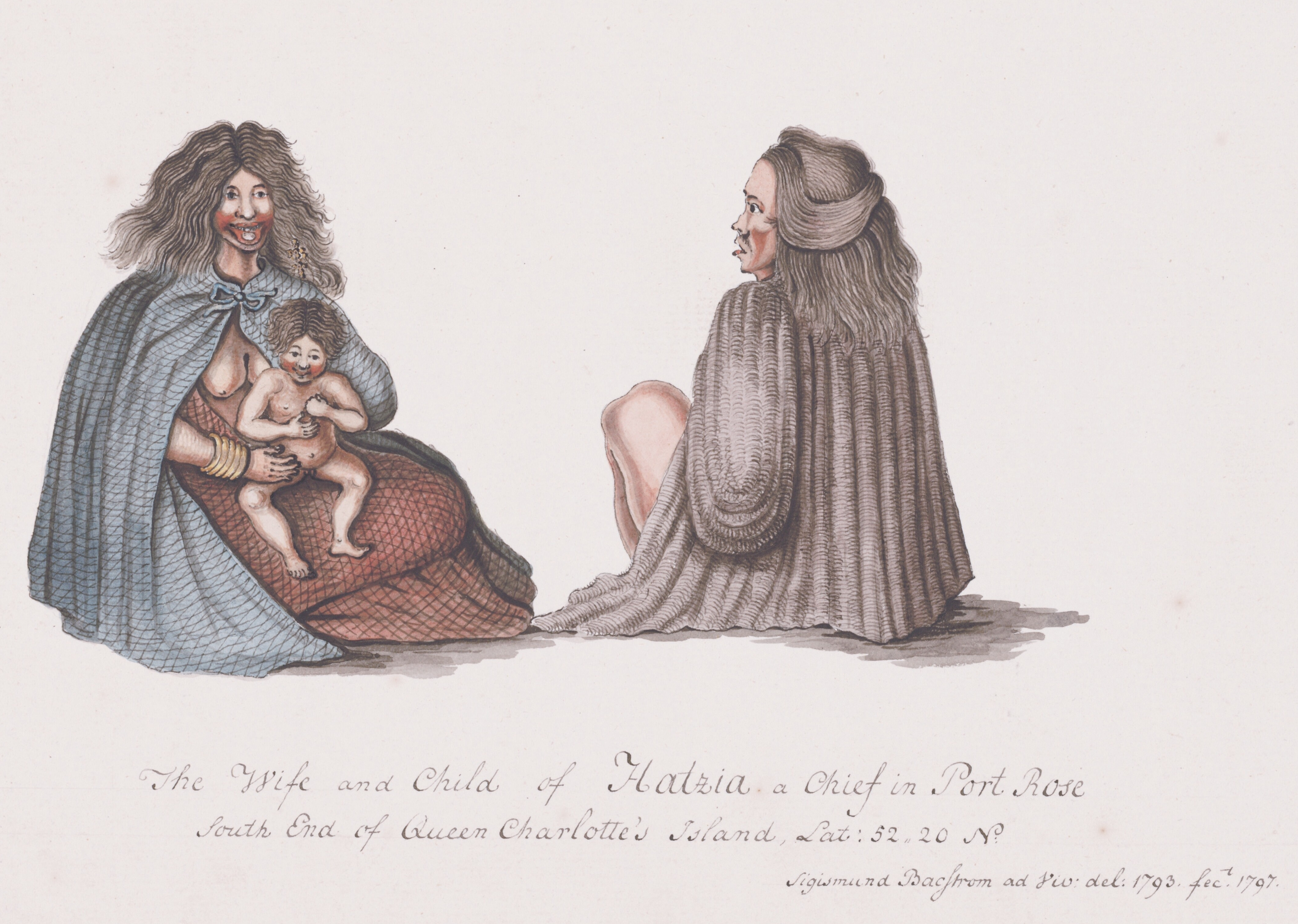
The wife and child of Hatzia a chief in Port Rose South End of Queen Charlotte's Island c. 1793

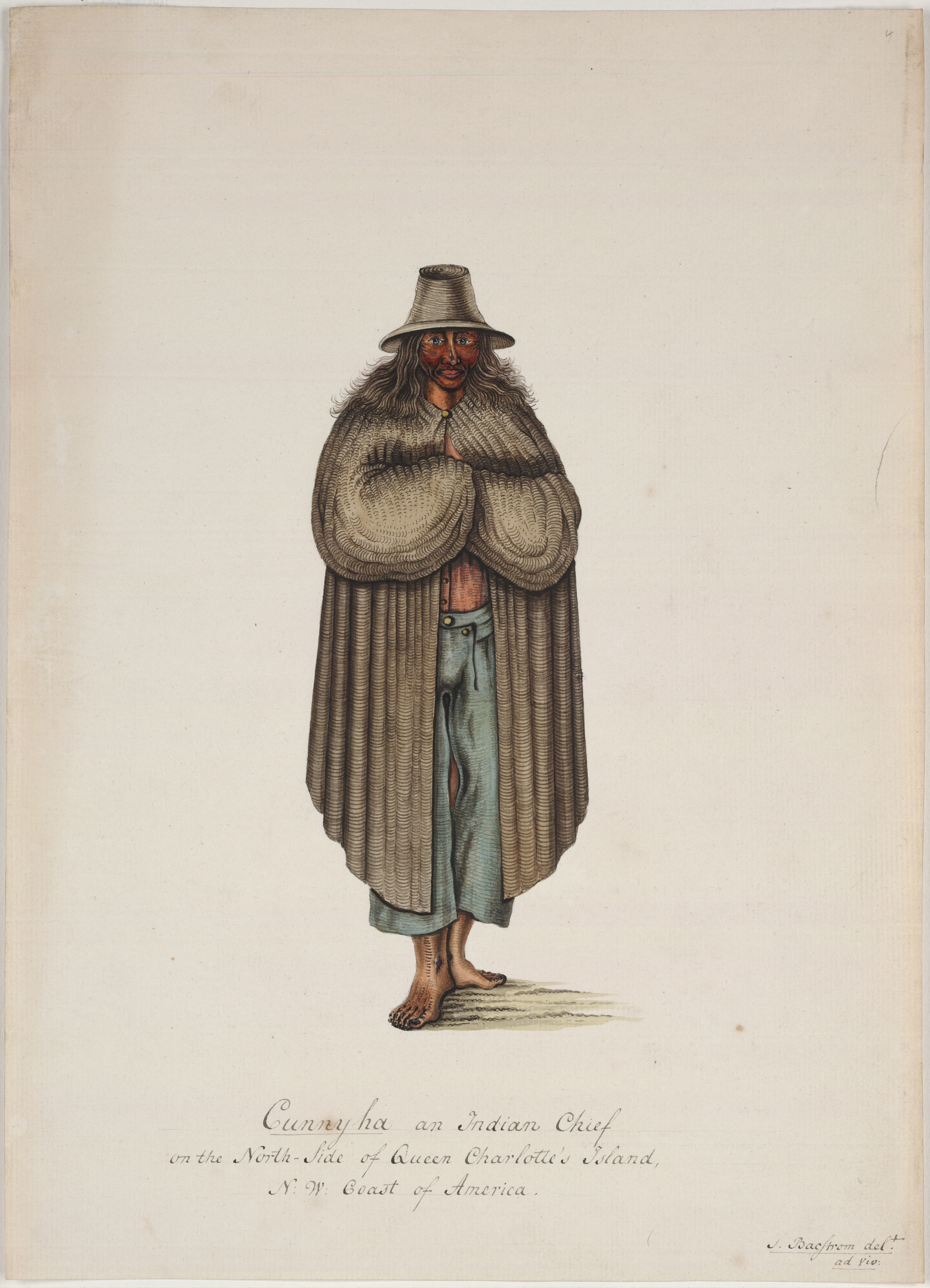
Cunnyha an Indian Chief on the North-Side of Queen Charlotte's Island, N.W. Coast of America,

Returning to Nootka Sound, Bacstrom took passage as surgeon on the American flagged brig Amelia for China. But just outside Macao she was stopped by the British cruiser HMS Lion, and her true papers were found to be French. She was therefore seized as a British prize of war, leaving Bacstrom stranded in Canton.

He eventually signed on as surgeon aboard the Warren Hastings, an ex-East Indiaman of 600 tons flying Genoese colors, with a British captain, and a crew from 13 different nations, bound for the Cape of Good Hope and Ostend. But, led by the French chief mate, the French, Spanish, Portuguese and Italian crew mutinied and took possession of the ship, confining Bacstrom and others below deck as prisoners. They then sailed to Mauritius where the ship and her cargo were condemned as a French prize of war.

After six months in Mauritius, Bacstrom was able to buy passage on an American ship bound for New York, but his ship was once again captured by a British naval ship, this time in the Virgin Islands, and once again the ship and cargo were seized as a prize of war.

Thanks to help from the governor of the British Virgin Islands, George Leonard, Bacstrom eventually arrived home in London July 23, 1795, four years and eight months after he left.

== Alchemy and Rosicrucianism ==
Sigismund Bacstrom is considered by some to be “one of the most important scholars of alchemy in the last few centuries.” While in Mauritius, Bacstrom was initiated and admitted into the Fraternity of Rosicrucians. on 12 September 1794 by the Comte Louis de Chazal This Comte de Chazal is said to have been 96 years old at the time of Bacstrom's initiation according to McLean. His alchemical knowledge is said to have been transmitted to him in 1740 in Paris, and John W. Hamilton Jones suggests in the introduction to Bacstrom's Alchemical Anthology that Chazal's teacher is said to have been none other than the Count of St. Germain.

On returning to London, he proceeded to support himself by publishing both prints of his drawings from his voyages and esoteric texts. He translated Latin, German and French alchemical works into English and worked with members of the Societas Rosicruciana in Anglia and the Theosophy of the 19th century, according to Hockley. Bacstrom's translation of Catena Aurea Homeri (Golden Chain of Homer) was published by Helena Petrovna Blavatsky in 1891 in the Theosophical magazine Lucifer. According to Adam McLean, Alexander Tilloch (1759–1825), the founder of the Philosophical Magazine which published Bacstrom's travelogue in 1799, had been a student of Bacstrom. McLean reports in his article that Tilloch's admission document matches almost verbatim with the corresponding document for Bacstrom, giving further indication that the group of Rosicrucians in England around 1800 known as “Bacstrom Society” actually existed. A remarkable feature of this document is, as McLean notes, the 4th promise insures not to exclude women from initiation.

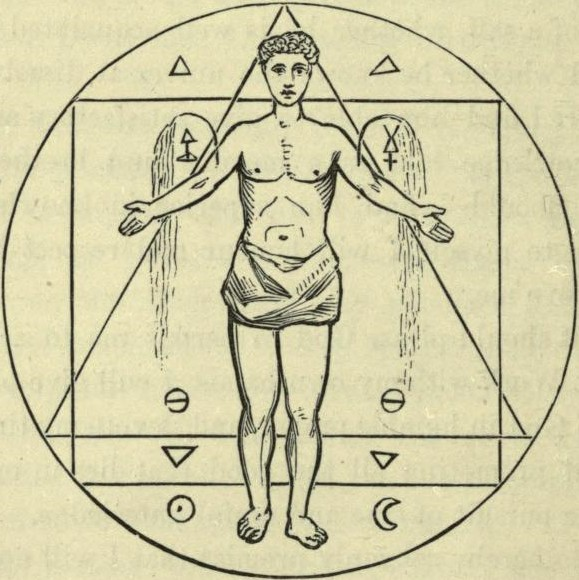
Lectorium Waite Logo

New symbol of Lectorium Rosicrucianum

"As there is no distinction of sexes in the spiritual world, neither amongst the blessed Angels nor among the rational immortal spirits of the Human race... our Society does not exclude a worthy woman from being initiated, God himself not having excluded women from partaking of every felicity in the next life."

The similarity of the "Philosophical Seal" of the Bacstrom Society of Rosicrucians depicted in Waite (a triangle and square inscribed in a circle) with the emblem used by the Lectorium Rosicrucianum today is also striking.

Among Bacstrom's circle of associates in London were the physician and astrologer Ebenezer Sibly (1751 – c. 1799) and the General Charles Rainsford (1728–1809). From Frederick Hockley, Bacstrom's writings probably came into the hands of William Alexander Ayton (1816–1909), William Wynn Westcott and Samuel Liddell MacGregor Mathers, thus influencing the teachings of the Hermetic Order of the Golden Dawn, and thus in turn influencing the development of Western occultism in the 20th century.

A collection of Bacstrom's manuscripts and other alchemical writings was acquired by Manly Palmer Hall in 1923. After his death in 1990 they were sold to the J. Paul Getty Museum in Malibu. A bibliography of the Hall's collection appeared in 1986. Digitised manuscripts are available in the Internet Archive.

An authentic copy of a long letter of Sigismond Bacstrom and sent to Mr. Hand has been handwritten by Frederick Hockley in 1839: the Mr. Yardley's Process. Then, this manuscript has been bought in 1913 by the famous bookseller Pierre Dujols and given to Julien Champagne, the illustrator of Fulcanelli's books. Julien Champagne wrote the French translation of the Mr. Yardley's Process in front of the English text in blank frames that have been previously drawn by Frederick Hockley on all verso pages. After more than one century, this manuscript owned by Champagne's family has been published in facsimile by Éditions Les Trois R (France, 2015–2016).

== Later years ==
Bacstrom died in 1805.
