= Battle of Nuʻuanu =

1795 battle on Oʻahu

Coordinates: 21.2330°N 157.7877°W

- Part of Unification of Hawaiʻi
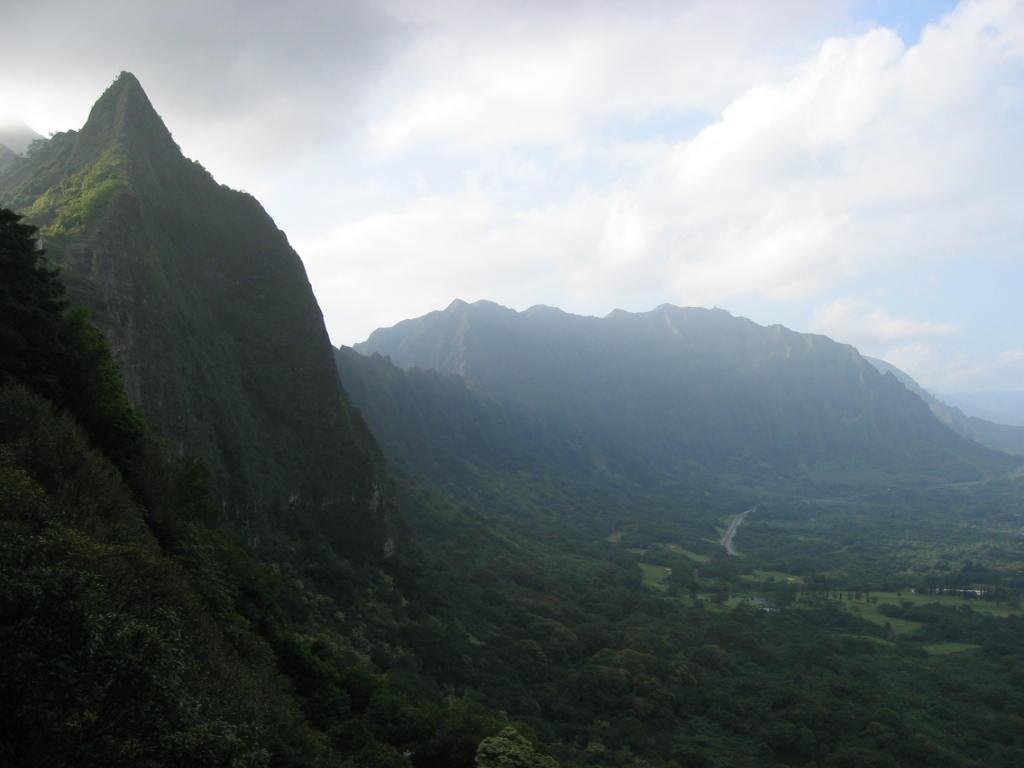
- Windward side of the Pali
Date	May 1795
Location	Oʻahu, Hawaiʻi
Result	Kamehameha I victory

Belligerents
Kamehameha I's army	Oʻahu army Kaʻiana's defector army

Commanders and leaders
Kamehameha I	Kalanikupule; Kaʻiana †

Strength
10,000–16,000	Unknown

Casualties and losses
- ~5,000 – 12,000 for both combatants

The Battle of Nuʻuanu (Hawaiian: Kalelekaʻanae; literally "the leaping mullet"), fought in May 1795 on the southern part of the island of Oʻahu, was a key battle in the final days of King Kamehameha I's wars to conquer the Hawaiian Islands. It is known in the Hawaiian language as Kalelekaʻanae, which means "the leaping mullet", and refers to a number of Oʻahu warriors driven off the cliff in the final phase of the battle. There are "varied and sometimes conflicting histories of the Battle of Nuʻuanu."

== Prior to the battle ==
=== Oʻahu ===
Around the year 1792 (the exact date is unknown; the landing could have been as late as February 1795), Captain William Brown, an English merchant, landed in the harbor of Honolulu. As a maritime fur trader and gun seller, he made several voyages before from the Pacific Northwest coast to the Hawaiian islands in command of the Butterworth Squadron. Captain Brown landed several vessels on the island; the ones noted are the two sloops Prince Lee Boo and the Jackall.

After landing, he made an agreement with Kahekili II (the chief of the island at that time) that he would offer his military assistance against Kamehameha for use of the harbor. Likewise, Kamehameha requested military assistance and the use of artillery from Captain George Vancouver and in exchange "ceded" the island of Hawaiʻi to Great Britain in February 1794.

The two rival chiefs never met again, as Kahekili II died in mid-1794. At this point, Kahekili's son, Kalanikupule, had control of the island of Oʻahu and his half-brother, Kaʻeokulani, had control of the islands of Kauaʻi (through his wife), Maui, Lanaʻi, and Molokaʻi.

After Kahekili's death, Kaʻeokulani decided to visit Kauaʻi, his home island. In order to accomplish this, he had to travel through the way of Oʻahu. Kalanikupule then set up trenches and earthworks on the windward side of Oʻahu, where Kaʻeokulani's canoes would pass. Both sides fought, but the battle was stopped by Kalanikupule and the two chiefs met to mourn over the death of Kahekili.

Kaʻeokulani then discovered a plot to be thrown overboard by his chiefs on the way to Kauaʻi. To resolve the issue, he proposed war against Kalanikupule. This war was called Kukiʻiahu and lasted from November 16 until December 12, 1794. He ordered his men to make a land march to where Kalanikupule was stationed. In the early part of December 1794, Kaʻeokulani's army was confronted by Kalanikupule's, along with the artillery of Captain Brown's ships. With Kaʻeokulani being outnumbered and outmaneuvered, his forces fled and scattered to the mountains. Thus Kaʻeokulani's army was destroyed.

After Kaʻeokulani's defeat, a dispute arose with Captain Brown over payment. Brown and several of his men were killed, and Kalanikupule took possession of the Jackal and the Prince Lee Boo, together with all their arms. After three weeks of preparation, on January 4, 1795, Kalanikupule set sail for Hawaii with a fleet of canoes and the two ships, intending to make war on Kamehameha.

But the ships' crews recaptured the vessels while they were at anchor off Waikīkī. They sailed for Hawaiʻi where they told Kamehameha all that had happened. They traded Kamehameha all of Kalanikupule's weapons, which had remained in the ships, in return for supplies.

Kalanikupule had received prior warnings of the impending invasion from the chiefs of Maui and Molokaʻi and had begun building several lines of fortifications on Oʻahu. He had already begun buying muskets and cannons from European traders, but had far fewer than Kamehameha. He was also assisted by one of Kamehameha's chiefs, Kaʻiana, who defected before the battle began. Kaʻiana had fallen out of favor with Kamehameha's inner circle and feared that he was being plotted against. On the voyage to Oʻahu, his army split off from the Hawaiian armada and landed on the north side of the island. There, they began cutting notches into the Nuʻuanu mountain ridge, which would serve as gunports for Kalanikupule's cannons.

=== Kamehameha ===
Kamehameha I had begun his campaign to dominate the island chain under his rule in 1783, but prior to 1795 had only managed to unify the island of Hawaiʻi (the "Big Island"). However, the civil war on Oʻahu after Kahekili II's death left the Oʻahu kingdom greatly weakened.

During this time, Kamehameha had been equipping his army with modern muskets and cannons, as well as training his men in their use under direction of British sailor John Young. In February 1795 he assembled the largest army the Hawaiian Islands had ever seen, with about 12,000 men and 1,200 war canoes. Kamehameha initially moved against the eastern islands of Maui and Molokaʻi, conquering them in the early spring of 1795. Then he invaded Oʻahu.

== Battle ==
The Battle of Nuʻuanu began when Kamehameha's forces landed on the southeastern portion of Oʻahu near Waiʻalae and Waikiki. After spending several days gathering supplies and scouting Kalanikupule's positions, Kamehameha's army advanced westward, encountering Kalanikupule's first line of defense near the Punchbowl Crater. Splitting his army into two, Kamehameha sent one half in a flanking maneuver around the crater and the other straight at Kalanikupule. Pressed from both sides, the Oʻahu forces retreated to Kalanikupule's next line of defense near Laʻimi. While Kamehameha pursued, he secretly detached a portion of his army to clear the surrounding heights of the Nuʻuanu Valley of Kalanikupule's cannons. Kamehameha also brought up his own cannons to shell Laʻimi. During this part of the battle, both Kalanikupule and Kaʻiana were wounded, Kaʻiana fatally. With its leadership in chaos, the Oʻahu army slowly fell back north through the Nuʻuanu Valley to the cliffs at Nuʻuanu Pali. Caught between the Hawaiian Army and a 1,000-foot (305-meter) drop, over 700 Oʻahu warriors either jumped or were pushed over the edge of the pali (cliff). In 1898 construction workers working on the Pali road discovered 800 skulls which were believed to be the remains of the warriors that fell to their deaths from the cliff above in 1795.

== Aftermath ==
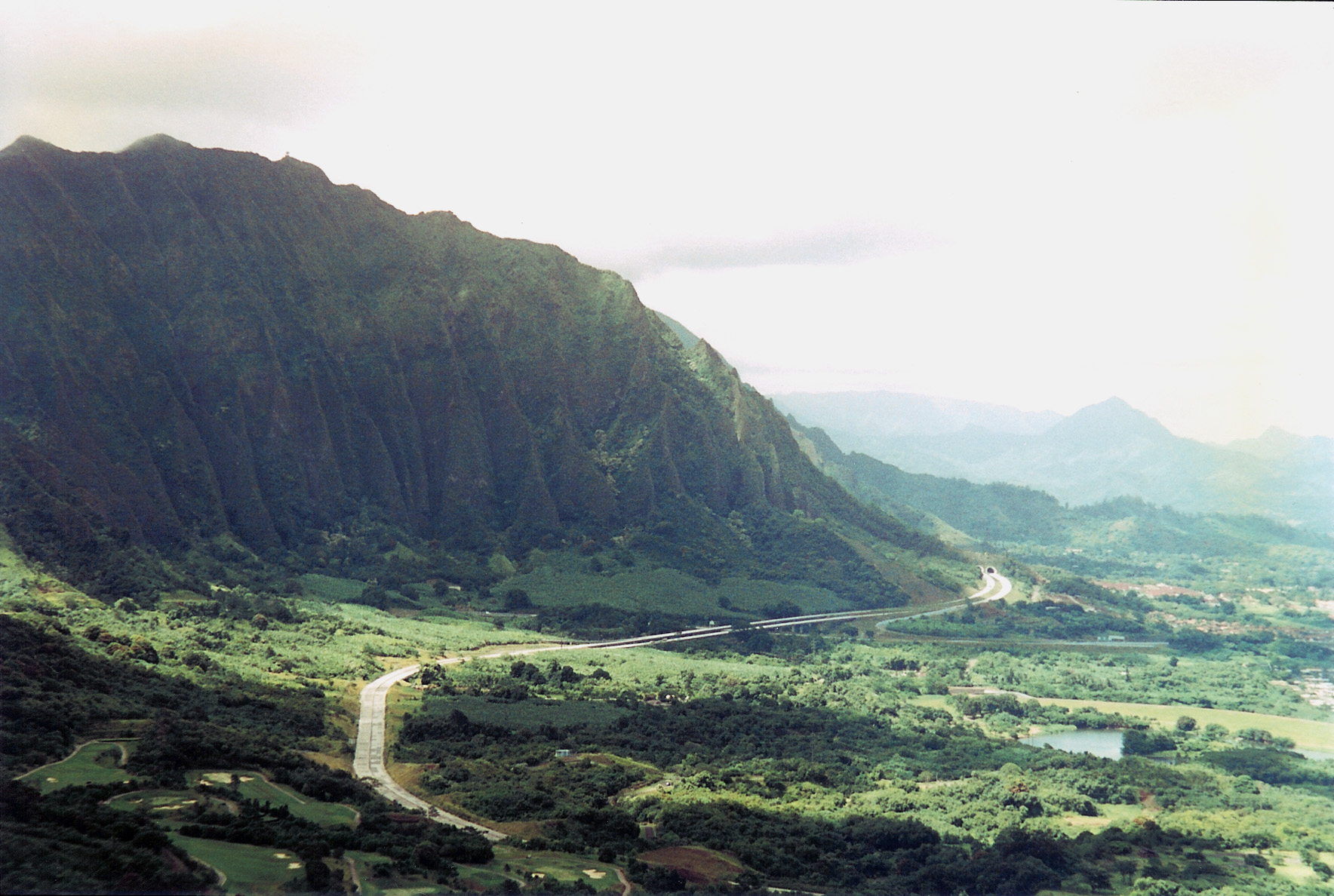
Cliffs of the Koʻolau Range as seen from Nu‘uanu Pali in 1996

Though he escaped the battle, Kalanikupule was later captured. This battle was the climax of Kamehameha's campaign; after this battle his kingdom was for the first time referred to as the "Kingdom of Hawaiʻi." The islands were still not united because Kamehameha had yet to capture the neighboring islands of Kauaʻi and Niʻihau. First he had to put down an uprising on the island of Hawaiʻi, and then he began his preparations for the conquest of Kauaʻi. However, before Kamehameha could invade Kauaʻi, King Kaumualiʻi of Kauaʻi submitted to him, giving Kamehameha effective control over all of the Hawaiian Islands.
