= Kalanikūpule =

Hawaiian ruler (1760–1795)

Kalanikūpule (c. 1760–1795) was the Aliʻi nui of Maui and King of Oʻahu. He was the last king to engage in combat with Kamehameha I over the Hawaiian Islands. Kalanikūpule was the last of the longest line of aliʻi nui in the Hawaiian Islands. In Hawaiian his name means "the heavenly prayer of Kū".

== Early life ==
Kalanikūpule was the eldest son of Kahekili II and his wife Kauwahine. His father had gained control of all of the Hawaiian Islands except the island of Hawaiʻi. His father had overthrown the king of Oahu and had established his base at Waikīkī. Kamehameha declared war on Maui and fought Kalanikūpule at the Battle of Kepaniwai. Kalanikūpule, facing imminent defeat, fled over a narrow mountain pass along with his high chiefs, and they sailed to Oʻahu. Kahekili began his war preparations. Kamehameha's troops returned to Hawaiʻi Island, and soon Kahekili was able to regain Maui and Molokaʻi back. In July 1794 Kahekili died.

== Reign ==
Following the death of his father, Kalanikūpule took Oʻahu while his uncle Kaeokulani gained control of Maui, Lānaʻi, and Molokaʻi. When his uncle decided to visit his wife's home on Kauaʻi, he sailed from Maui by way of Oʻahu, taking his army with him. When his uncle reached Oʻahu he stopped at Waimanalo. Disputes — partly over inheritance of the Kingdom of Maui — arose between him and Kalanikūpule, resulting in war. Kalanikūpule was in a desperate situation.

At this time, three foreign ships arrived. Two of these vessels, the Jackal and the Prince Lee Boo were British sloops under the command of Captain William Brown and Captain Robert Gordon. The third vessel, the Lady Washington, was an American snow with Captain John Kendrick in command. These were not strangers in the islands as foreign trading vessels were frequent visitors to Hawaiʻi. It was Captain Brown who was given credit for discovering the harbor of Honolulu and naming it Fair Haven. Jackal and Prince Lee Boo were the tenders to the ship Butterworth, and were the first Western vessels to enter Honolulu harbor.

Kalanikūpule asked Captain Brown for assistance to his army. The Captain decided to help him, as did the two mates of the Jackal and the Prince Lee Boo. These men aided Kalanikūpule’s force in what was later called the Battle of Kalauao. The muskets of the sailors drove Kaeo’s warriors into hills that overshadowed Honolulu. They finally retreated into a little ravine. Kaeo tried to escape, but Brown’s men and Kendrick’s men saw his ʻahu ʻula, his scarlet and yellow feather cloak, and fired at Kaeo from their boats in the harbor to show his position to Kalanikūpule’s men. The Oʻahu warriors killed Kaeo along with his wives and chiefs.

This was a successful move, and the battle ended with Kalanikūpule as the victor. Captain Brown fired a salute to celebrate the victory. At least one gun was loaded with shot which pierced the side of the American ship Lady Washington, killing Captain Hendrick and several of his crew.

Encouraged by the victory over his uncle, Kalanikūpule decided to acquire the Jackal and the Prince Lee Boo and military hardware to aid in his attack on Kamehameha on the island of Hawai'i. Kalanikūpule killed Brown and Gordon and abducted the remainder of his crew.

== Kalanikūpule's demise ==
Kalanikūpule planned an immediate attack on the island of Hawaiʻi. The crews of the two ships were ordered to get the ships ready to sail. This was done. He, his wife, and their retinue then went on board and took possession of their new vessels. The two mates of the English ships decided that they, with their crews, would try to recapture the ships. This was a daring venture, but they succeeded. The natives were either killed or driven from the ships, with the exception of Kalanikūpule and his queen and their personal attendants. Near dawn, the ships were put out to sea. While still ashore, the king and queen were placed in a canoe and set afloat. The ships sailed on to the island of Hawaiʻi, where the two mates secured supplies. They left a letter for John Young and Isaac Davis, informing to them of the situation on Oʻahu, and sailed at once for Canton.

Knowing his enemy's disadvantage, Kamehameha used his strong army and his fleet of canoes and small ships to conquer Maui, Lānaʻi, and Molokaʻi from Kalanikūpule's rule in 1794. Kamehameha's next target was the Kalanikūpule's base at Oʻahu. As Kamehameha prepared for war, one of his former allies, a chief named Kaʻiana, turned on him and joined forces with Kalanikūpule. Kamehameha's warriors and Kalanikūpule fought a great battle at the summit of Nuʻuanu Pali which is known as the Battle of Nuʻuanu. Following his defeat, Kalanikūpule hid in the mountains for several months before being captured and sacrificed to Kamehameha's war god, Kū-ka-ili-moku. His death brought the end of the Kingdom of Maui.

Preceded by Kaeokulani	Mōʻī of Maui; 1794 - 1795	Succeeded by Kamehameha I as King of Hawaiian Islands
Preceded by Kahekili II	Ruler of Oʻahu; 1793 - 1795	Succeeded by Kamehameha I as King of Hawaiian Islands
