= Aliʻi nui of Oʻahu =

Sovereign and supreme ruler of Oʻahu

The aliʻi nui of Oʻahu was the sovereign and supreme ruler of one of the four main Hawaiian Islands. The monarchs of the Island of Oʻahu, like those of the other islands, claim descent from Wākea. Oʻahu was unified under the aliʻi nui in the 15th century.

Nanaulu, a fourteenth generation descendant of Wakea, was the ancestor of Kumuhonua, the first known king of Oʻahu, brother of Moikeha, King of Kauai of the second dynasty. In 1783, Oahu was conquered by the King Kahekili II of Maui whose son Kalanikūpule was, in turn, conquered by King Kamehameha I in 1795 at the Battle of Nuʻuanu. Many times the kings of Oahu had hegemony over the island of Molokai and used it as summer getaway. It was Oʻahu who brought forth the first Mo'iwahine or Queen regnant of any of the Hawaiian Islands.

== List of aliʻi nui of Oʻahu ==
- Māweke
- Mulielealiʻi
- Kumuhonua
- Elepuʻukahonua
- Hoʻokupohokano
- Nawele
- Lakona
- Kapae-a-Lakona
- Haka
- Maʻilikūkahi
- Kālonaiki
- Piliwale
- Kūkaniloko (female)
- Kalaʻimanuʻia (female)
- Kūamanuia
- Kahikapuamanuia
- Kākuhihewa
- Kānekapu a Kākuhihewa
- Kaʻihikapu a Kākuhihewa, 1640-1660
- Kahoʻowahaokalani, 1660-1680
- Kauākahiakahoʻowaha, 1680-1690
- Kūaliʻi Kunuiakea Kuikealaikauaokalani, 1690-1730 A.D.
- Kapiʻiohoʻokalani, 1730–1737
- Kanahāokalani, 1737–1738
- Peleʻioholani (King of Kauai 1730–1770), 1738–1770
- Kūmahana, 1770–1773
- Kahahana, 1773–1783
- Conquered by Maui and ruled by Kahekili II and Kalanikūpule 1783–1795
- Conquered by Kamehameha I in 1795

== See also ==
- Ancient Hawaiʻi
- Kingdom of Hawaiʻi
- List of aliʻi of Koʻolau
