= Piliwale =

Hawaiian nobleman

Piliwale (pronunciation: Peeh-leeh-vah-leh) was an ancient Hawaiian nobleman, the High Chief of the island of Oahu. He was a member of the House of Maʻilikākahi, being the descendant of Maʻilikākahi. It is most likely that Piliwale lived in the 16th century.

== Biography ==
Chief Piliwale (Hawaiian: Aliʻi Piliwale) was born on the island of Oʻahu (in the 16th century?). His parents were High Chief Kālonaiki of Oʻahu and his consort, Kikinui-a-ʻEwa, whose genealogy is unknown today. Piliwaleʻs paternal uncle was High Chief Kalamakua of Halawa, whilst Piliwaleʻs aunt-in-law was famous Princess Keleanohoanaʻapiʻapi of Maui, who also married Piliwaleʻs brother, Prince Lō-Lale.

After the death of Kālonaiki, the grandson of Maʻilikākahi, Piliwale became a ruler of Oʻahu. He married a woman named Paʻakanilea (Paʻa-kani-lea), who was maybe his own sister. Paʻakanilea and Piliwale were the parents of Princess Kūkaniloko and Princess Kohepalaoa (Kohipalaoa) of Oʻahu. It was Kūkaniloko who succeeded Piliwale on the throne of Oʻahu. It is believed she was the first Chiefess suo jure of one Hawaiian island, although there were already chiefesses of the part of the island of Oʻahu, namely Hinakaimauliʻawa and her daughter Mualani, and Piliwaleʻs ancestress Maelo.

== See also ==
- Alii nui of Oahu

Preceded by Kālonaiki	High Chief of Oʻahu	Succeeded by Kūkaniloko
