= Aliʻi nui of Kauaʻi =

The aliʻi nui of Kauaʻi was the sovereign ruler of the islands of Kauaʻi and Niʻihau.

== Overview ==
The monarchs of Kauaʻi, like those of the other Hawaiian islands, claim descent from Wākea and his wife Papa. Nanaulu, a descendant in the fourteenth generation from Wakea, was the ancestor of Moikeha but his dynasty was supplanted after two generations. The second, or Puna dynasty was established by Laʻa-mai-kahiki, eleventh in descent from Puna-I-Mua who was twenty-fourth in descent from Wakea. Of course, every aliʻi lineage is ancient, but the northern kingdoms produced the great bloodlines that everyone wanted to graft into, including Kamehameha. Theirs is the "bluest blood", and the kingdoms they created, while very much like the kingdoms that Kamehameha's grandparents and parents created, had a slightly different culture. The last aliʻi nui of Kauaʻi of the old uninterrupted line of Puna was Kaweloaikanaka. After his overthrow by Kaweloamaihunalii and that monarch's eventual death, the kingdom of Kauaʻi fell to Kualii of Oahu.

In 1810, Kaumualiʻi, negotiated a peaceful end to his power with King Kamehameha I of Hawaii, in an effort to avoid bloodshed. The agreement allowed Kaumualiʻi to remain aliʻi nui until his death, when all lands would revert to Kamehameha's heir. After Kamehameha I's death, King Kamehameha II renegotiated the same deal and took no lands. This outraged Kaʻahumanu who came to the island after Kamehameha II had left and kidnapped Kaumualiʻi, taking him to Honolulu in 1821. After his death in 1824, his son George Kaumualiʻi took back his birth name Humehume and attempted to re-establish an independent on Kauaʻi, but was also eventually captured and taken to Honolulu.

== List of aliʻi nui of Kauaʻi ==
The known independent rulers were:

- Moikeha
- Haulanuiaiakea
- Laʻamaikahiki
- Ahukini-a-Laʻa,
- Kamahano
- Luanuʻu
- Kukona, 1350–1380 – sovereign of Kauai when Kalaunuiohua of Hawaiʻi invaded Kauaʻi. Kalaunuiohua made his descent on the coast of Koloa and was met in battle by Kukona's army. Kalaunuiohua's army was defeated and taken prisoner.
- Manokalanipō, 1380–1410
- Kaumakaʻamano, 1410–1430
- Kahakuʻaʻkane, 1430–1460
- Kuwalupaukamoku, 1460–1480
- Kahakumakapaweo, 1480–1510
- Kalanikukuma, 1510–1540
- Kahakumakaliua Hakumakaliua, 1540–1560
- Kamakapu, 1560–1580
- Kawelo-mahamahaia, 1580–1600
- Kawelomakualua, 1600–1620
- Kaweloaikanaka, 1620–1650
- Kawelo-a-Maihuna-aliʻi, usurper (c.1650 – 1670)
- Kuike-ala-i-keuoʻo-o-kalani ʻUnu-i-akea Kūaliʻi, 1670–1730
- Peleʻioholani, 1730–1770
- Kamakahelei, (female) 1770–1794
- Kaumualiʻi 1794–1810

== See also ==
- Ancient Hawaiʻi
- Kingdom of Hawaiʻi
- Aliʻi Aimoku of Oʻahu
- Aliʻi Aimoku of Molokaʻi
- Aliʻi Aimoku of Maui
- Aliʻi Aimoku of Hawaiʻi
