= Peleʻioholani =

Peleʻioholani of Oʻahu
- Aliʻi nui of Oʻahu and Kauaʻi
- Reign: 1730–1770 (on Kauaʻi); 1737–1770 (on Oʻahu)
- Predecessor: Kualiʻi (on Kauaʻi); Kanahaokalani (on Oʻahu)
- Successor: Kamakahelei (on Kauaʻi) Kūmahana (on Oʻahu)
- Born: 1690
- Died: 1770 (aged 79–80)
- Spouse: Halakiʻi; Lonokahikini
- Issue: Kalanipoʻo-a-Peleʻioholani; Kaʻapuwai; Keʻelaniʻihonuaiakama; Kūmahana; Kuwalu
Names
- Peleʻioholani
- Father: Kūaliʻi Kunuiakea Kuikealaikauaokalani
- Mother: Kalanikahimakeialiʻi

Peleʻioholani (1690–1770) was a Hawaiian High Chief, the 21st Aliʻi nui of Kauai and the 25th Aliʻi nui of Oahu. He ruled an empire stretching from Niʻihau to Molokaʻi. According to ancient traditions, Peleʻioholani was a descendant of Hema and Māweke.

== Name ==
Peleʻioholani is sometimes called Peleʻiholani. Early Western sailors to Hawaiʻi such as Captain James Cook called him Perreeorannee.

== Reign ==
At its greatest sizes, during Peleʻioholani's reign, the empire of Oʻahu island stretched from Niʻihau, in the west, to the District of Koʻolau, on Molokaʻi, in the east; although power were nominal no matter the size.

He ruled as titular chieftain of Kauaʻi, Oʻahu and held tributary over Molokaʻi after he conquered that island and slew the Molokaʻian chiefs for killing his daughter Keʻelaniʻihonuaiakama.

== Family ==
The parents of Peleʻioholani were High Chief Kūaliʻi Kunuiakea Kuikealaikauaokalani and his wife Kalanikahimakeialiʻi and he had a sister called Kukuiaimakalani.

Kūmahana was a son of Peleʻioholani by his first wife Halakiʻi. Another wife of Peleʻioholani was named Lonokahikini. Peleʻioholani's daughters were Kuwalu, Kalanipoʻo-a-Peleʻioholani, Kaʻapuwai and Keʻelaniʻihonuaiakama. Kuwalu was the mother of Chief Ahu-a-ʻI.

A possible granddaughter of Peleʻioholani was Kamakahelei, who succeeded him as Aliʻi nui of Kauaʻi.

== See also ==
- Gideon Peleioholani Laanui

Preceded by Kūaliʻi	Aliʻi nui of Kauaʻi; 1730–1770	Succeeded by Kamakahelei
Preceded by Kanahaokalani	Aliʻi nui of Oʻahu; 1737–1770	Succeeded by Kūmahana
