= Aliʻi of Koʻolau =

The Aliʻi of Koʻolau were the rulers of Koʻolau Range on the island of Oahu, in ancient Hawaii. Ancient Hawaiians believed that the Chiefs of Koʻolau were the descendants of the god named Wākea. Chiefs could have different noble ranks; those who were born from the unions of full siblings had the highest known rank. The first ruler of Koʻolau was High Chief Kalehenui.

== List ==
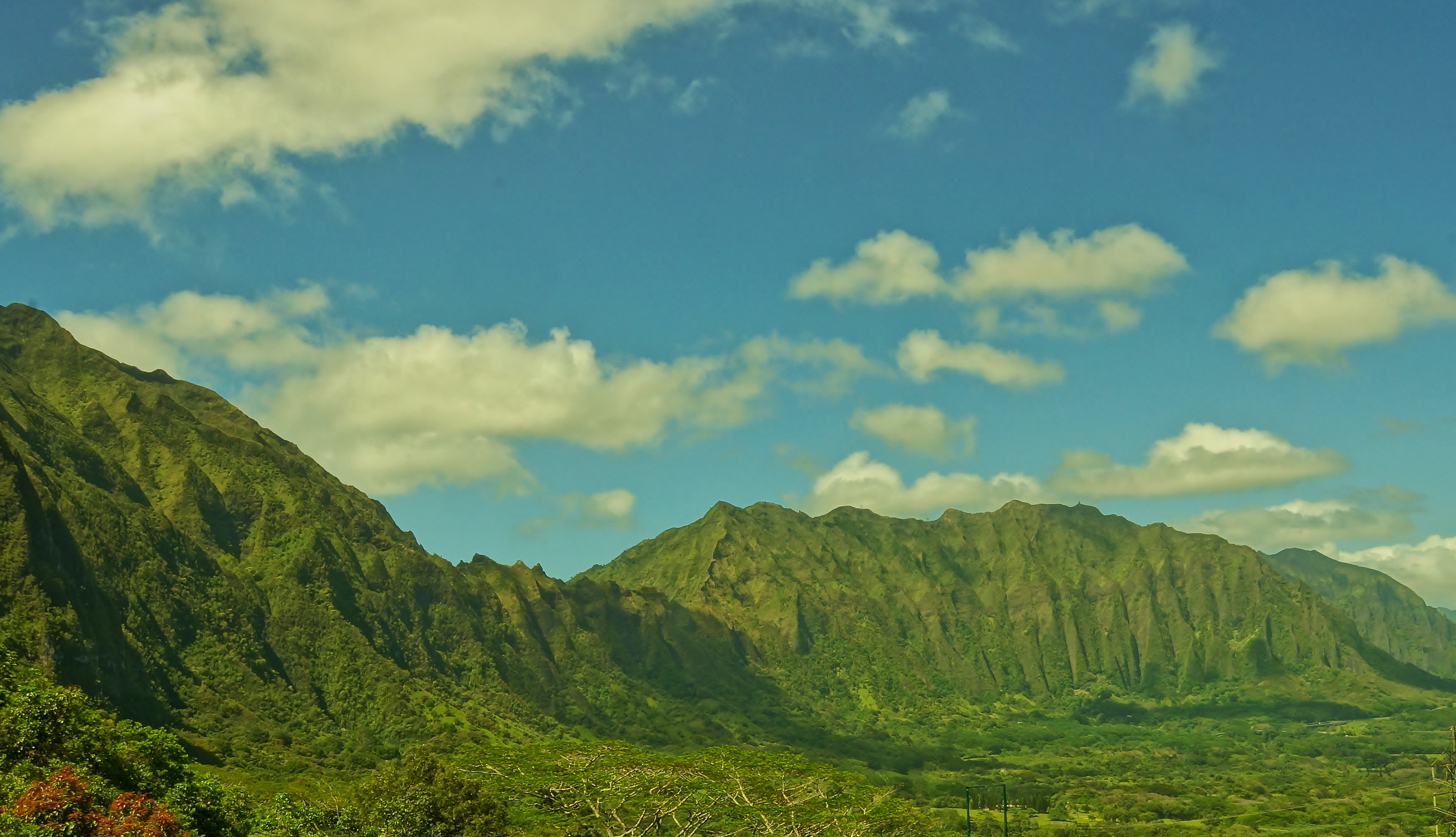
Koʻolau Range

- Kalehenui — child of Maweke (a wizard from Tahiti)
- Hinakaimauliʻawa (female) — child of Kalehenui and Kahinalo
- Mualani (female) — child of Hinakaimauliʻawa and Kahiwakaʻapu
- Kua-o-Mua — child of Mualani and Kaomealani I
- Kawalewaleoku — child of Kua-o-Mua and his sister, Kapua-a-Mua; considered a deity
- Kaulaulaokalani — child of Kawalewaleoku and Unaʻula
- Kaimihauoku (female) — child of Kaulaulaokalani and Kalua-i-Olowalu
- Moku-o-Loe — son of Kaimihauoku
- Kalia-o-kalani (Kahoakalani-o-Moku) — child of Moku, and husband of Kua-a-ʻohe
- Ke-opu-o-lani (Kupualani) — consort of Kaohi-a-kanaka
- Kupanihi — husband of Kahua-o-kalani
- Lua-poluku — son of Kupanihi, and husband of Mumu-ka-lani-ohua
- Ahu-kai
- Maʻe-nui-o-kalani
- Kapikiʻo-kalani
- Holaulani (Kauaohalaulani) (female)
- Laninui-a-Kaʻihupeʻe
- Hoalani
- Ipuwai-o-Hoalani (female)

== See also ==
- Ancient Hawaii
- Aliʻi
