= Kamakahelei =

- Aliʻi Nui of Kauaʻi
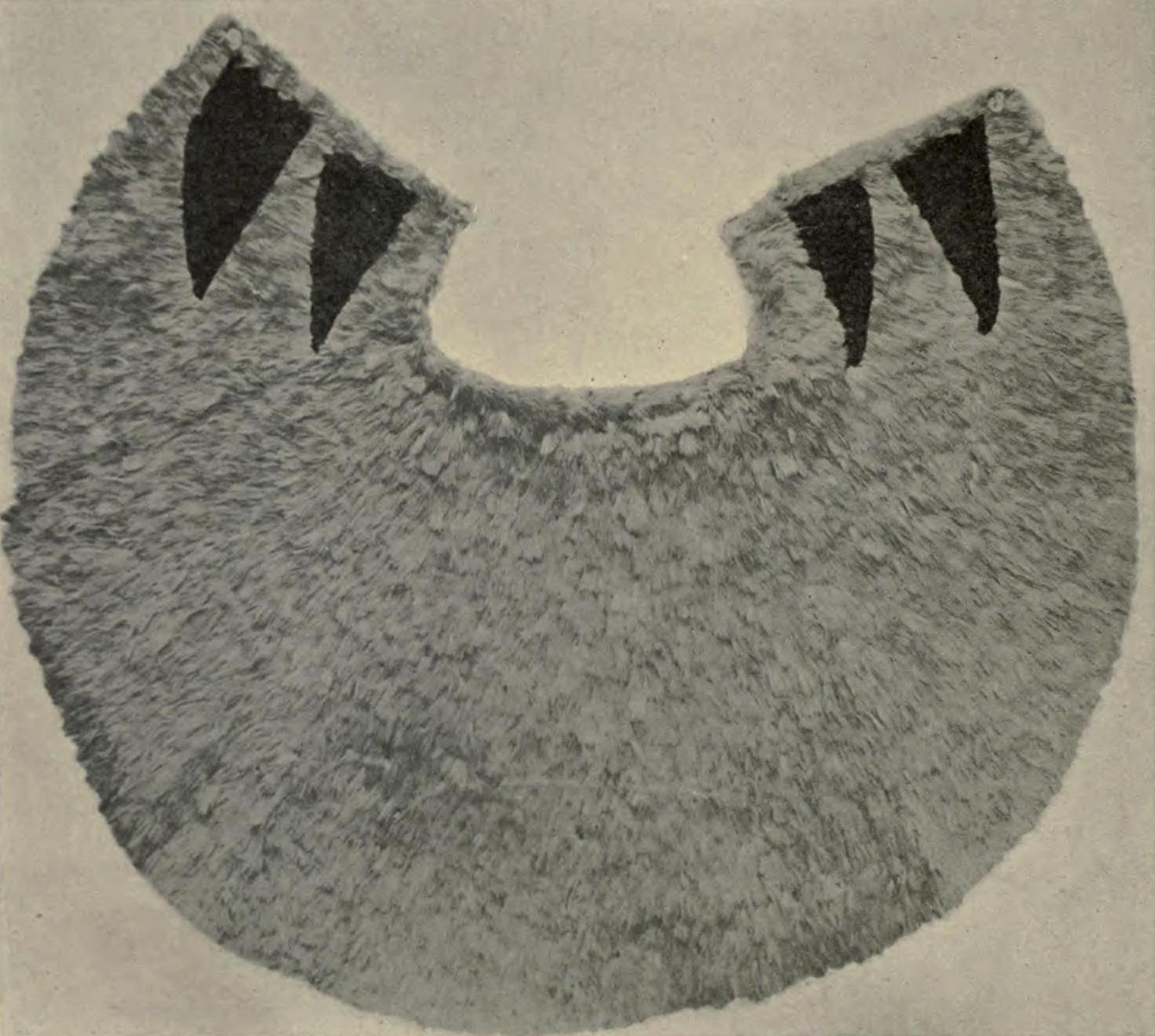
- The ʻahuʻula (feather cape) of Kamakahelei, Bishop Museum

Aliʻi Nui of Kauaʻi
- Reign: 1770-1794
- Predecessor: Peleʻioholani
- Successor: Kaumualiʻi
- Born: c. 18th century
- Died: 1794
- Spouse: Kaneoneo; Kāʻeokūlani
- Issue: Lelemahoalani; Kapuaʻamohu; Kaumualiʻi; Ikekelei'aiku; Namakaokahaʻi
- Father: Kaumeheiwa
- Mother: Kaʻapuwai

Kamakahelei (c. 18th century - 1794), was the 22nd aliʻi nui, or High Chiefess regnant, of the island of Kauaʻi. She was the ruling chiefess of Kauaʻi from 1770 - 1794. In some historical references she has been described as a regent for her sons Keawe and Kaumualiʻi. She was the sovereign of the island of Kauaʻi at the time Captain James Cook landed on its shores. The Chiefess Kamakahelei Middle School in the district of Puhi is named after her. This school serves the Kalaheo to Hanamaulu districts on the island of Kauaʻi.

== Biography ==
Kamakahelei was one of three daughters of High Chief Kaumeheiwa, the son of High Chief Lonoikahaupu and High Chiefess consort Kamuokaumeheiwa, and his wife, High Chiefess consort Kaʻapuwai, possibly the daughter of Peleiʻoholani, Aliʻi nui of Oahu and Aliʻi nui of Kauai. According to tradition, her grandfather Lonoikahaupu was five generations in descent from the 13th Aliʻi Aimoku of Kauai, Kalanikukuma. His family had traditionally ruled in Waimea and the south-western section of the island, although always in subordination to the elder line of Kauaʻian chiefs. It is unclear why Kamakahelei succeeded Peleiʻoholani as the Aliʻi of Kauaʻi. It is not certain that she was his granddaughter or a close relative. The legends remain silent between the transaction of rule between the two dynasties.

She first married Kaneoneo, Peleʻioholani's grandson and the pretender to the throne of Oʻahu of the Kūaliʻi line. He had rights to the succession to Kauaʻi, but it is not known if he contended with his wife over the rule of the island. Kaneoneo's father, Kūmahana, was deposed by the ʻEwa chiefs, who replaced him with Kahahana. The latter was the last chief of Oahu.

She and her first husband had two daughters: Lelemahoalani and Kapuaʻamohu. Kaneoneo died during the rebellion on Oʻahu against Mauʻi chief Kahekili II in the year 1785 or 86.

Kamakahelei next married Kāʻeokūlani, a prince of Maʻui and brother of Kahekili II. They had a son Kaumualiʻi. Together they united rule of the island of Niʻihau, her husband's domain, and the island of Kauaʻi.

== Successors ==
After Kamakahelei's death in 1794, her husband Kāʻeokūlani may have briefly taken regency over his son as he did his nephew Kalanikūpule's inheritance of Mauʻi. Kāʻeokūlani died the same year, killed at the Battle of Kukiiahu, at Kalauao, Oʻahu on December 12, 1794. Her son Kaumualiʻi continued to ruled the kingdom of Kauaʻi independently until he consented to becoming a vassal of Kamehameha the Great.

Preceded by Peleiʻoholani	Aliʻi Nui of Kauaʻi; 1770 - 1794	Succeeded by Kaumualiʻi
