= Kumuhonua =

- Issue: Elepuʻukahonua
- Father: Mulielealiʻi
- Mother: Wehelani

Chief Kumuhonua (or Kumu-Honua) was a High Chief in ancient Hawaii, who was Aliʻi Nui ("king") of Oahu, one of the Hawaiian Islands, and is mentioned in the chants. He was named after the first man in Hawaiian mythology.

== Biography ==
Kumuhonua was a son of the High Chief Mulielealiʻi of Oahu. Mulielealiʻi was a son of the famous wizard Maweke from Tahiti.

Kumuhonuaʻs mother was called Wehelani, and Kumuhonuaʻs siblings were Chief Moʻikeha of Kauai, Chief ʻOlopana and Princess Hainakolo. ʻOlopana went to Tahiti.

It seems that Kumuhonua was the eldest child of his parents. His mother was also married to his paternal uncle Keaunui of ʻEwa, whom she bore Nuʻakea of Molokai. Kumuhonua was related to the Chiefess Mualani of Koʻolau Range.

Chief Kumuhonua started his own dynasty on Oʻahu. According to the judge Abraham Fornander, Kumuhonua had four sons; their mother is unknown.

Sons of Kumuhonua:

- Elepuʻukahonua, Chief of Oʻahu
- Molohaia
- Kahakuokane
- Kukawaieakane

== Myth ==
Some nobles entered into the myths — according to one myth, Kumuhonua was vexed with the goddess Haumea for snatching god Wākea away from his warriors after he had been seized in Kalihi Valley for taking wild bananas.
