= Haka of Oʻahu =

- Spouse: Kapunawahine
- Issue: Kapiko-a-Haka, Prince of Oʻahu
- Parents: Kapae-a-Lakona; Wehina

Chief Haka (Hawaiian: Aliʻi Haka; Hawaiian pronunciation: Hah-kah; born ca. 14th century) was a High Chief of the Hawaiian island of Oahu, in ancient Hawaii. He is mentioned in old legends and chants.

== Biography ==
Haka was born on Oʻahu, most likely in the 14th century.

His father was High Chief Kapae-a-Lakona of Oʻahu, son of the Chief Lakona of Oahu. Thus, he was from the House of Maweke. Haka's mother was Wehina; she was Kapae-a-Lakona's consort.

Haka married Kapunawahine (wahine = "woman/wife"). She became a chiefess by this marriage. She bore Haka a son, Kapiko-a-Haka. Wife of Kapiko was named Ulakiokalani. The couple produced three daughters:

- Ka’auiokalani
- Kaʻulala
- Kamili

Haka became a monarch after his father's death, and was succeeded himself by Maʻilikākahi.
