= Kūkaniloko =

Hawaiian noble lady

Aliʻi nui of Oʻahu
- Predecessor: Piliwale
- Successor: Kalaʻimanuʻia
- Born: Oʻahu
- Spouse: Luaia
- Issue: Kalaʻimanuʻia
- Father: Piliwale
- Mother: Kawaʻalaʻauaka

Kūkaniloko was an ancient Hawaiian noble lady, who became the High Chiefess (Hawaiian: Aliʻi Wahine) of the island of Oʻahu, and had a long reign.

== Biography ==
Kūkaniloko was born on Oʻahu as a daughter of High Chief Piliwale and his spouse, High Chiefess Kawaʻalaʻauaka, his sister. Kūkanilokoʻs younger sister was called Kohipalaoa; they were Piliwaleʻs only children, and he had no sons. After Piliwale's death, Kūkaniloko became the first female ruler of the whole island of Oʻahu; although there were some female rulers on Oʻahu before Kūkaniloko — like Mualani — but they ruled only over the small portion of Oʻahu.

=== Marriage ===
Kūkaniloko married a man called Luaia, who was a chief from Maui. They had at least one child — Kalaʻimanuʻia, who became the High Chiefess of Oʻahu (after her mother's death).

== See also ==
- Aliʻi nui of Oʻahu

Preceded by Piliwale	Aliʻi nui of Oʻahu	Succeeded by Kalaʻimanuʻia
