= Women's surfing =

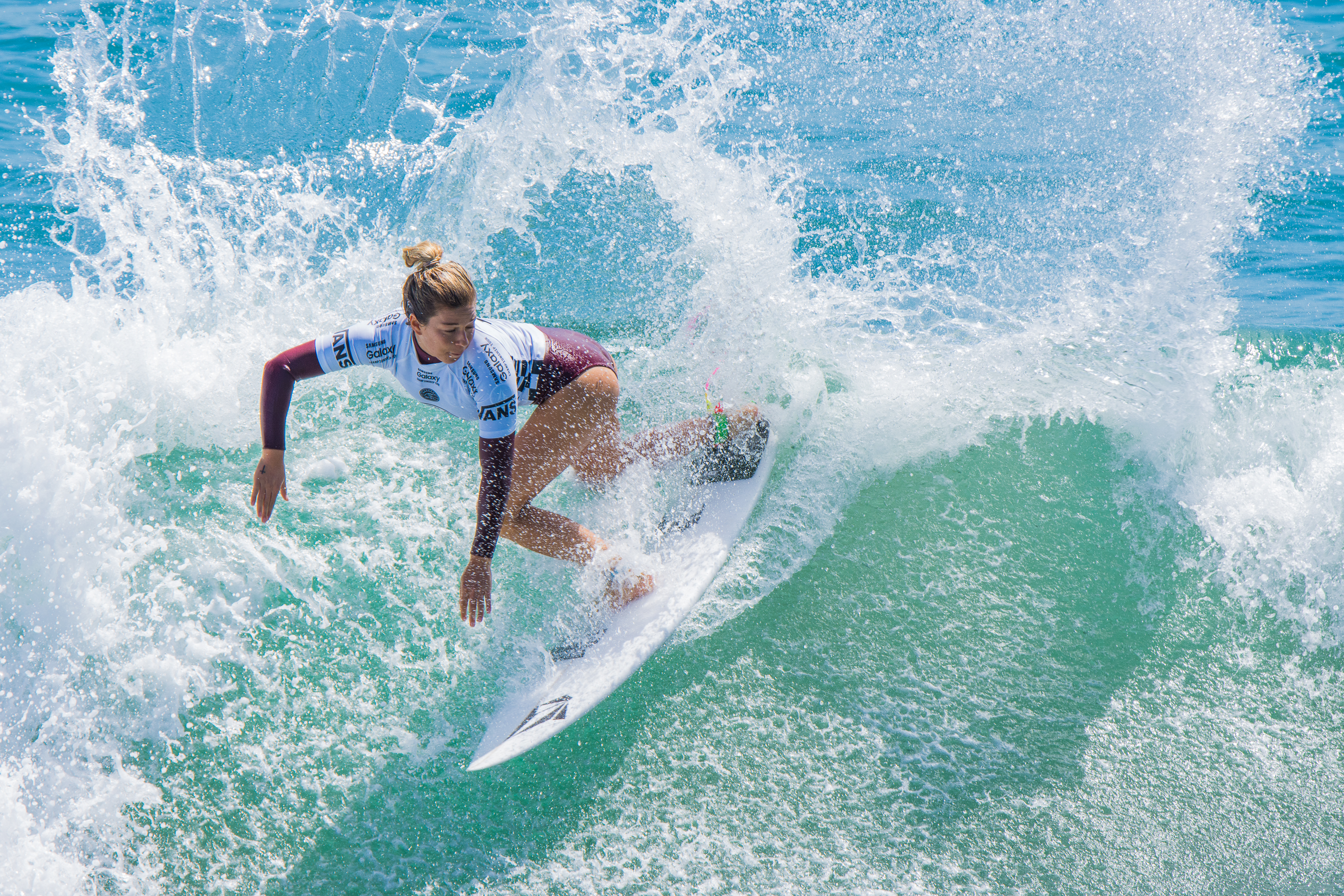
- Coco Ho surfing at the 2015 U.S. Open
- Highest governing body: International Surfing Association

Characteristics
- Mixed-sex: Yes, separate competitions

Presence
- Country or region: Worldwide
- Olympic: Yes, as of the 2020 Olympics

Women have involved themselves in surfing as old as the development of the sport itself in Hawaii continuing into written records dating as early back to the 17th century. One of the earliest records of women surfing is of princess Keleanohoanaʻapiʻapi, dubbed Maui's Surf Riding Princess, who was rumored as the trailblazer of surfing and could surf better than both men and women. A few centuries later in the mid-late 1800s, Thrum’s Hawaiian Annual reported that women in ancient Hawaii surfed in equal numbers and frequently better than men. Over the last 50 years, women's surfing has grown in popularity.

== Origin ==
Surfing most likely started in New Guinea. It was a sport full of culture, fun, and adventure. Surfing was used to explore the oceans and to have fun becoming a part of nature. It spread from New Guinea to Hawaii. It is mostly known to be practiced in Hawaii and the surrounding islands, but it has spread to the rest of the continents. It was not widely accepted by Europeans because it took time away from working and labor, although they enjoyed the excitement of seeing the action of surfing.

== Turning points ==
The California Golden Girls played a huge part in the making Women’s surfing featured. They were pivotal in the 1970 to the 1980 to making people aware of the sport and they gave a face to the once widely known “Men’s Sport.”

Surfers such as Gail Yarbrough further influenced sister sports of surfing including skateboarding. Yarbrough competed in the first National Skateboard Championships held in 1964 and later became a fixture at the Northern Oregon Coast Surf break known as "The Point," where the Pacific meets Tillamook Head. After settling in Oregon in the 1970s, Yarbrough opened a skate shop located in a horse barn on her property, in which she also built one of Oregon's first mini half pipes.

== Regions ==
Women's surfing is popular around the world in any area where surfing is possible. The World Surf League has held competitions for professional women around the world including, but not limited to, Banzai Pipeline in Hawaii, Sunset Beach in Hawaii, Peniche in Portugal, Bells Beach in Australia, Margaret River in Australia, G-Land in Indonesia, Punta Roca in El Salvador, Saquarema in Brazil, Jeffrey's Bay in South Africa, and Lower Trestles in California.

In recent years, surfing has grown in popularity among women in the Muslim world.

== Women Surfing in Media ==
Women surfing have been depicted in films, surf movies, and print media. Popular movies that feature women surfers include Soul Surfer, Gidget, Blue Crush, and Blue Crush 2. Less well-known surf videos of women include Nike Leave a Message 6.0, Proximity The Movie (featuring Stephanie Gilmore), Master and Apprentice, How Women in Surfing are Changing the World, and the quarterly magazine Wahine (1995-2001) was the first to exclusively feature women and girls. It was published in Long Beach, Calif and circulated internationally.

== Women surfers and quotations ==
- Bethany Hamilton is an American surfer that, despite getting attacked by a shark while surfing, and having her arm bitten off, did not stop her career as a surfer. She continued to get better and won many competitions following her attack.

"It's hard for me to describe the joy I felt after I stood up and rode wave in for the first time after the attack. I was incredibly thankful and happy inside. The tiny bit of doubt that would sometimes tell me you'll never surf again was gone in one wave."

- Marge Calhoun was a woman surfer who pioneered surfing in Hawaii. She is considered the first women surfing champion. She was indicted into the surfing hall of fame in 2003.
- Stephanie Gilmore is an Australian professional surfer and eight-time world champion on the Women's WSL World Tour. She started surfing at 9.
  "Fear - It's a fine line between that and pushing yourself. You definitely reach new heights when you push. But fear is good. Fear keeps us alive. If we didn't have it, we'd be doing crazy things and getting in sticky situations."
- Carissa Moore is an American professional surfer. She was the first-ever winner of the Olympic Gold Medal in women's short board surfing in 2020.
  "We all strive to find something unique and special that we are passionate about that separates us from the rest."
- Maya Gabeira is a big wave surfer who was born in Rio de Janeiro. She has five Billabong XXL Global Big Wave Award titles received from 2007–2010 and in 2012. She also won the 2009 ESPY Award for Best Female Action Sport Athlete.
- Courtney Conlogue is a 25 year old American professional surfer. In an interview with ESPN, she outlined what it takes to be a professional surfer.
  I think some people perceive surfing as just a lifestyle sport. This will be my sixth year competing professionally on the World Tour, and to be involved in something like this goes to show that we do fine-tune our bodies in order to be as strong as we can when we enter the water. During the offseason, I train three to five days a week, and then I train every day in the water. Depending on the way the swell is -- because our sport is based on Mother Nature -- when the waves are good, I surf probably six hours a day."

== Bibliography ==
- Douglas Booth, « From Bikinis to Boardshorts: "Wahines" and the Paradoxes of Surfing Culture », Journal of Sport History, vol. 28, n°1, spring 2001, pp. 3-22.
- A. Gabbard, Girl in the curl: A century of women in surfing, Seal Press, 2000.
- (in French) Anne-Sophie Sayeux, « Femmes surfeuses, paroles d'hommes surfeurs : petits arrangements dans l'ordre des genres », in L'Harmattan 2ème congrès international de la Société de Sociologie du Sport en Langue Française, L'Harmattan, Paris, 2007, pp.85-100.
- L. Heywood, in Anita Harris (ed.), « Third-wave feminism, the global economy, and women's surfing: Sport as stealth feminism in girls' surf culture », Next Wave Cultures: Feminism, Subcultures, Activism, 2008.
- Krista Comer, Surfer Girls in the New World Order, Duke University Press, 2010.
