= Lakona =

Lakona may refer to:

- Lakon or Lakona, a language spoken on Gaua island in Vanuatu
- Lakona Bay, a bay on the western coast of Gaua island in Vanuatu (where Lakon is spoken)
- Lakona of Oahu, a king
- Laakona or Lakona, Prince of Oahu, brother of Nuakea
