= Elepuʻukahonua =

Elepuʻukahonua (Olepuʻukahonua) was a High Chief of the island of Oahu in ancient Hawaii. He ruled over Oʻahu in ancient times and is mentioned in chants and legends.

His father was Chief Kumuhonua of Oʻahu, son of Chief Mulielealiʻi of the Maweke line; Maweke was a wizard from Tahiti. His mother's name is Chiefess Hainakolo.

After Kumuhonua died, Elepuʻukahonua succeeded him as a monarch of Oʻahu. It seems that this happened because he was the eldest son of his father, since he had three brothers; Molohaia, Kahakuokane and Kukawaieakane.

At some point, Chief Elepuʻukahonua married a woman named Hikilena, whose parents are not known today. She had a son, Kahokupohakano, who fathered with his spouse Kaumana II a son, Nawele, who later became a ruler of Oʻahu.

== See also ==
- Mualani, Elepuʻukahonuaʻs famous relative who became a princess of Koʻolau
