= Kaulaulaokalani =

Hawaiian nobleman

Ka-ʻulaʻula-o-kalani
- High Chief of Koʻolau
- Wife: Kalua-i-Olowalu
- Issue: Kaimihauoku
- Father: Kawalewaleoku
- Mother: Unaʻula

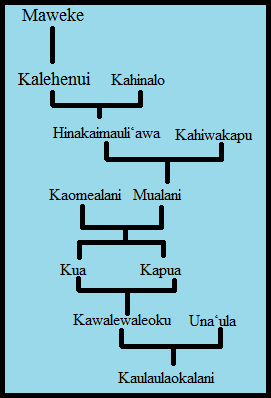
The family tree of Kaulaulaokalani

Kaulaulaokalani (also written as Ka-ʻulaʻula-o-kalani; o ka lani = "of the sky") was an ancient Hawaiian nobleman (Aliʻi), who was the High Chief of Koʻolau on the island called Oahu.

== Life ==
Kaulaulaokalani was born on Oʻahu as a son of Aliʻi Kawalewaleoku (Ka-walewale-oku) of Koʻolau and his spouse, Unaʻula, and was thus a descendant of the wizard Maweke of Tahiti. Kaulaulaokalani's grandparents were Kua-o-Mua and his wife, Kapua-a-Mua, who were the children of the Chiefess Mualani of Koʻolau and her spouse, Kaomealani I. Kawalewaleoku, being born out of the marriage between full siblings, was considered a deity and was one of the rulers of Koʻolau.

=== Reign and marriage ===
After his father's death, Kaulaulaokalani ruled over Koʻolau. During his time, over other parts of Oʻahu ruled High Chief Lakona and High Chiefess Maelo of Kona. Wife of Kaulaulaokalani was called Kalua-i-Olowalu; her parents are not known today. She and Kaulaulaokalani were the parents of the High Chiefess Kaimihauoku of Koʻolau, who was her father's successor. Kaimihauoku married a man named Loe, whose genealogy is unknown. Their son was Moku-o-Loe, ruler of Koʻolau.
