= Kalamakua =

Hawaiian nobleman

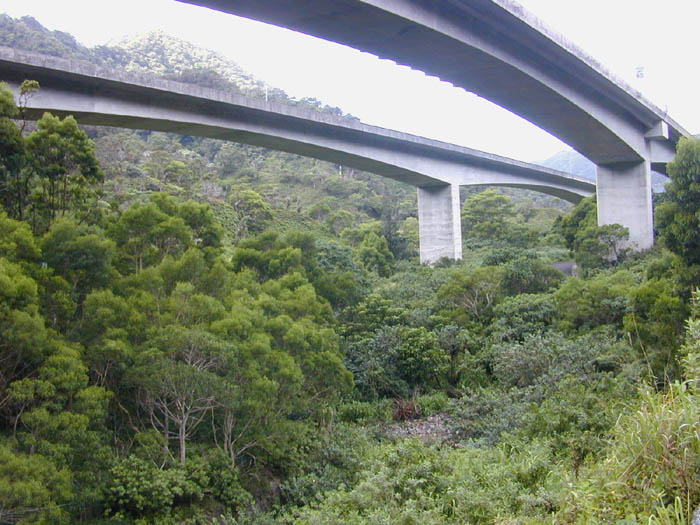
Halawa Valley

Kalamakua — also known as Kalamakua-a-Kaipuholua — was an ancient Hawaiian nobleman, the High Chief of Halawa, a place on the island of Oahu.

== Biography ==
Chief Kalamakua was born on the island named Oʻahu, in ancient Hawaii. His father was called Kālonanui; he was a son of the High Chief Maʻilikākahi of Oʻahu. The mother of Kalamakua was called Kaipuholua; she was a wife of Kālonanuiʻs.

Kalamakuaʻs brother was Prince Kālonaiki, the High Chief of Oʻahu. Kalamakua became the ruler of Halawa, whilst Kālonaiki ruled over the rest of Oʻahu. Kalamakua married Keleanohoanaʻapiʻapi, Princess of Maui. The daughter of Kalamakua and his consort was famous Laʻieloheloheikawai (born in Helemoa, Oahu), Lady of Maui as the wife of Piʻilani.

Kalamakua ordered the construction of large taro ponds in Waikiki.

== See also ==
- Piliwale, Kalamakuaʻs nephew
