= Kalehenui =

Ancient Hawaiian nobleman

Chief Kalehenui (Hawaiian for "Kalehe the Great") was an ancient Hawaiian nobleman (Aliʻi) of Tahitian ancestry, and he lived on Oahu.

He was a son of wizard Maweke (chief of the highest known rank) and his wife Naiolaukea, and thus a brother of Chiefs Mulielealiʻi and Keaunui, who was the father of the very High Chiefess Nuakea of Molokai.

It was Kalehenui who was a ruler of Koʻolau Range; dominion over Koʻolau was given to Kalehenui by Maweke.

== Marriage ==
Chief Kalehenui had married a woman called Kahinao (or Kahinalo, Kahinalu).

The only known child of Kalehenui and his spouse was Princess Hinakaimauliʻawa, who was named after goddess Hina.

The grandchild of Kalehenui was Princess Mualani.

Man	Woman	Child
Maweke	Naiolaukea	Mulielealiʻi
Maweke	Naiolaukea	Keaunui
Maweke	Naiolaukea	Kalehenui
Kalehenui	Kahinalo	Hinakaimauliʻawa
Kahiwakapu	Hinakaimauliʻawa	Mualani
Kaomealani	Mualani	Kuomua
Kaomealani	Mualani	Kapuaʻamua
Kuomua	Kapuaʻamua	Kawalewaleoku
Kawalewaleoku	Unaula	Kaulaulaokalani
