= Kaihikapu =

Kaihikapu may refer to:

- Kaʻihikapu a Kākuhihewa, an Aliʻi nui of Oʻahu
- Kaihikapu-a-Manuia, 14th Aliʻi nui of Oʻahu
