= Kālonaiki =

Kālonaiki (Hawaiian pronunciation: Kah-loh-nah-eeh-keeh) was a High Chief of the island of Oahu in ancient Hawaii, a successor of his relative, the High Chief Maʻilikākahi. He is mentioned in ancient chants as the second ruler from the House of Maʻilikākahi, and was a descendant of the Chiefess Maelo of Kona. Through him, his descendants claimed the legendary Nana-Ula as an ancestor.

== Family ==
The genealogy of Kālonaikiʻs is given in Hawaiian chants, but there are different opinions on the fact who were his parents. According to one opinion, he was a son of his predecessor Maʻilikākahi (and his consort, Kanepukoa?), but it is generally believed that he was actually Maʻilikākahiʻs grandson, a son of Maʻilikākahiʻs son Kālonanui and his wife Kaipuholua, and thus a brother of the High Chief Kalamakua of Halawa.

Kālonaiki had married a woman known as Kikenui-a-ʻEwa (or Kikinui-a-ʻEwa); her genealogy is unknown, but it is believed that she was a descendant of the High Chief ʻEwaulialaakona. She bore (three?) children to Kālonaiki:

- High Chief Piliwale of Oʻahu
- Paʻakanilea?
- Lō-Lale

== See also ==
- Alii nui of Oahu
