= Nāwele =

High Chief of Oahu island in ancient Hawaii

Nawele
- Born: Oahu, ancient Hawaii
- Spouse: Kalanimoeikawaikai
- Issue: Lakona of Oahu
- Parents: Kahokupohakano; Kaumana

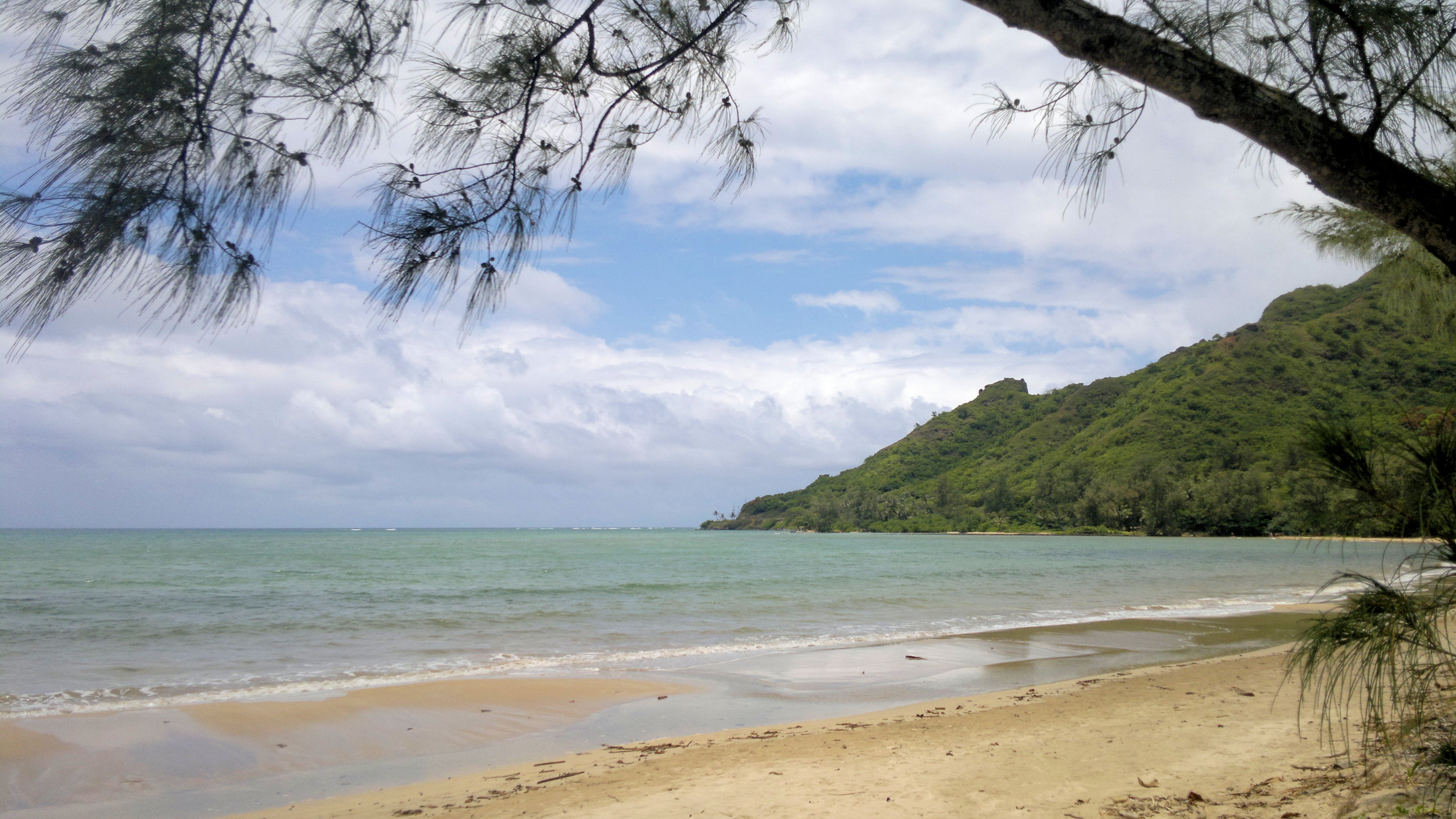
Kahana Bay on the east side of Oahu, Hawaii

Nāwele (Hawaiian pronunciation: Nah-weh-leh) was a High Chief in ancient Hawaii, a ruler of the island called Oahu. He was one of the early monarchs of Oʻahu around 1290 A.D. Nāwele was a descendant of Chief Māweke.

== Family ==
Nāwele was a son of the Prince Kahokupohakano (also known as Hoʻokupohokano) and his consort, a woman named Kaumana II, and thus a grandson of High Chief Elepuʻukahonua and his spouse Hikilena. Nāweleʻs wife was High Chiefess Kalanimoeikawaikai (Kalanimoewaiku, Kalanamowaiku, Kalanimoeikawaikaʻa). Their only known child was Nāweleʻs son and successor, Lakona of Oahu.

Although Nāwele was an ancestor of many nobles of Oʻahu, his dynasty was "replaced" by House of Maʻilikūkahi as rulers (Aliʻi nui) of Oʻahu after the death of his descendant Chief Haka of Oʻahu.

== Reign ==
After Elepuʻukahonuaʻs death, his son Hoʻokupohokano became aliʻi nui for a short period of time before his cousin Hoʻokamaliʻi, descendant of Moikeha, usurped the throne. Hoʻokamaliʻi was succeeded by his son Kahaʻi who succeeded him as aliʻi nui, the supreme ruler (Moʻi) until his cousin Nāwele reconquered O`ahu; details of his reign remain unknown. Nāwele was succeeded as aliʻi nui by Lakona, later father of High Chief Kapae-a-Lakona.
