= Hinakaimauliʻawa =

Hawaiian High Chiefess

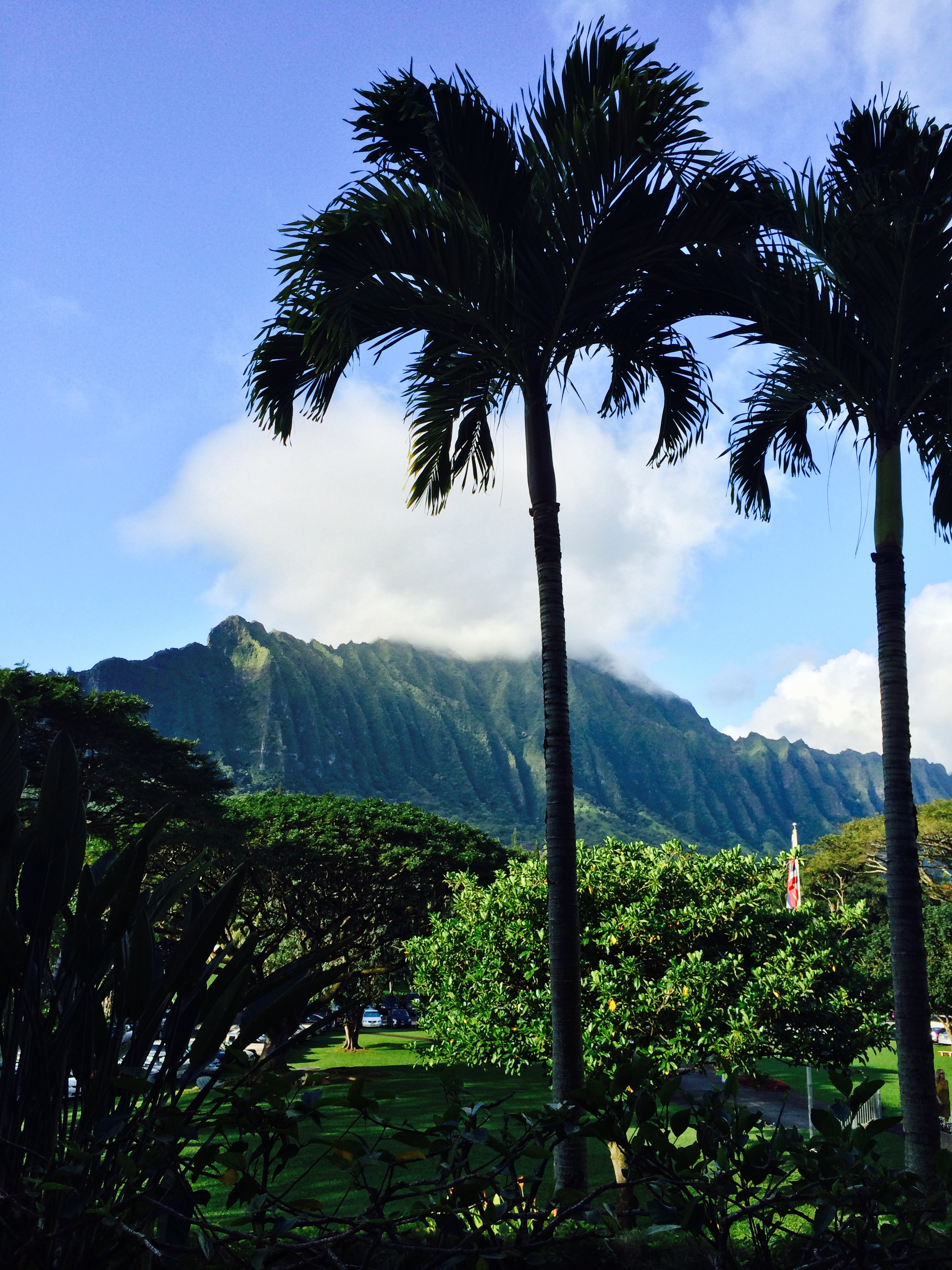
Hinakaimauliʻawa was a ruler of Koʻolau Range (it can be seen on this image)

Hinakaimauliʻawa (also spelled as Hina-kai-mauli-ʻawa) was an ancient Hawaiian High Chiefess, a Princess of Koʻolau Range on the island of Oahu. She was a member of the royal house of Maweke, who was of Tahitian ancestry, and also the first cousin of very High Chiefess Nuʻakea of Molokai.

Her parents were Chief Kalehenui of Koʻolau and his spouse, Chiefess Kahinao (Kahinalo). Hinakaimauliʻawa is their only known child mentioned in the chants and was named after goddess Hina.

Hinakaimauliʻawa married a man named Kahiwakapu (Ka-hiwa-ka-ʻapu), whose parents are unknown.

The only known child of Hinakaimauliʻawa and her husband was Princess Mualani of Koʻolau, a successor of her mother.

Preceded by Kalehenui	Princess of Koʻolau	Succeeded by Mualani
