= Keleanohoanaʻapiʻapi =

Hawaiian noblewoman

Keleanohoanaʻapiʻapi, short name Kelea, was an ancient Hawaiian noblewoman who is mentioned in ancient legends, and her genealogy is given in chants. She was a Princess (Hawaiian language: Aliʻi) of Maui, one of the Hawaiian Islands. She was a High Chiefess, but not of the highest known rank.

== Family ==
Keleanohoanaʻapiʻapi was a daughter of High Chief Kahekili I the Great of Maui and his wife, Lady Haukanuimakamaka of Kauai, and thus a sister of Chief Kawaokaohele.

== Life ==
A map of the Hawaiian Islands. Kelea was a Princess of both Maui and Oahu.

Keleanohoanaʻapiʻapi was most likely born on the island of Maui.

She was considered very beautiful and became a wife to the handsome Prince Lo Lale of Oahu, brother of Piliwale. They had three children. Lo Lale and Keleanohoanaʻapiʻapi were later divorced.

Keleanohoanaʻapiʻapi later married a noble named Kalamakua. Their daughter was La’ieloheloheikawai, wife of Piʻilani of Maui.

== Crater ==
There is a crater called Keleanohoanaapiapi on Venus.
