= Keaunui =

Ancient Hawaiian high chief

Keaunui (Hawaiian for "Keau the Great") was a High Chief of ʻEwa, Waiʻanae and Waialua in ancient Hawaii. He was a member of the Nanaulu line and is also known as Keaunui-a-Maweke.

His mother was High Chiefess Naiolaukea, also known as Naiolakea. (In ancient Hawaii, it was common for nobles to have many names.)

His father was a high chief and “wizard” called Maweke, an Aliʻi of "the blue blood".

He had brothers named Mulielealiʻi and Kalehenui.

Keaunui married a woman named Wehelani (Hawaiian: lani = "sky"), and their children were:

- High Chief Laakona of ʻEwa
- High Chiefess and "witch" Nuakea of Molokai
- High Chief and "wizard" Moʻi

Keaunui had a granddaughter, Chiefess Kapau-a-Nuʻakea of Molokai.

Keaunui is traditionally credited with opening a navigable channel at Pearl Harbor.
