= Kapae-a-Lakona =

- Spouse: Wehina
- Children: Huapouleilei
- Parent(s): Lakona of Oahu; Alaʻikauakoko

Kapae-a-Lakona (Hawaiian for: "Kapae, son of Lakona"; Hawaiian pronunciation: Kah-pah-eh; also known as Kapea-a-Lakona; born ca. 14th century) was a High Chief in ancient Hawaii, a ruler of the island of Oahu, mentioned in the chants. He ruled in the 14th century (most likely).

== Family ==
Kapae-a-Lakona was a son of the High Chief Lakona of Oahu, who was a son of Nawele.

He was thus a member of the House of Maweke from Tahiti.

His mother was lady called Alaʻikauakoko, who was a daughter of a man called Pokai and his wife Hineuki.

Kapae was married to a woman named Wehina, whose parents are not known today. Their son was Huapouleilei.
