= Nana-Ula =

Hero in Hawaiian mythology

In Hawaiian mythology, Nana-Ula or Nanaulu is the hero who led his people from Tahiti to Hawaii. He was the first King of Hawaii, and began the royal dynasty.

Kalakaua, during his reign as the last king of Hawaii, compiled the Legends and Mythology of Hawaii. He accepted the thesis of Abraham Fornander that the Polynesian "race" originated from "Aryans" in Asia Minor who emigrated to Southeast Asia via India and subsequent dispersal during the first and second centuries. These views were challenged at the time.

Their first general rendezvous was in the Fiji group, where they left their impress upon the native Papuans. Expelled from, or voluntarily leaving, the Fijis, after a sojourn there of several generations, the Polynesians scattered over the Pacific, occupying by stages the several groups of islands where they are now found. Moving by the way of the Samoan and Society Islands, the migratory wave did not reach the Hawaiian group until about the middle of the sixth century.

Nanaula, a distinguished chief, was the first to arrive from the southern islands. It is not known whether he discovered the group by being blown northward by adverse winds, or in deliberately adventuring far out upon the ocean in search of new lands. In either event, he brought with him his gods, priests, prophets and astrologers, and a considerable body of followers and retainers. He was also provided with dogs, swine and fowls, and the seeds and germs of useful plants for propagation. It is probable that he found the group without human inhabitants.

During that period——probably during the life of Nanaula——other chiefs of less importance arrived with their families and followers either from Tahiti or Samoa. They came in barges and large double canoes capable of accommodating from fifty to one hundred persons each. They brought with them not only their priests and gods, but the earliest of Polynesian traditions. It is thought that none of the pioneers of the time of Nanaula ever returned to the southern islands, nor did others immediately follow the first migratory wave that peopled the Hawaiian group.
