= Maʻilikūkahi =

Chief Maʻilikūkahi was a High Chief (aliʻi nui) of the island of Oʻahu in ancient Hawaiʻi around 1480 A.D. He is known today from the old chants as one of the early and beneficent rulers of Oʻahu.

He was the founder of the House of Maʻilikūkahi (Hawaiian: Hale o Maʻilikūkahi).

== Biography ==
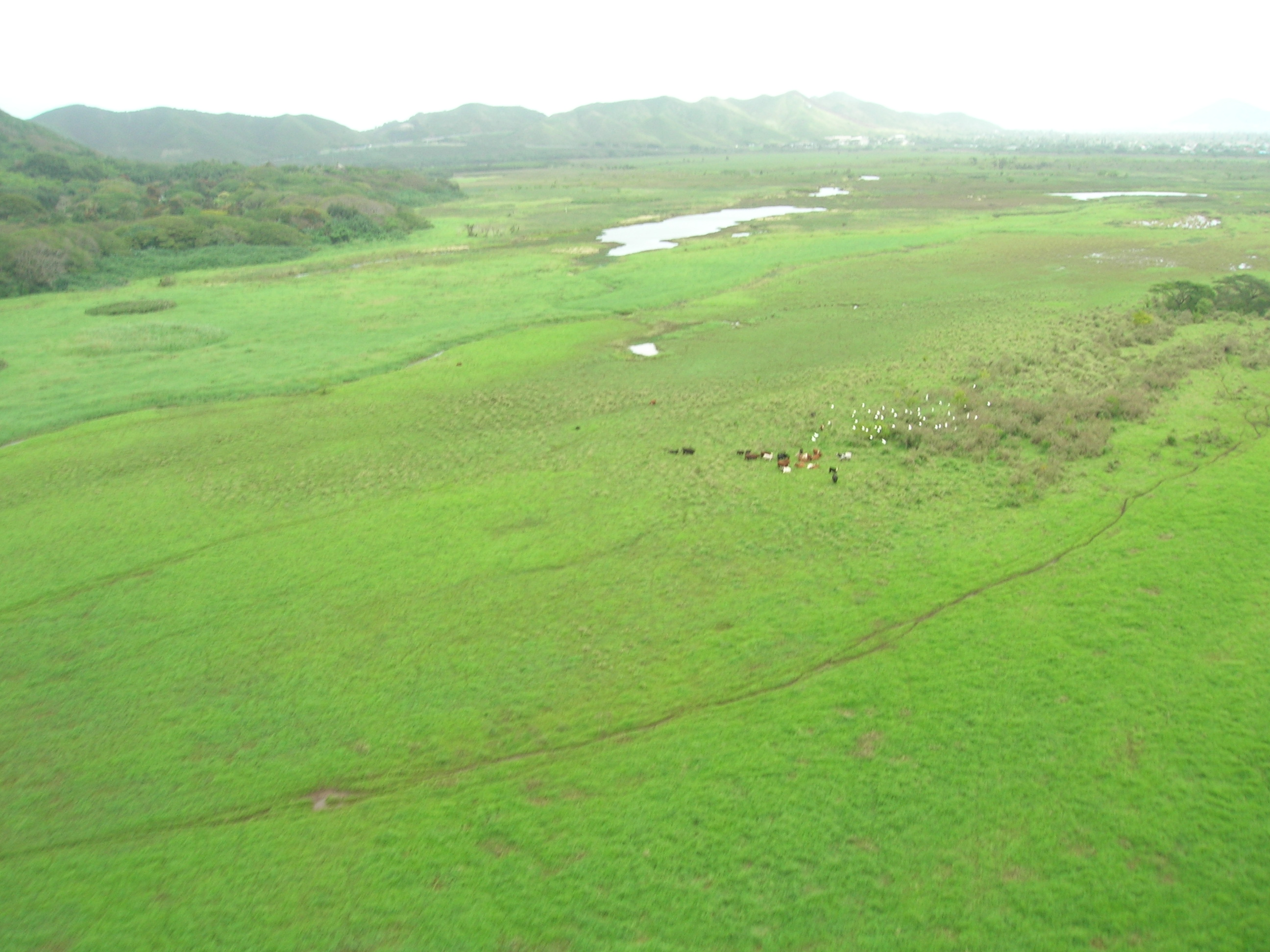
Oahu, Maʻilikūkahiʻs island; Maʻilikūkahi founded Oʻahuʻs new dynasty.

Maʻilikūkahi lived in the 15th or 16th century, but there is also possibility that he was born at the end of the 14th century.

He was born on Oʻahu as a son of the nobleman named Kukahiaililani (lani = "sky"). His mother was his fatherʻs spouse, a wife or a concubine of an unknown name. He was thus a paternal descendant of the High Chiefess Maelo of Kona district, Oʻahu.

Maʻilikūkahi succeeded his relative, Haka of Oʻahu, and subdivided the land into numerous ahupuaʻa. He had many rivals.

Maʻilikūkahiʻs son was Chief Kālonaiki of Oʻahu, his successor.

== See also ==
- Aliʻi nui of Oʻahu
- Māweke, Maʻilikūkahi's ancestor
