= Lakona of Oʻahu =

Hawaiian High Chief of the island of Oahu

Lakona, Chief of Oʻahu
- Born: Oahu, ancient Hawaii
- Spouse: Alaʻikauakoko
- Children: Kapae-a-Lakona
- Parent(s): Nawele of Oʻahu; Kalanimoeikawaikai

Lakona-a-Nawele (Hawaiian for: "Lakona, son of Nawele"; Hawaiian pronunciation: Lah-koh-nah) was an ancient Hawaiian High Chief of the island of Oahu. He was born c. 1340 on Oʻahu, Hawaii. He ruled over Oʻahu as one of the early monarchs of that island, and was a cousin of the Chief Laakona; both were the descendants of Maweke of Tahiti.

== Life ==
Lakona was born c. 1340 on Oʻahu, and he was a son of the High Chief Nawele of Oʻahu, whilst Lakonaʻs mother was called Kalanimoeikawaikai. Lakona was a grandson of Prince Kahokupohakano, son of Elepuʻukahonua.

After Naweleʻs death, Lakona became a monarch of Oʻahu.

=== Marriage ===
At some point in his life, Lakona had married a woman named Alaʻikauakoko, also known as Kanakoko, and their child was a son, Kapae-a-Lakona.

Lakona ruled together with his female cousin Maelo, and was succeeded by his son.
