= Mulielealiʻi =

Ancient Hawaiian High Chief

- Aliʻi Nui
- Issue: Moʻikeha; Kumuhonua
- Father: Maweke
- Mother: High Chiefess Naiolaukea

Mulielealiʻi (Hawaiian pronunciation: MUH-LEEH-EH-LEH-ALEEH), also known as Miʻi-i-ele-aliʻi, was an ancient Hawaiian High Chief who lived on the island of Oahu, and is mentioned in ancient chants and writings by Abraham Fornander. His title is Aliʻi Nui.

He was a son of wizard Maweke and his spouse Naiolaukea and was thus of Tahitian ancestry.

His famous brother was Chief Keaunui, a father of very High Chiefess Nuakea, Consort of Molokai.

Mother of Mulielealiʻiʻs niece Nuakea was Chiefess called Wehelani, who also married Mulielealiʻi, and bore him:

- High Chief Moʻikeha of Kauai
- High Chief Kumuhonua, "King" of Oahu
- High Chief ʻOlopana, who had two wives and went to Tahiti
- High Chiefess Hainakolo, wife to a man named Keanini
