= Kūaliʻi =

18th-century ali'i of O'ahu, Hawaii

- Aliʻi of Oʻahu
- Reign: 1700s
- Born: Kailua, Oʻahu
- Religion: Hawaiian religion

Chief Kūaliʻi was a Hawaiian aliʻi of Oʻahu, who reigned in the 1700s. He was from Kailua, and led wars against the chiefs of Waialua, Ewa, and Waianae. Kualii was the subject of a famous mele or chant of 600 lines, originally composed by two brothers, Kapaahulani and Kamaaulani, to gain favor with the chief. The chant was handed down orally over a 150-year period, and was collected by Judge Abraham Fornander. The chant was translated by Judge Lorrin Andrews and Curtis J. Lyons and recorded by historian Samuel M. Kamakau.

Some ancient historians claimed that he lived for 175 years.
