= Mualani =

Hawaiian High Chiefess

Mualani (also called Muolani or simply Mua; lani = "heaven/sky" in Hawaiian) was a Hawaiian High Chiefess who lived on the island of Oahu and was a Princess of Koʻolau.

She was a daughter of Princess Hinakaimauliʻawa of Koʻolau, who was Chief Kalehenui's daughter. Mualani's father was called Kahiwakaʻapu.

Princess Mualani was of Tahitian ancestry as a descendant of the kahu (priest) Maweke who came to Oahu from Tahiti.

After her mother's death, Chiefess Mualani succeeded her.

== Marriage ==
Although some chiefs had many consorts in ancient Hawaii, the only known consort of Mualani was a man named Kaomealani, whose parents remain unknown to us today because their names are not recorded in ancient chants. (He is also known as Kaʻomea or Kaomealani I.)

Mualani and her husband produced a son and a daughter. The son was called Kua-o-Mua ("Kua, son of Mua"), and he succeeded his mother, whilst marrying his sister Kapua-a-Mua. Their union was considered sacred and their child was Kawalewaleoku, a chief considered a deity in Koʻolau. (His rank was called niau piʻo.) His wife was called Unaʻula and their son was chief called Kaulaulaokalani, father of Chiefess Kaimihauoku.

Preceded by Hinakaimauliʻawa	Princess of Koʻolau	Succeeded by Kua-o-Mua
