= Māweke =

11th-century Hawaiian high chief

According to the Hawaiian chants, Chief Māweke was a chief of the highest known rank who lived in the 11th century. He is described in the legends as a wizard (or priest, kahuna in Hawaiian language) and an Aliʻi (a noble) of "the blue blood" (a Hawaiian nobleman of the highest rank). He was an ancestor of the royalty of the island of Oahu.

He was not of Hawaiian origin, but came to Hawaii from Tahiti and was famous for his knowledge of black magic. His famous ancestor was Nanaulu.

His parents are named in the chants as Kekupahaikala (father) and Maihikea (mother).

When he arrived to Oahu, Maweke erected a temple to the god called Kanaloa.

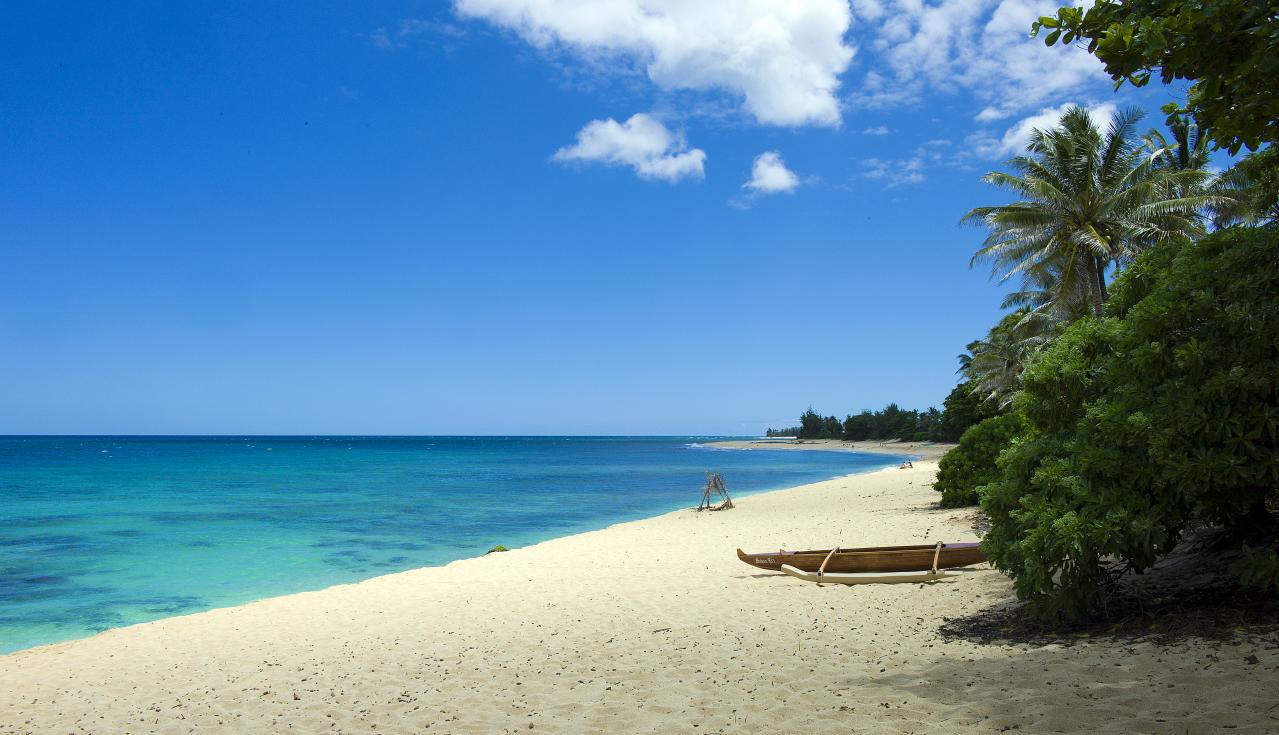
Oahu, a Hawaiian island on which Maweke arrived

Maweke married a woman named Naiolaukea (Naiolakea). They had children:

- Mulielealiʻi
- Kaehunui
- Kalehenui
- Keaunui, father of the High Chiefess Nuʻakea of Molokai
- Kamoeaulani
