= Kahaluʻu Bay =

Historic Place in Hawaii County, Hawaii

- Kahaluʻu Historic District
- U.S. National Register of Historic Places
- U.S. Historic district
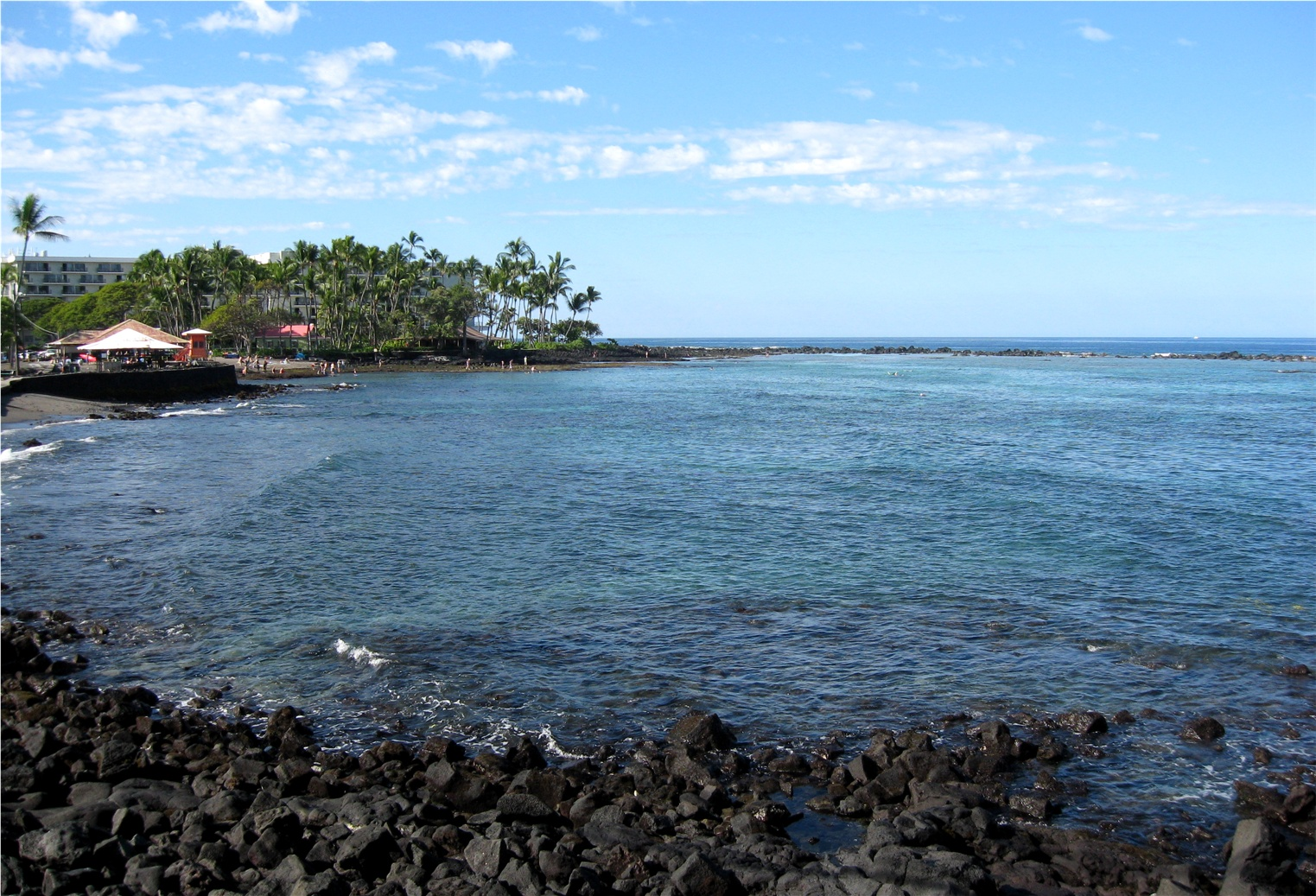
- Kahaluʻu Bay

- Location within Hawaii
- Location: Aliʻi Drive, Kahaluu-Keauhou, Hawaii
- Coordinates: 19°34′49″N 155°58′2.7″W
- Area: 700 acres (280 ha)
- Built: 1500-1749
- Architectural style: Ancient Hawaii
- NRHP reference No.: 74000713
- Added to NRHP: December 27, 1974

Kahaluʻu Bay (/ˌkɑːhəˈluːʔuː/; Hawaiian pronunciation: [ˈkɐhɐˈluʔu]) is a historic district and popular recreation area on the Kona coast of the Big Island of Hawaiʻi.

== Early history ==
This area has been populated for about 500 years, and in the 18th and 19th centuries was an important royal residence. One major feature is Pa o ka menehune (which means literally "wall of the ancients"), a breakwater constructed in Ancient Hawaii that might have once enclosed the entire bay. Since construction of a heiau using the dry-stack masonry technique (uhau humu pohaku) was a major undertaking, it is unusual to find the concentration of about ten that were built on this bay.

The Kuʻemanu Heiau is on the north end of the bay. This was used by royalty to view surfing and as a residence. Nearby the Keawaiki canoe landing site is popular today with local surfers.

Two ancient fishponds called Waikuaʻala and Poʻo Hawaiʻi are still visible. Royal Governor John Adams Kuakini had a thatched roof house, and King David Kalākaua built a beach house in this area which has been reconstructed. South of the bay is Hāpaialiʻi Heiau, associated with astrological observation, built between 1411 and 1465 and restored in 2007. The Keʻeku Heiau was used for human sacrifice (luakini) and Kapuanoni Heiau were also built just south of the bay. Petroglyphs thought to depict the defeat of Kamalalawalu of Maui by Lonoikamakahiki can be viewed at low tide near the temples. Several kuʻula (sacred stones, said to have been brought from Maui) were monuments to the plentiful fish and Green turtles that are still found in the bay.

== More recent history ==
Across Aliʻi Drive from the bay are the stone ruins of the original Helani Church built in 1861 by Rev. John D. Paris. It was built on the ruins of the ʻOhiʻamukumuku Heiau. As the population moved inland, a new Helani Church was constructed at a higher elevation still used by the congregation today.

On the grounds of a former Kahuna's house, a Catholic church officially called "Saint Peter's by the Sea" was built in 1880 on Laʻaloa bay, and then moved to its present location in 1912, run by the Saint Michael the Archangel Catholic Church Parish. It is commonly known as "the little blue church", and is used as a landmark for canoe races.

In 1970, the Keauhou Beach Hotel was built on the point South of the bay. The hotel was bought in 1987 for $13M by the Azabu Building Company, headed by Japanese businessman Kitaro Watanabe. Plans were to enlarge it and build a larger resort combined with the Kona Lagoon Hotel (built in 1975), and more facilities across the street, to be called the Azabu Kona Beach Resort. There was also a botanical park called Kona Gardens on the uphill (mauka) side of the street. However, the investors suffered financial problems in the 1990s. The other properties were abandoned, reverting to the holder of the lease in 1995, the investment arm of Kamehameha Schools, which eventually also bought the remaining hotel. In June 1996, three of the executives were arrested in Tokyo, suspected of concealing assets from creditors. In 1997, the hotel was sold again to Trinity Investments from Chicago. The 462-room Kona Lagoon Hotel, closed since 1988, had fallen into disrepair. Local people said the project was "cursed" because of all the sacred sites in the area, and it was torn down in 2004, with long-term plans to restore the historic sites. In 2012, Kamehameha Schools announced plans to close and eventually demolish the Keauhou Beach Hotel, and to build a cultural and educational complex on the site. The hotel closed in October 2012. As of August 2014, demolition is planned for fall 2015. Both hotels have been torn down and the site returned to natural condition.

The Kalahuu Bay District was added to the National Register of Historic Places on December 27, 1974.

== Recreation ==
The bay is still used today by surfers, with a surf school across the street from the ancient canoe landing. The area around the bay was added to the National Register of Historic Places in 1974 as historic district number 74000713 in 1974. The state registry lists it as site 10-37-4150. The south end of the bay became Kahaluʻu Beach County Park in 1953, a popular snorkeling spot, although the beach is rocky with some gray sand. The parking lot is open 7am - 7pm, and lifeguards are on duty during limited hours.

The Kohala Center sponsors a program called ReefTeach to educate visitors about the preservation of the bay, and has produced some educational videos on the history of the area. An educational festival called the Ocean Fair is held here as part of the Kona Earth Festival, associated with Earth Day. The hotel is now called the Outrigger Keauhou Beach Resort.The hotels have both been torn down. Two more Heiaus on this point are being reconstructed. Directly south of this point is another historic area, Keauhou Bay.

== Gallery ==
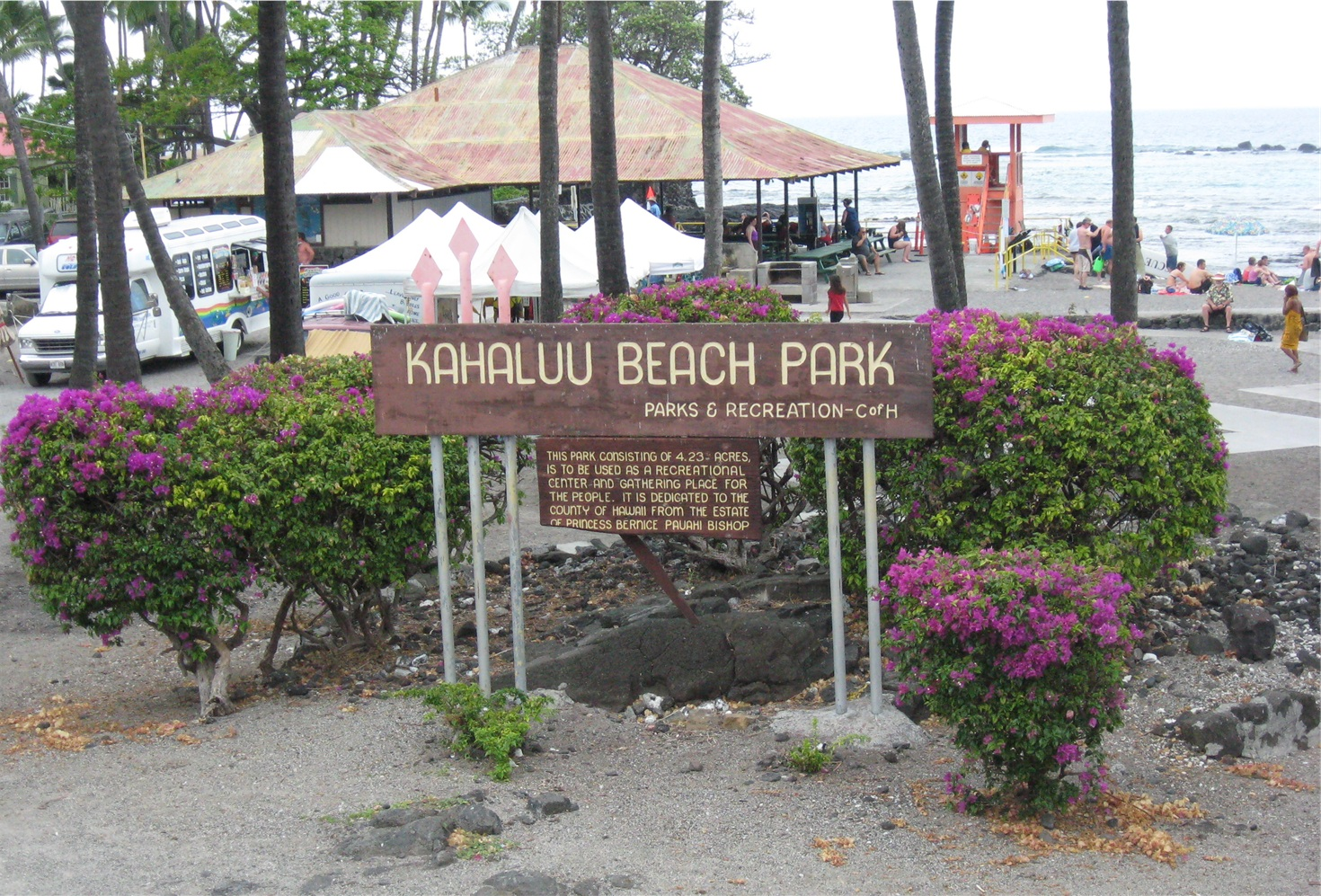
The County Park is a popular snorkeling spot

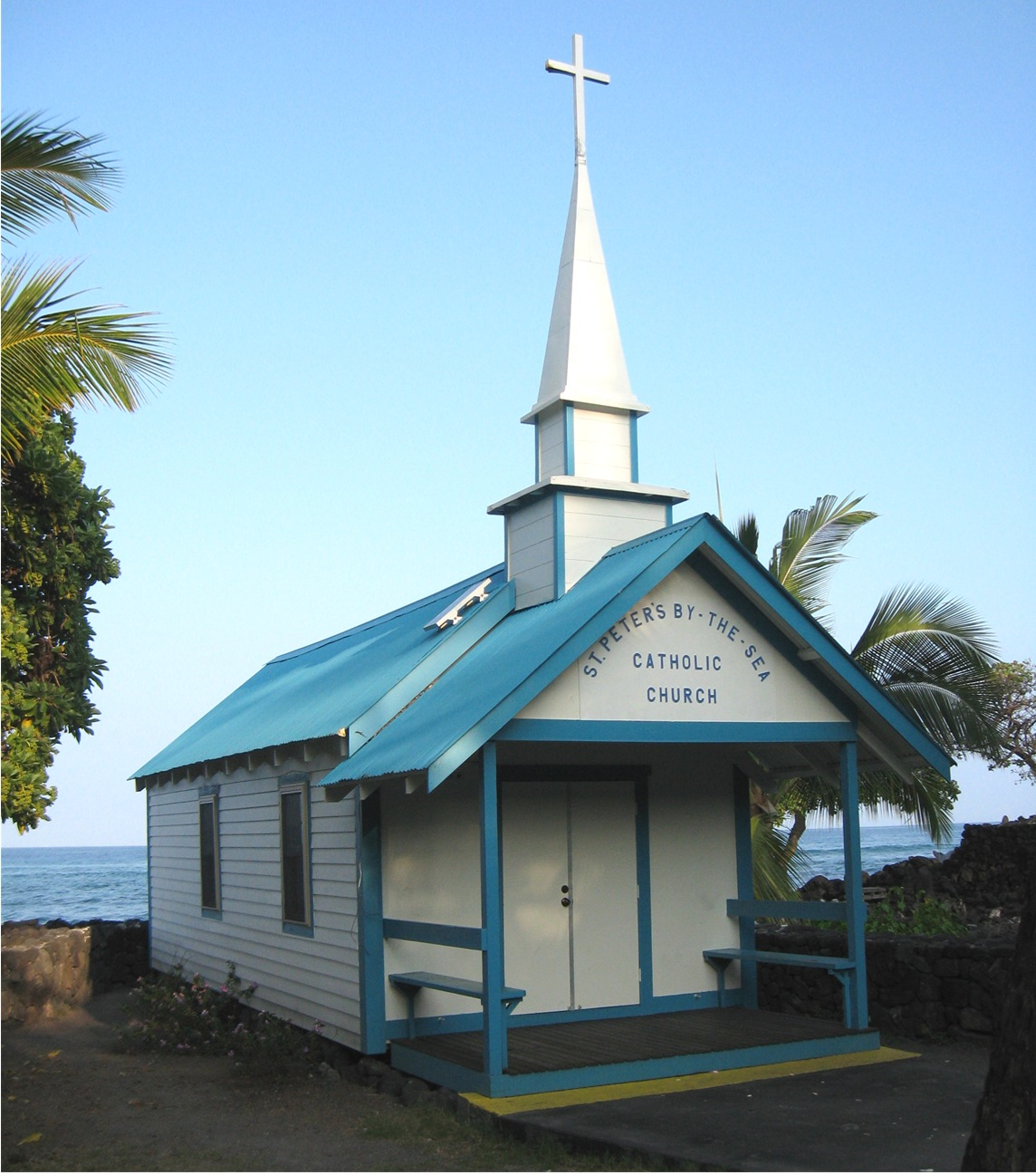
St. Peter by the Sea Catholic Church

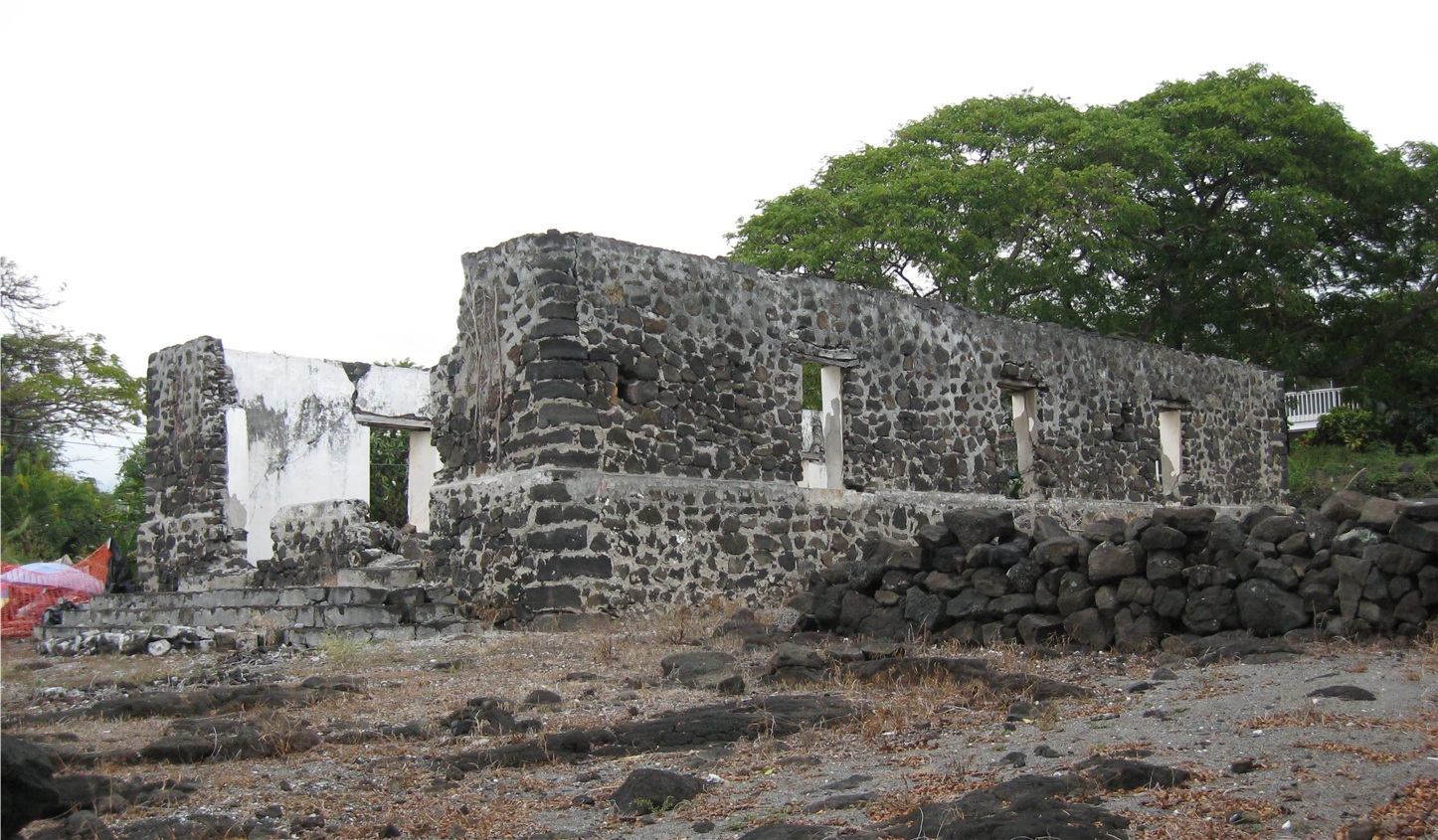
Ruins of 1860 Helani Church

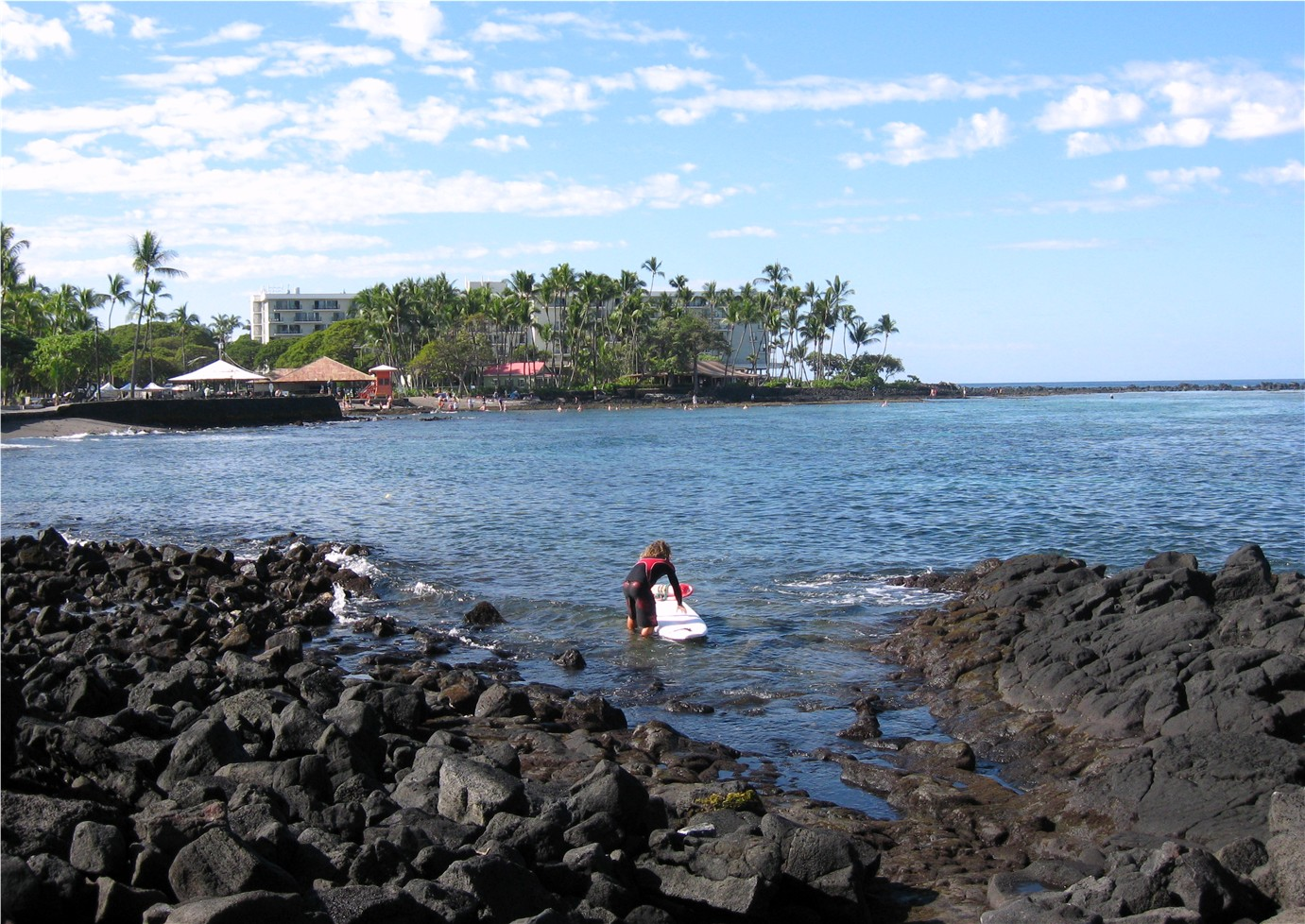
Ancient canoe landing still used by surfers

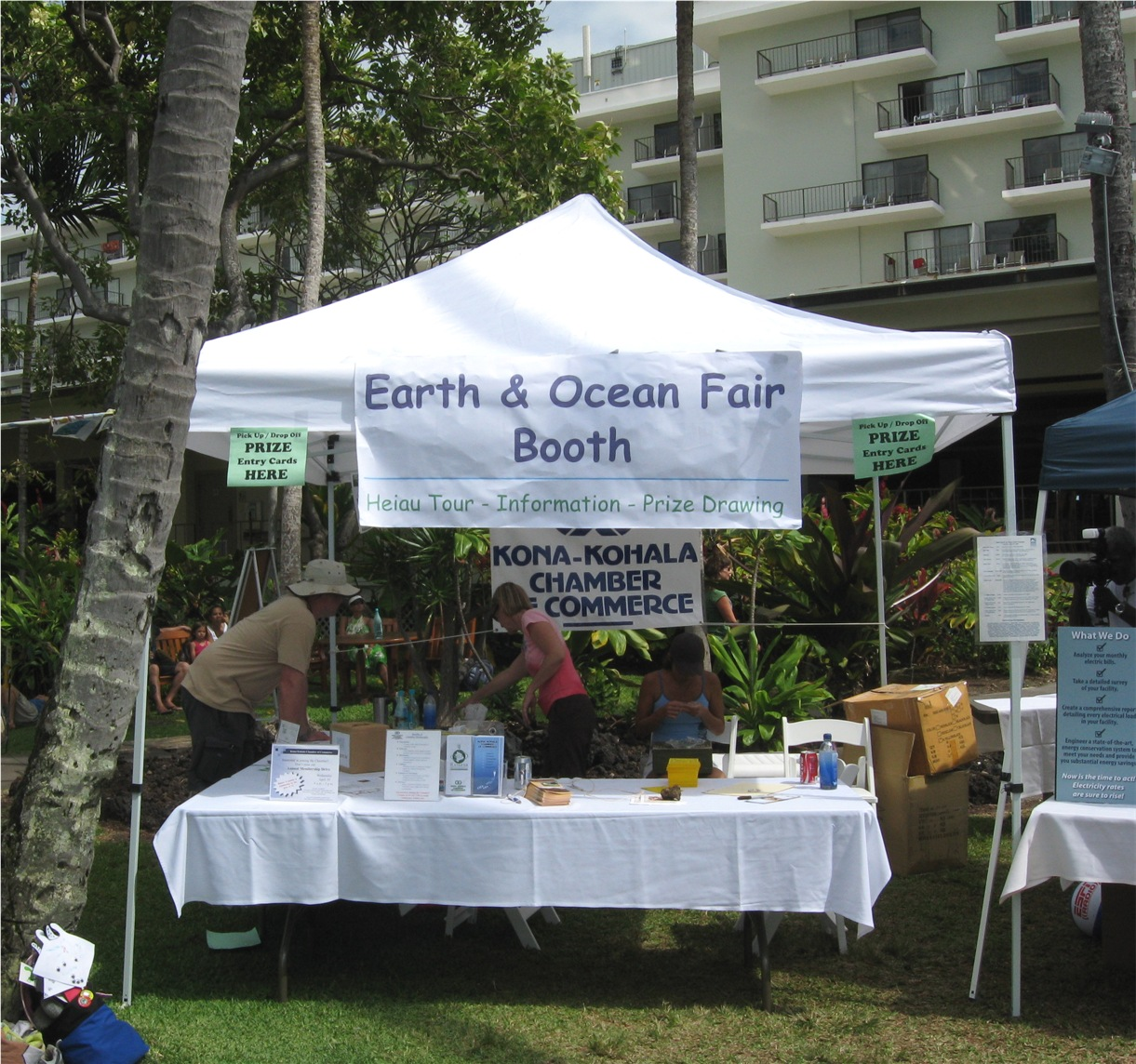
Kona Earth Festival Ocean Fair 2009

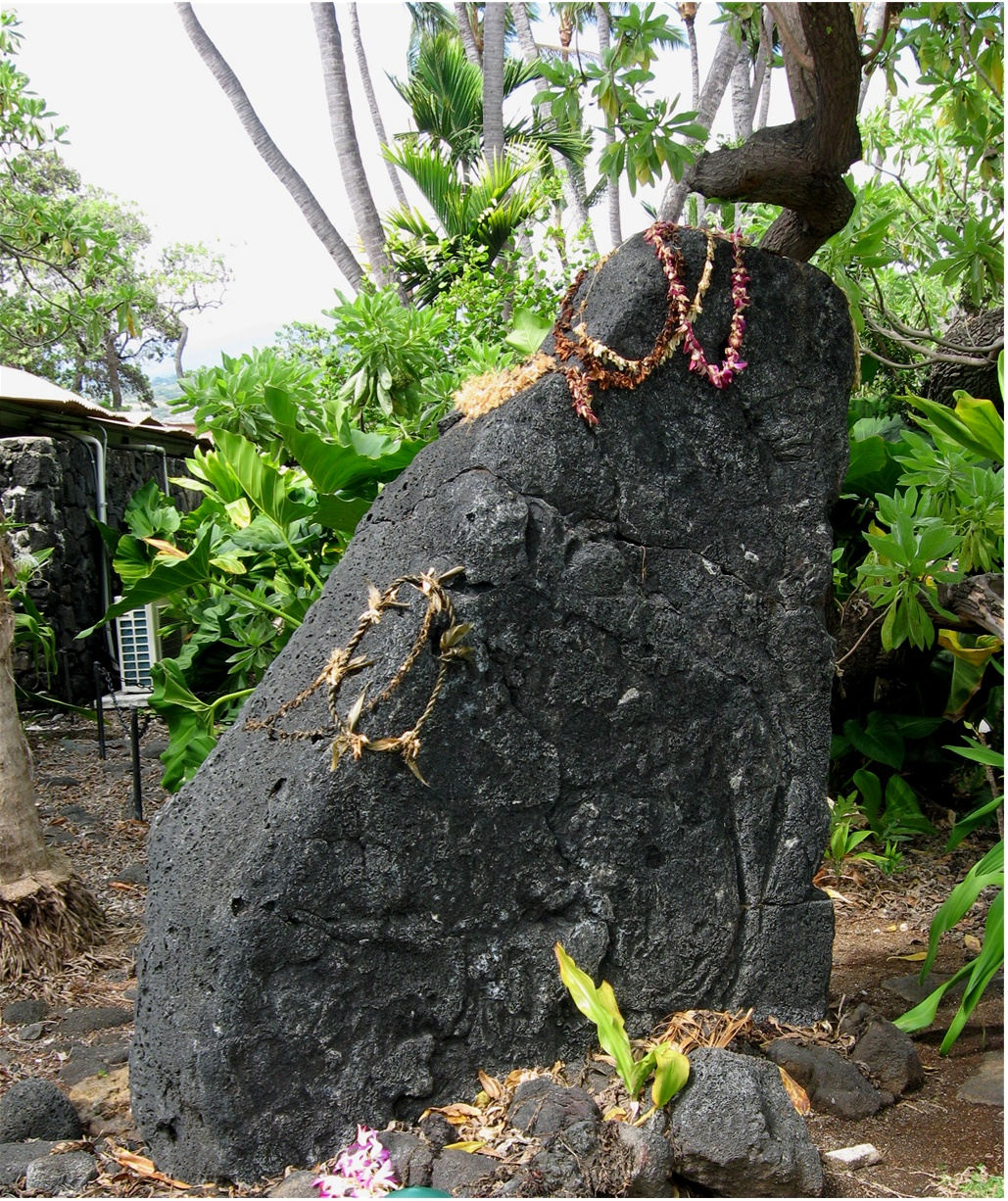
Kuʻula stones were monuments to the plentiful fish

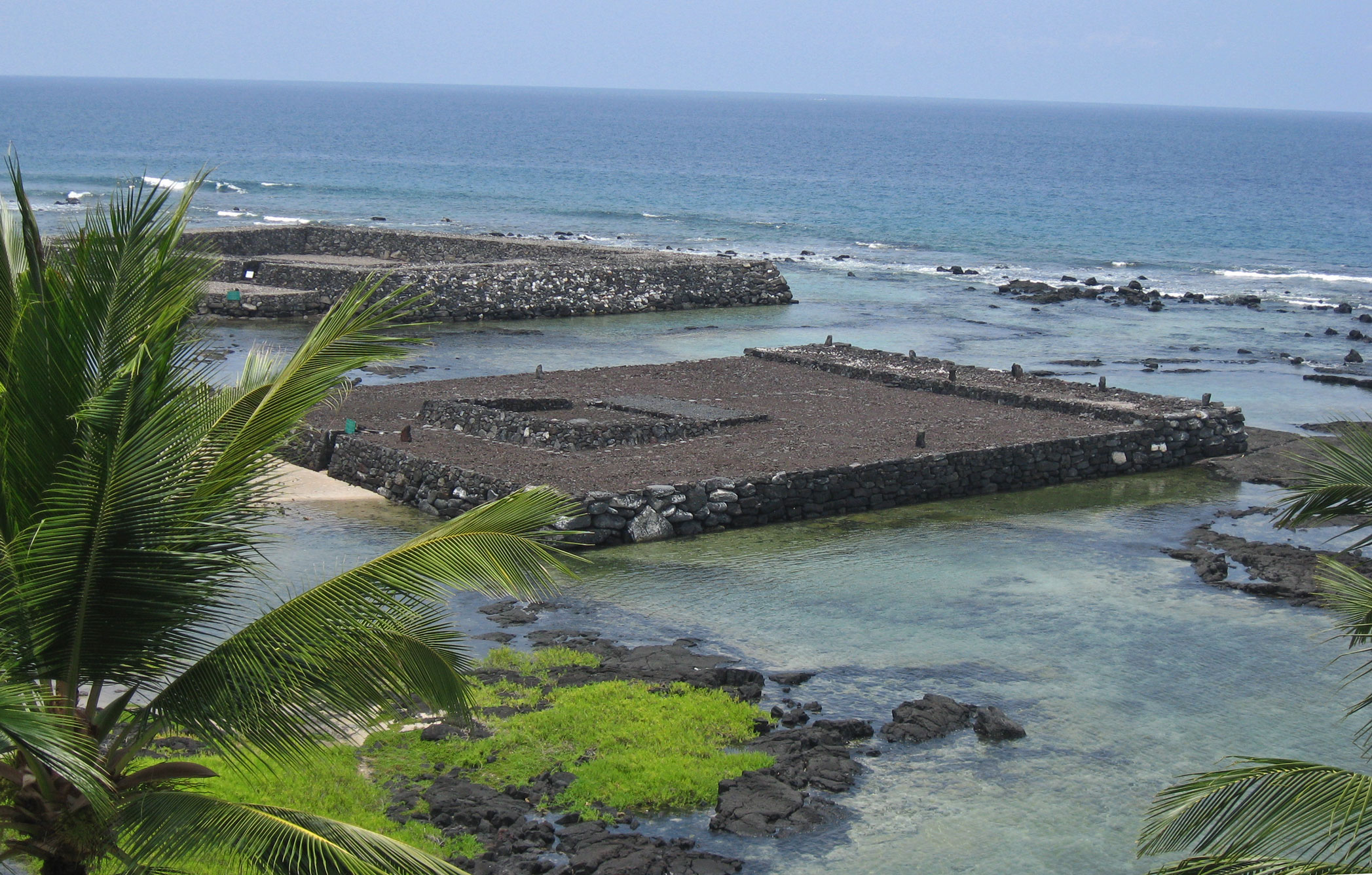
Hāpaialiʻi Heiau was restored in 2007

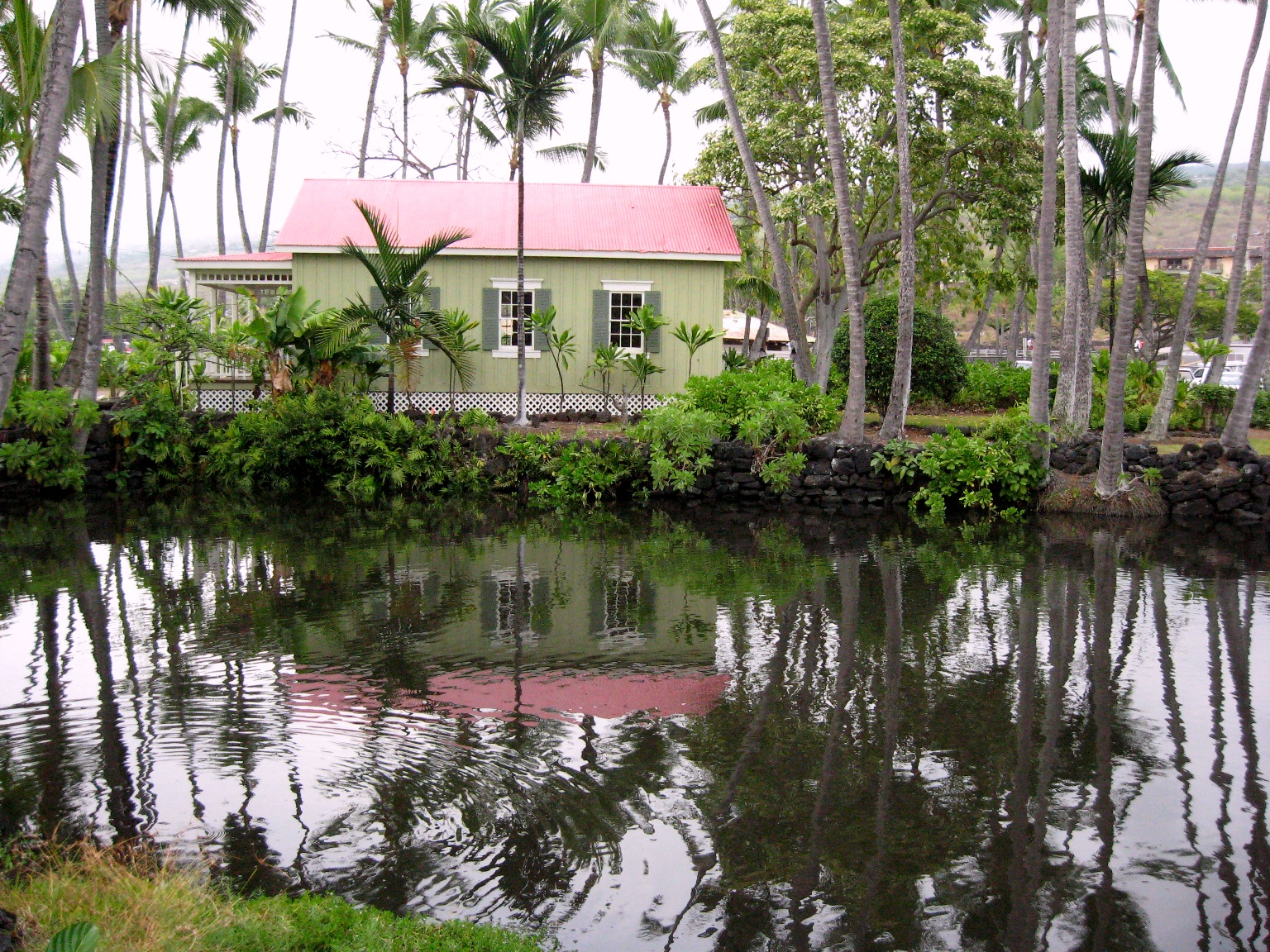
Reconstructed King Kalākaua beach house on Poʻo Hawaiʻi

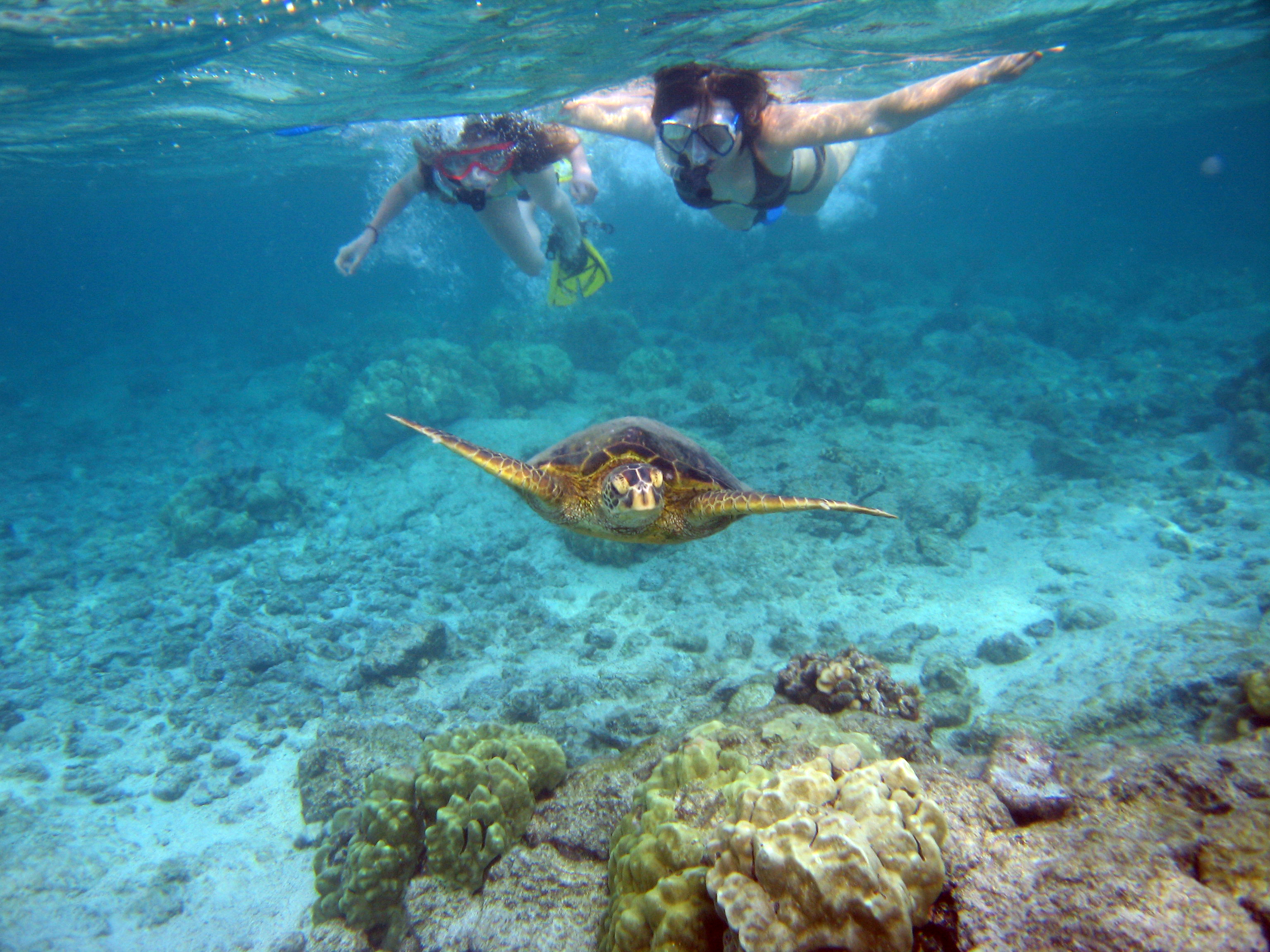
Two snorkelers swimming with a Green sea turtle in Kahaluu Beach Park
