= Laʻaloa Bay =

Bay in Hawaii County, Hawaii

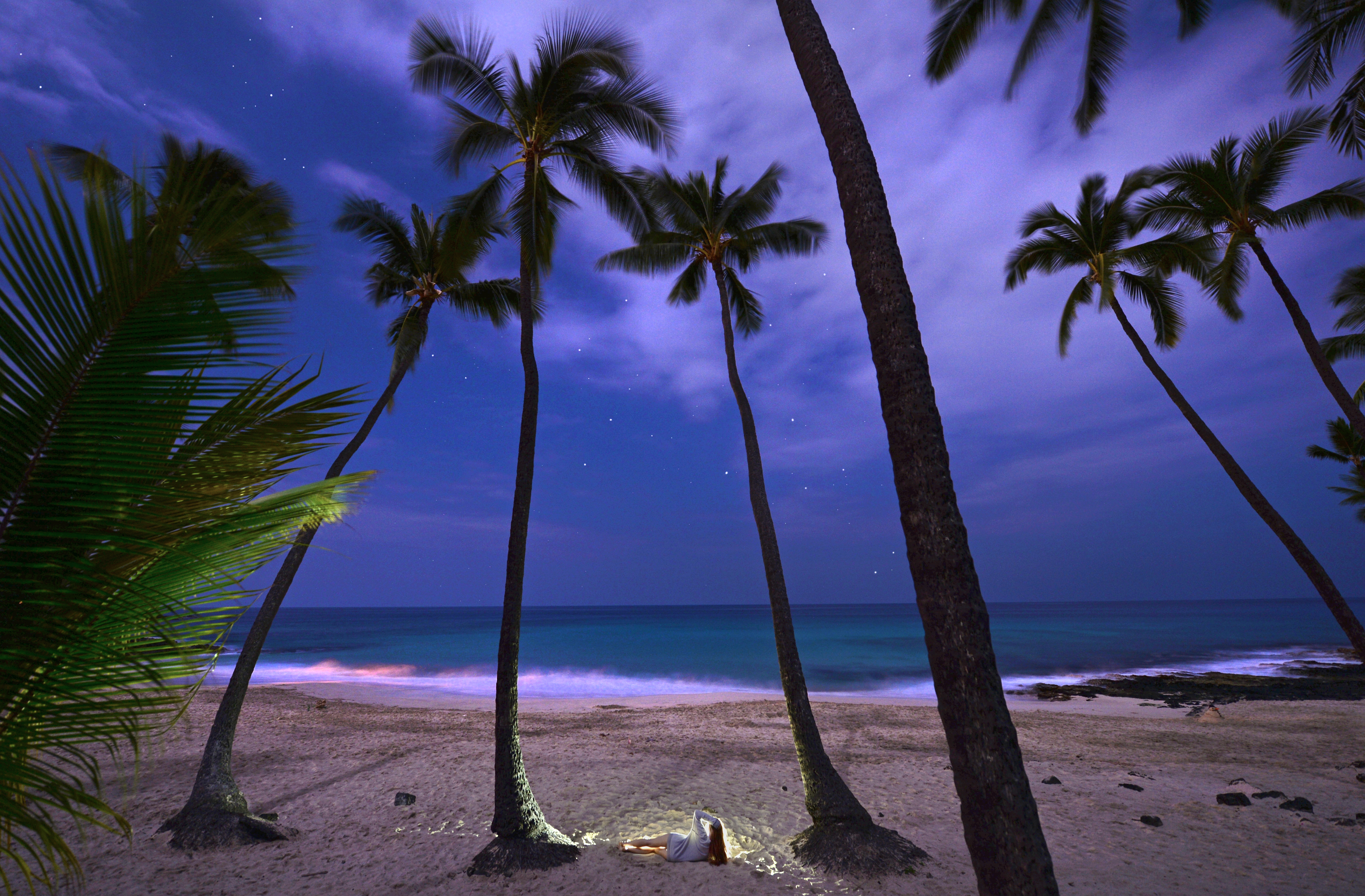
La'aloa Bay, also known as Magic Sands Beach, on Christmas night, 2015

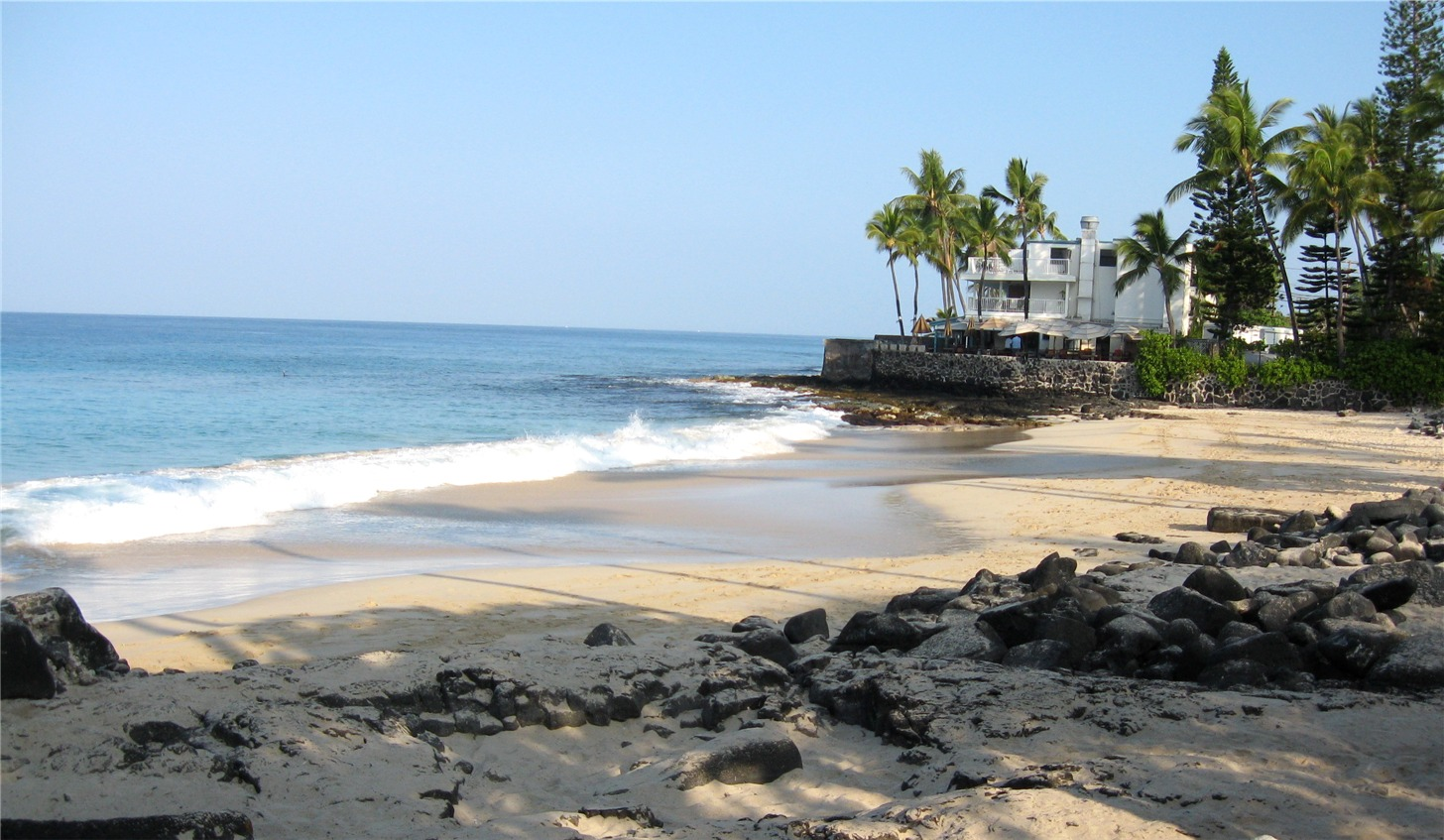
La'aloa Bay on a very calm day

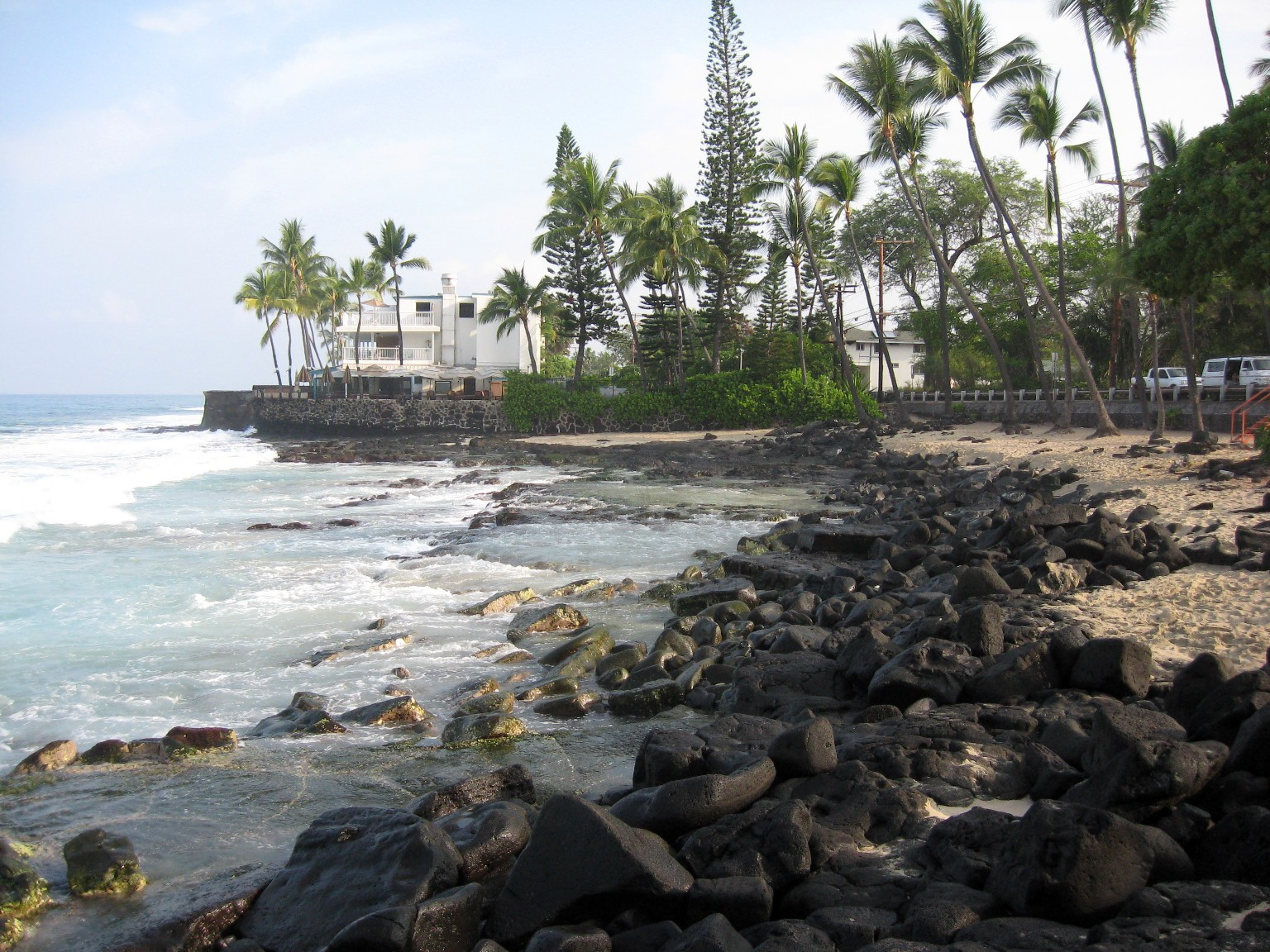
After a storm the sand all washes out, exposing lava rocks

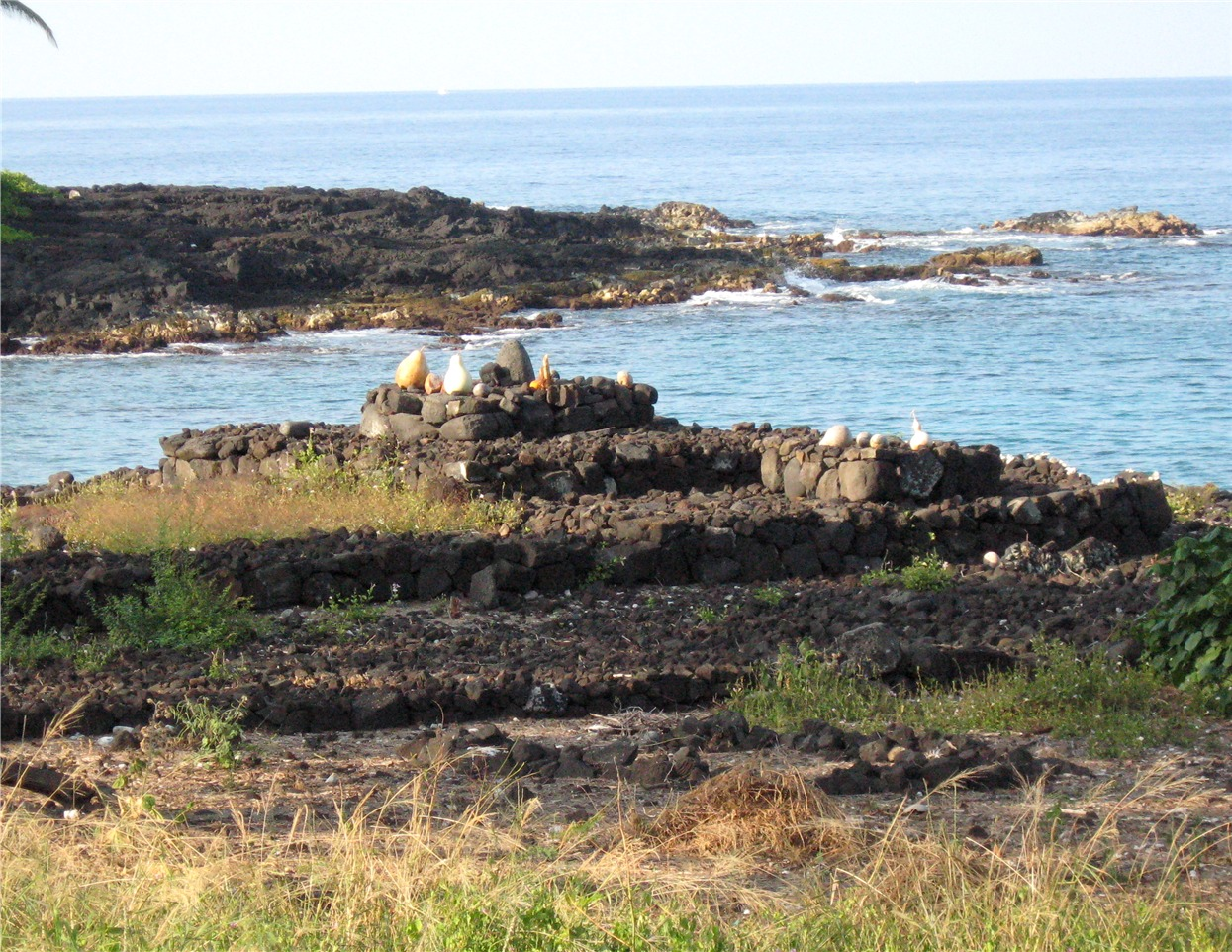
Ruins of an old temple, with scuba diving cove in the background

Laʻaloa Bay is a popular recreation area in Kailua-Kona, on the Big Island of Hawaiʻi.

Also known as "Magic Sands" or "White Sands Beach", the official name is "Laʻaloa Beach County Park". During calm weather, it is one of the only fine white sandy beaches in the Kailua-Kona area. It is also sometimes called "Disappearing Sands", since the sand is washed out in a storm several times a year. A strong surf break on the shore can be dangerous, but makes it a favorite for bodyboarding by experienced locals, even under moderate surf conditions. Just north of the beach is Pahoehoe Beach County Park. Although the shoreline here is rocky lava with a few coral pebbles, there are picnic tables, restrooms, and running water.

In the Hawaiian language, la'a loa means "very sacred". Several Archaeological sites are in the area. The ruins of haukalua Heiau (an Ancient Hawaiian temple) are on a point just south of the beach, at the parking lot which was added in 2000. The stone structure was cleared and restored and a small ceremonial platform (lele) constructed by descendants of the people who lived in this area for hundreds of years. A small rocky cove south of the point is popular for scuba diving in calm conditions.

== History ==
In 1994 after the County of Hawaii announced plans to build an 80 stall parking lot, Hawaiian Kupuna (elders) helped form a group known as the La’aloa Ohana (family). This led to agreements being made to create a Hawaiian Cultural/Educational center in 1995. In June 1995 more than 13 members of the La’aloa Ohana were arrested for attempted camping, even though according to police reports a majority of ohana had left the park, prior to its closing. The ohana continued to advocate for complete Preservation Planning and in 1997 a detailed Community based Preservation Plan was completed. The effect of this Plan was that only 25 parking stalls could be developed. While the County of Hawaii said in the 1997 Environmental Impact Statement that they would install protective measures for the Historic site prior to any construction, in 2000 they built the parking lot, and as of 2014 the Protective measures have yet to be completed.

In August 2014, based on the continued advocacy by La’aloa Ohana members, the State of Hawaii Historic Preservation Division, supported by the Department of Land and Natural Resources Conservation Investigators, forwarded to the Mayor of the County of Hawaii a scathing letter and demand they implement all of the Protective measures, or potentially they could face millions of dollars in fines. In December 2014 the County of Hawaii is currently starting to implement the Preservation Plan. Unfortunately many of the historic sites have now been severely damaged.

Based on the ongoing and tireless efforts of members of the La'aloa Ohana, on May 10, 2017 the County of Hawaii announced it would be closing the parking lot at La'aloa Beach Park on May 17, 2017, indefinitely, due to the ongoing desecration caused by the parking lot.

== Location ==
It is located on Aliʻi Drive in the Kona District at coordinates 19°35′38″N 155°58′17″W. About a mile to the north is Holualoa Bay, and a mile to the south is Kahaluʻu Bay.
