= Kalaniʻōpuʻu =

Hawaiian monarch (d. 1782)

Kalaniʻōpuʻu-a-Kaiamamao
- Aliʻi Nui of Kaʻū; Aliʻi Aimoku of Hawaiʻi
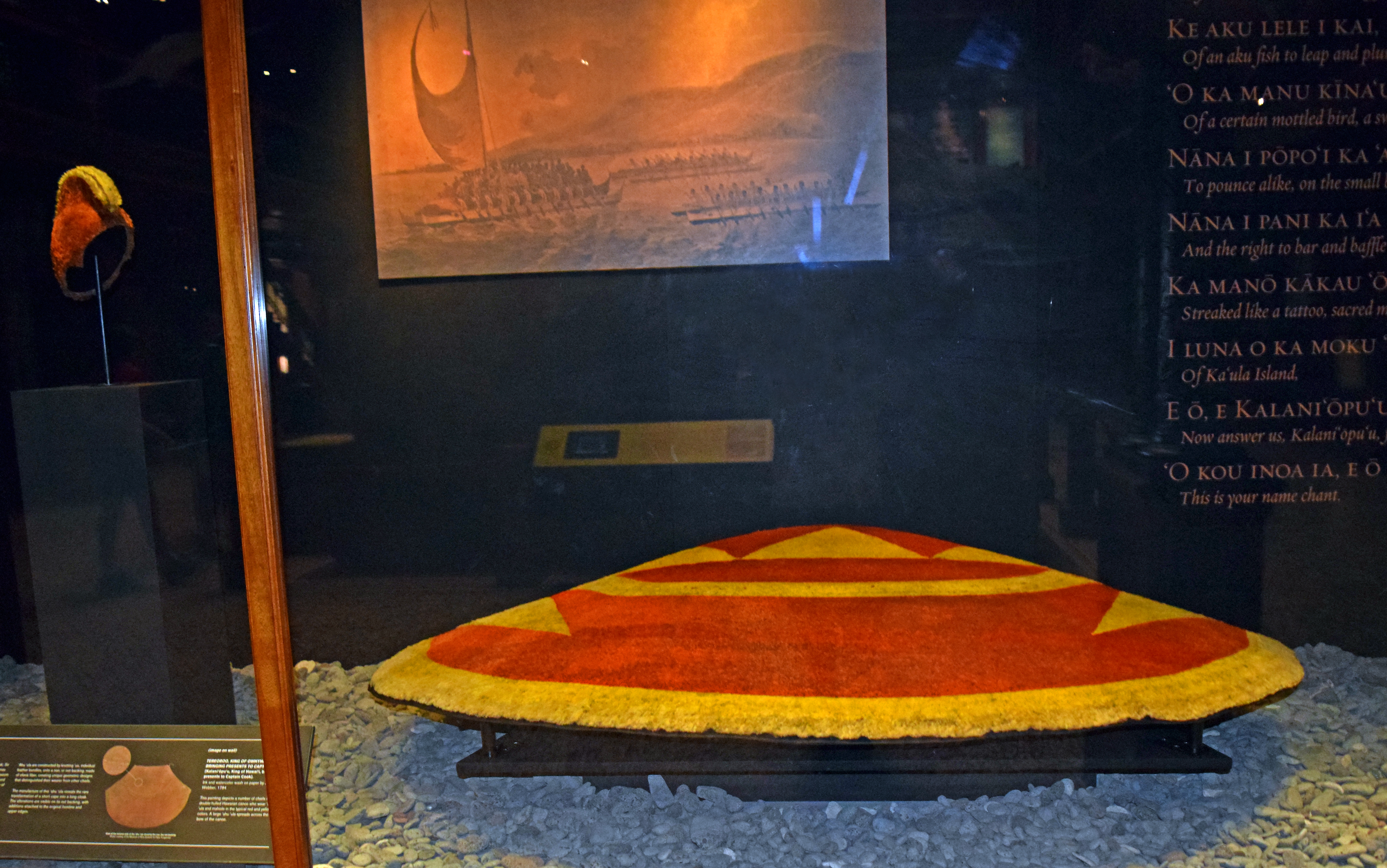
- The original ʻahu ʻula and mahiole of Kalaniʻōpuʻu that was given to Captain James Cook as a gift in 1779 and now on display at the Bishop Museum in Honolulu Hawaii
- Born: c. 1729
- Died: April 1782 (aged 52–53); Kāʻilikiʻi, WaioʻahukiniKaʻū
- Spouse: Kalola Pupuka-o-Honokawailani; Kalaiwahineuli; Kamakolunuiokalani; Mulehu; Kānekapōlei; Kekupuohi
- Issue: Kīwalaʻō; Kalaipaihala; Pualinui; Keōua Kuahuʻula; Keōua Peʻeale; Kaoiwikapuokalani
- House: House of Keawe
- Father: Kalaninuiamamao
- Mother: Kamakaimoku

Kalaniʻōpuʻu-a-Kaiamamao (c. 1729 – April 1782) was the aliʻi nui (supreme monarch) of the island of Hawaiʻi. He was called Terreeoboo, King of Owhyhee by James Cook and other Europeans. His name has also been written as Kaleiopuu. (Note: Cook's Journal, March 1779: "Terreeoboo, the present king of Owhyhee, had a son named Teewarro, by Rora-rora.." Webber's engraving (Journals, pub. 1784. Pl. 61) is captioned using the "Tereoboo" spelling, as shown Webber's engraving, below.)

== Biography ==
Kalaniʻōpuʻu was the son of Kalaninuiamamao and his wife Kamakaʻīmoku, a high ranking aliʻi wahine (female of hereditary nobility). She had another son, Keōua, with another husband named Kalanikeʻeaumoku. This made her the grandmother of Kamehameha I. During his reign, Alapainui had kept the two young princes, Kalaniʻōpuʻu and Keōua, close to him out of either kindness or for political reasons.

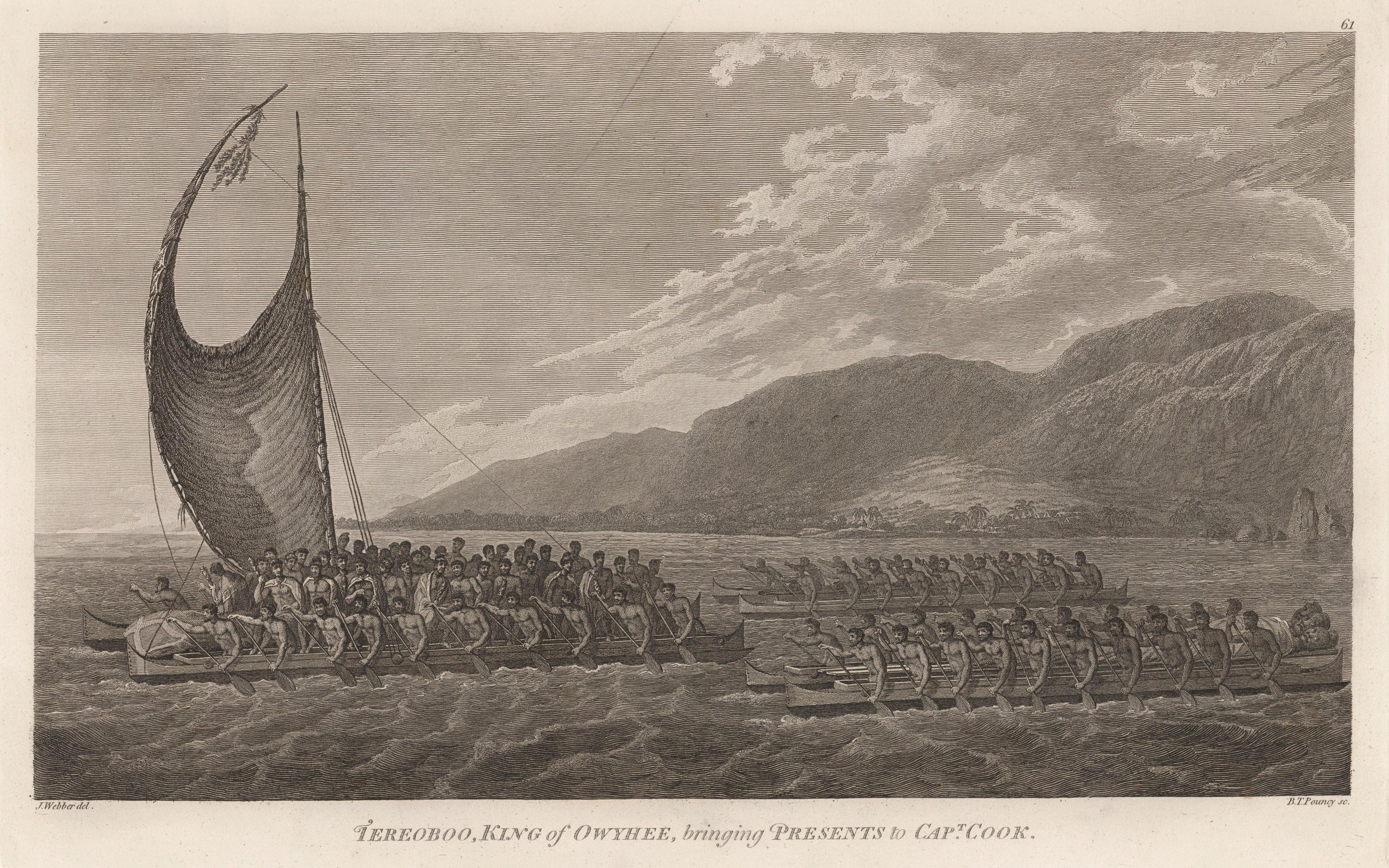
Tereoboo (Kalaniʻōpuʻu) and men on canoe, bearing gifts —Engraving by John Webber (pub. 1784)

Kalaniʻōpuʻu-a-Kaiamamao was the king of the island when Captain James Cook came to Hawaiʻi, and the king went aboard Cook's ship on November 26, 1778. After Cook anchored at Kealakekua Bay in January 1779, Kalaniʻōpuʻu-a-Kaiamamao paid a ceremonial visit on January 26, 1779, and exchanged gifts including a ʻahuʻula (feathered cloak) (Note: Cook's Journal, January 1779: "..the king rose up, and.. threw over the Captain's shoulders the cloak he himself wore..") and mahiole (ceremonial helmet), since it was during the Makahiki season. Cook's ships returned on February 11 to repair storm damage. This time relations were not as good, resulting in a violent struggle when Cook tried to take Kalaniʻōpuʻu hostage after the theft of a longboat, which led to Cook's death.

Kalaniʻōpuʻu-a-Kaiamamao died at Kāʻilikiʻi, Waioʻahukini, Kaʻū, in April 1782. He was succeeded by his son, Kīwalaʻō, as king of Hawaiʻi island, and his nephew, Kamehameha I, who was given guardianship of Kū-ka-ili-moku, the god of war. His nephew would eventually overthrow his son at the battle of Mokuʻōhai. The island of Hawaiʻi was then effectively divided into three parts: his nephew Kamehameha ruled the western districts, his younger son Keōua Kuahuula controlled Kaʻū, and his brother Keawemauhili controlled Hilo.

Kalaniʻōpuʻu, Kamehameha, Kānekapōlei and Peleuli family tree

Family tree based on Abraham Fornander's "An Account of the Polynesian Race" and other works from the author, Queen Liliuokalani's "Hawaii's Story by Hawaii's Queen", Samuel Mānaiakalani Kamakau's "Ruling Chiefs of Hawaii" and other works by the author, John Papa ʻĪʻī's "Fragments of Hawaiian History", Edith Kawelohea McKinzie's "Hawaiian Genealogies: Extracted from Hawaiian Language Newspapers, Vol. I & II", Kanalu G. Terry Young's "Rethinking the Native Hawaiian Past", Charles Ahlo, Jerry Walker, and Rubellite Kawena Johnson's "Kamehameha's Children Today", The Hawaiian Historical Society Reports, the genealogies of the Hawaiian Royal families in Kingdom of Hawaii probate, the works of Sheldon Dibble and David Malo as well as the Hawaii State Archive genealogy books.

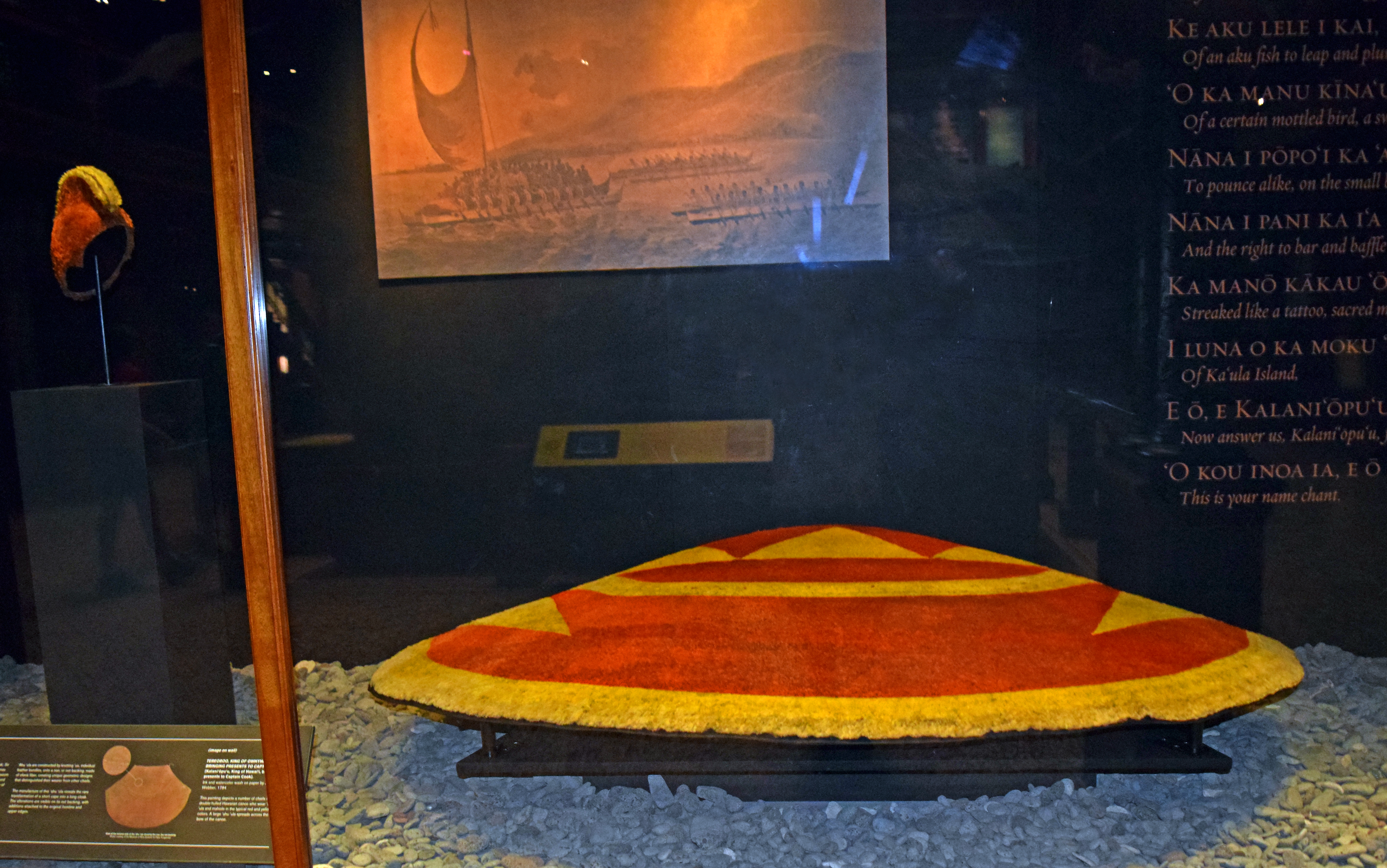
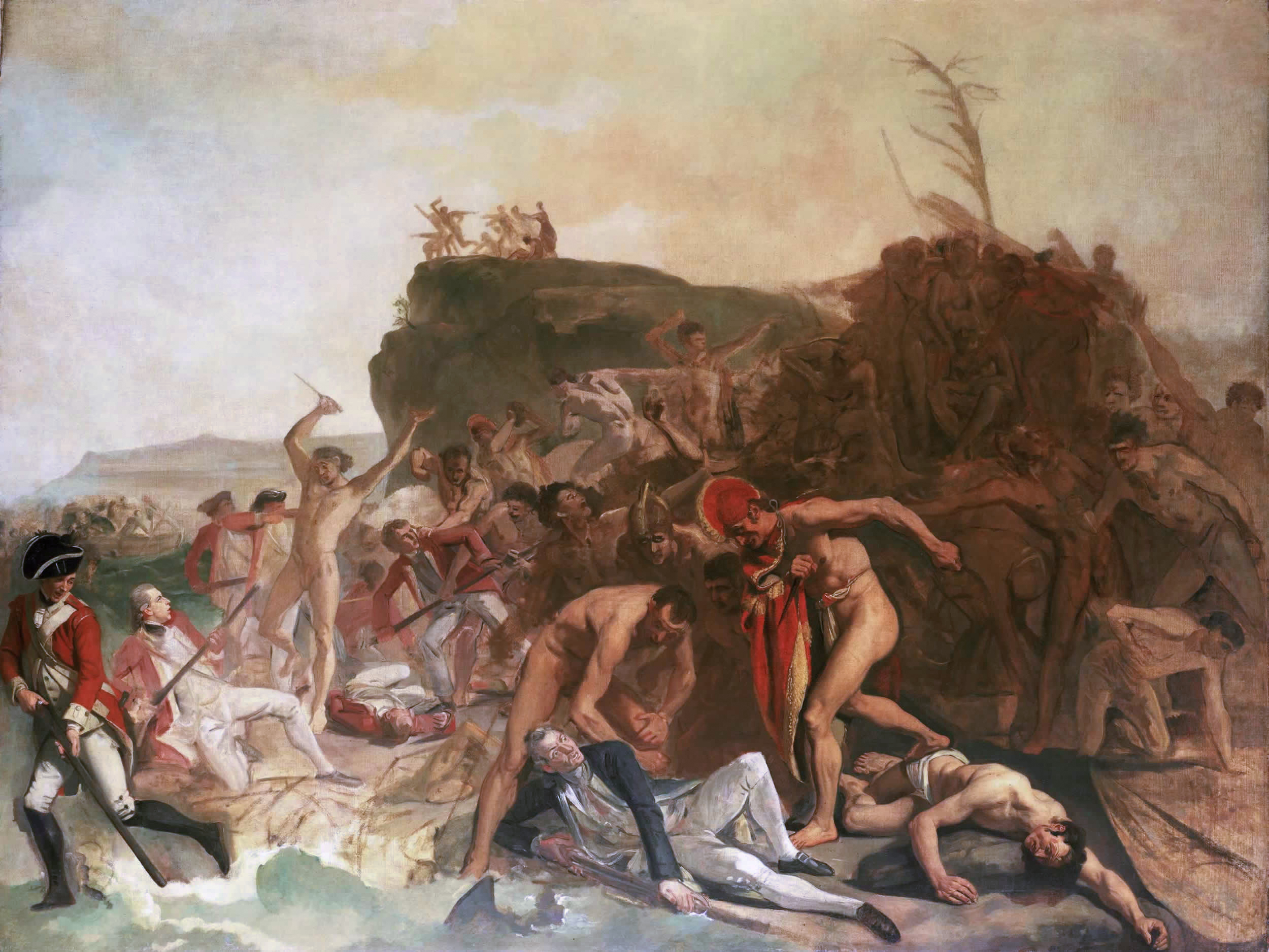
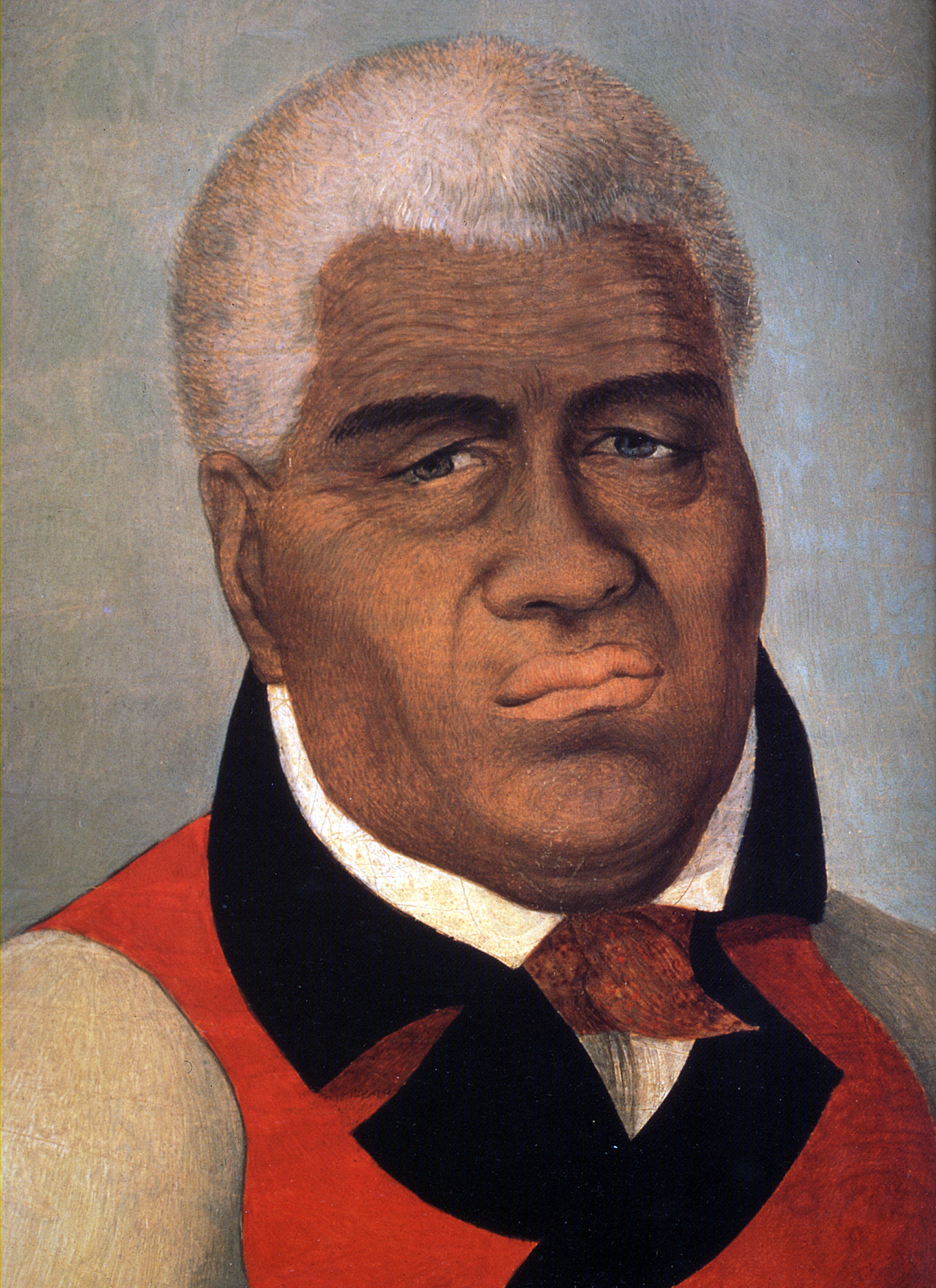
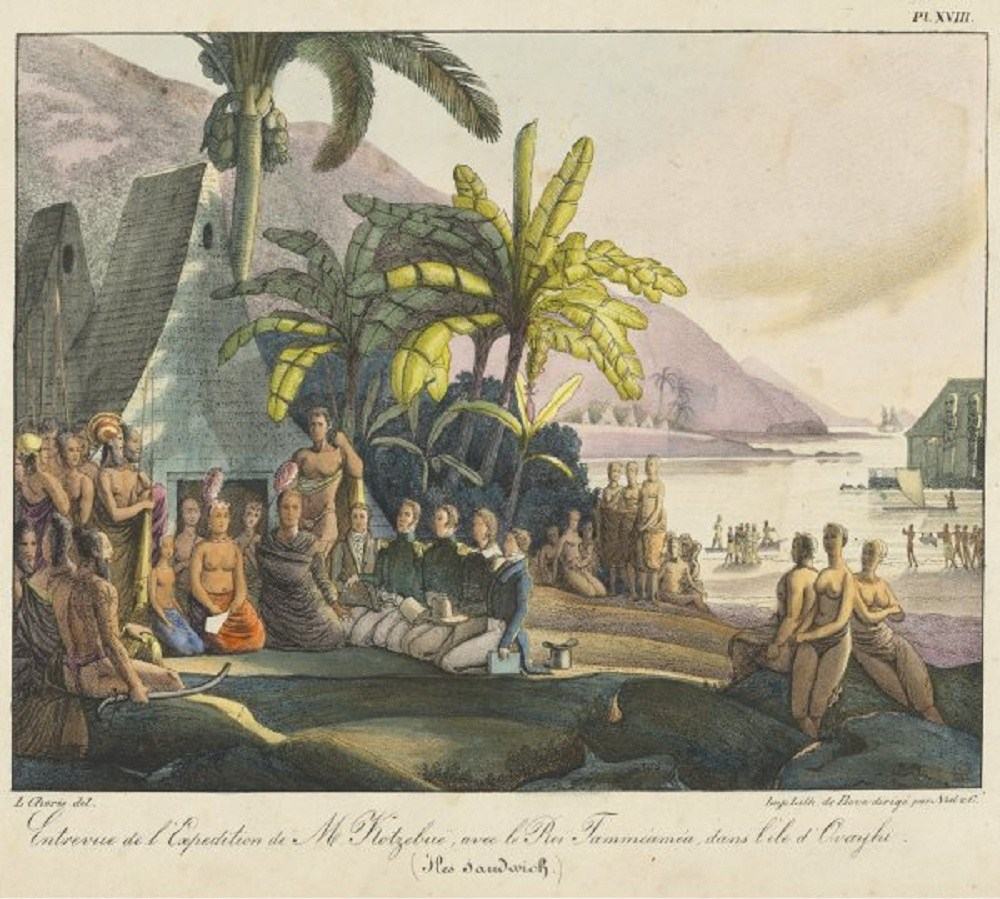
Pinea (w) | Liloa (k) (Note: "The mother of Umi was named Akahiakuleana, and though in humble life, she was a lineal descendant in the sixth generation from Kalahari, moku, the son of Kanipahu, with Hualani of the Nanaulu-Maweke line, and half-brother to Kalapana, the direct ancestor of Liloa. When parting from Akahiakuleana, Liloa gave her the ivory clasp (Palaoa) of his necklace, his feather wreath (Lei-hulu), and his Malo or waist-cloth, and told her that when the child was grown up, if it was a boy, to send him with these tokens to Waipio, and he would acknowledge him. The boy grew up with his mother and her husband, a fine, hearty, well-developed lad, foremost in all sports and athletic games of the time, but too idle and lazy in works of husbandry to suit his plodding stepfather. When Umi was nearly a full-grown young man, his stepfather once threatened to strike him as punishment for his continued idleness, when the mother averted the blow and told her husband, "Do not strike him; he is not your son; he is your chief;" and she then revealed the secret of his birth, and produced from their hiding-place the keepsakes which Liloa had left with her.") | Akahiakuleana (w) | Laielohelohe (w) (Note: Fornander-1880-p.87 "Piilani's children with Laielohelohe were Lono-a-Pii, who succeeded him as Moi of Maui; Kiha-a-Piilani, who was brought up to the age of manhood among his mother's relatives on Oahu; the daughter Piikea, just referred to; and another daughter, Kalaaiheana, of whom no further mention occurs. With another wife, named Moku-aHualeiakea, a Hawaii chiefess of the Ehu family, he had a daughter, Kauhiiliula-a-Piilani, who married Laninui-akaihupee, chief of Koolau, Oahu, and lineal descendant of Maweke through his son Kalehenui. And with still another wife, named Kunuunui-a-kapokii, whose pedigree has not been preserved, he had a son, Nihokela, whose eighth descendant was Kauwa, grandmother of the late King Lunalio on his father's side".) | Piʻilani (k)
Hakau (k) | Kapukinialiloa (w) (Note: Fornander-1880-p.103 "In the domestic relations of Umi, though blessed with a number of wives..." "He is known to have had at least six wives, viz.—(1.) Kulamea, whose family and descent are not reported, and who was the mother of Napunanahunui-a- Umi, a daughter; (2.) Makaalua, whose family has not been remembered, and who was the mother of Nohowaa-a-Umi, a daughter; (3.) Kapukini, a halfsister of Umi, and daughter of Liloa with Pinea, and who was the mother of Kealiiokaloa, a son, Kapulani or Kapukini, a daughter, and Keawenui-a- Umi, a son; (4.) Piikea, the daughter of Piilani, the Moi of Maui, and who was the mother of Aihakoko, a daughter, and Kumalae, a son; (5.) Mokuahualeiakea, descended from the great Ehu family in Kona, and who previously is said to have been the wife of Piilani of Maui. She was the mother of Akahiilikapu, a daughter. (6.) Henahena, said to be descended from Kahoukapu of Hawaii. She was the mother of Kamolanui-a-Umi, a daughter. There is one legend which mentions a seventh wife, named Haua, but her descent and her children are unknown, and her name is not mentioned on any of the genealogies that I possess. Of these eight children of Umi, Kealiiokaloa first, and Keawenui-a-Umi afterwards, succeeded their father as sovereigns of Hawaii".) | ʻUmi-a-Līloa (k) (Note: Fornander-1880-p.228 "There is not a commoner of Hawaii who would say that Umi-a-Liloa was not an ancestor of his, and a man who declines to acknowledge it does so for lack of information. Kapukini-a-Liloa was a royal consort of Umi-a-Liloa, and by whom Umi begat Keliiokaloa, a male, Kapulani, a female, and Keawenuiaumi, a male child. Piikea was a princess, being the daughter of Piilani, king of Maui, with Queen Laieloheloheikawai, and they (Piikea and Umi-a-Liloa) begat two male children, Kumalaenuiaumi and Aihakoko. Moku-a-Hualeiakea was also a princess among the grandchildren of Ehunuikaimalino of Kona, and she had a daughter, Akahiilikapu, by Umi-a-Liloa. He also had Ohenahenalani as wife and begat Kamolanuiaumi, and with the first children by the common women made Umi-a-Liloa the father of many children.") | Piʻikea (w) | Ohenahenalani (w) | Kihapiʻilani (k) | Kumaka (w) | Lonoapiʻi (k)
Keli‘iokaloa (k) | Makuahineapalaka (w) | Koihalawai (w) (Note: Fornander-1880-p.113 "[Keawenui-a-Umi]…" - "[H]is five wives, all of whom were of high and undoubted aristocratic families. These five wives were— (i.) Koihalawai or Koihalauwailaua, daughter of his sister Akahiilikapu and Kahakuma Kaliua, one of the tabu chiefs of Kauai. With this wife Keawenui had four children, three sons and a daughter: Kanaloakuaana, Kanaloakuakawaiea, Kanaloakapulehu, and Keakalavlani. (2) Haokalani, of the Kalona-iki family on Oahu, or from the great Ehu family on Hawaii through Hao-a-kapokii, the fourth in descent from Uhunui Kaimalino; the fact is not very clearly stated, though the presumption, from allusions in the legends, is in favour of the former. Her son was the celebrated Lonoikamakakiki. (3.) Hoopiliahae, whose parentage is not stated,*1 but whose son, Umiokalani, allied himself to the Maui chiefess Pii-maui-lani, and was the father of Hoolaaikaiwi, mother of the widely known and powerful Mahi family on Hawaii. (4.) Kamola-nui-a-Umi, the half-sister of Keawenui. Her daughter was Kapohelemai, who became the wife of her cousin Makua and mother of I, from whom the present reigning family descends. (5.) Hakaukalalapuakea, the granddaughter of Hakau, the brother of Umi. Her daughter was lliilikikuahine, through whom more than one family now living claims connection with the line of Liloa. All the legends mention a son of Keawenui named Pupuakea, who was endowed with lands in Kau, but none of the legends that I possess mention who his mother was. He remained true to Lonoikamakahiki when all the world forsook him, and was treated by Lono as a younger brother or very near kindred.*1 Author's note - "I have but one genealogy in which her parentage is referred to, and there she is said to be a descendant of Huanuikalalailai, through his son Kuhelaui, the brother of the Maui Paumakua.") | Keawenuiaʻumi (k) | Kamolanuiaumi (w) | Hoopiliahae W) | Kaakaupea (w)
Kukailani (k) | Kaohukiokalani (w) | Makuaakumalae (k) | Kapohelemai (w) | ʻUmiokalani (k) | Piʻimauilani (w) | Kamalalawalu (k)
Kanaloakuaʻana (k) (Note: "The children of KaikUani-Alii-Wahine-o-Puna with Kanaloakuaana were a son, Keakealanikane, and two daughters, Kealiiokalani and Kalani-o-Umi. She had no children with Lonoikamahiki, as previously stated. With his other wife, Kaikilanimaipanio, Lono had two sons, one called Keawehanauikawalu and the other Kaihikapumahana, from both of whom her Highness Ruth Keelikolani is the descendant on her father's and mother's sides.") | Kaikilani (w) | Ikanaka (k) | Kawalu (w) | Kanaloauoo (k) (Note: "Kanaloauoo was the ruling chief, the "Alii-ai-moku," he took for wife Hoolaaikaiwi, a daughter of Umiokalani and Piimauilani, and granddaughter of Keawenui-a-Umi. With this last wife he had the two sons Mahiolole and Mahihukui".) | Hoolaaikaiwi (w) | Kauhiakama (k)
Keakealanikane (k) | Kealiʻiokalani (w) | Makakaualiʻi (k) (Note: "To this period of Lono's reign belongs the episode of Iwikauikaua, another knight-errant of this stirring time. Iwikauikaua was the son of Makakaualii, who was the younger and only brother of Kaikilani-A Hi- Wahine-o-Puna. His mother was Kapukamola".) | Kapukāmola (w) | Mahiolole (k) | Kanekukailani (w) | Kalanikaumakaowākea (k) (Note: "Kalanikaumakaowakea had two wives— Kaneakauhi, or, as she was also called, Kaneakalau. With her he had a son, Lonohonuakini, who succeeded him as Moi, and a daughter, Piilaniwahine, who became the wife of Ahu-a-I, of the great I family on Hawaii, and mother of Lonomaaikanaka, the wife of Keaweikekahialiiokamoku and mother of Kalaninuiamamao. - Lonohonuakini's wife was Kalanikauanakinilani, with whom he had the following children:—Kaulahea, a son, who succeeded his father in the government; Lonomakaihonua, who was grandfather to the celebrated bard Keaulumoku; Kalaniomaiheuila, mother of Kalanikahimakeialii, the wife of Kualii of Oahu, and, through her daughter Kaionuilalahai, grandmother of Kahahana, the last independent king of Oahu, of the Oahu race of chiefs, who lost his life and his kingdom in the war with Maui in 1783".)
Keakamahana (w) (Note: "During the time of the revolt of Kanaloakuaana and the Hawaii chiefs against Lonoikamakahiki, it would appear that Iwikauikaua was already a grown-up young man, for he is reported as having espoused the cause of Lono and his aunt Kaikilani". "After this narrow escape Iwikauikaua went to Oahu, and there became the husband of Kauakahikuaanauakane, daughter of Kakuhihewa's son Kaihikapu. He is next heard of in the legends as having visited Maui, where one of his sisters, Kapukini, was the wife of the Moi Kauhi-a-Kama, and another sister, Pueopokii, was the wife of Kaaoao, the son of Makakukalani, and head of the Kaupo chief families who descended from Koo and Kaiuli. He finally returns to Hawaii, where he becomes the husband of Keakamahana, the daughter of his cousins Keakealanikane and Kealiiokalani, and who at their death became the Moi of Hawaii. When Lonoikamakahiki and Kaikilani, his wife, died, they were succeeded as Moi of Hawaii by Kaikilani's son Keakealanikane.") (Note: "The only husband known of Keakamahana was Iwikauikaua, above referred to, and with him she had a daughter called Keakealaniwahine, who succeeded her mother as Moi of Hawaii. With his other wife, the Oahu chiefess Kauakahi-kuaanaauakane, Iwikauikaua had a son, Kaneikaiwilani, who became one of the husbands of his half-sister Keakealaniwahine," "Keakealaniwahine had two husbands. The first was Kanaloaikaivrilewa, or, as he is called in some genealogies, Kanaloakapulehu. His pedigree is not given in any genealogy or legend that I have met with, but he was probably a descendant of Lonoikamakahiki's brother with the same name. The other husband was Kaneikaiwilani, who was the son of Iwikauikaua and Kaukahikuaanaauakane. With the first, Keakealani had a son named Keawe; with the second, she had a daughter named Kalanikauleleiaiwi.") | Iwikauikaua (k) | Ikuaana (w) (Note: Three sisters, Ikuaana, Umiulaakaahumanu and Umiaemoku were ancestors of King Kamehameha I and two families on the maternal side of Queen Liliuokalani. The youngest sister Umiaenaku was an ancestor of both Princess Ruth and Mrs. Bishop through Kanekapolei.) | Kū-a-Nuʻuanu (k) (Note: "Kamakaimoku's mother was Umiula-a-kaahumanu, a daughter of Mahiolole…" "Her father was Kuanuuanu, an Oahu chief, and in her childhood and youth she was brought up by her father on Oahu, her mother having gone back to Hawaii and espoused Kapahi-a-Ahu-Kane, the son of Ahu-a-I, and a younger brother of Lonomaaikanaka, the wife of Keawe. With Kuanuuanu Umiulaakaahumanu had another child, a son named Naili, who remained on Oahu, and followed his father as chief over the Waianae district".) | ʻUmiʻulaakaʻahumanu (w) | Ahu-a-ʻI (k) | Piʻilaniwahine II (w)
Kāneikaiwilani (k) | Keākealaniwahine (w) | Kanaloakapulehu (k)
Kauaua-a-Mahi (k) (Note: "[W]hen Kamehameha died in 1819 he was past eighty years old. His birth would thus fall between 1736 and 1740, probably nearer the former than the latter. His father was Kalanikupua-keoua, the half-brother of Kalaniopuu above referred to, and grandson of Keawe; his mother was Kekuiapoiwa II, a daughter of Kekelakekeokalani-a-keawe and Haae, the son of Kalanikauleleiaiwi and Kauaua-aMahi, and brother to Alapainui".) | Lonoikahaupu (k) (Note: "Whether Lonoikahaupu stopped on Oahu or Maui, or, if so, what befell him there, is not known; but on arriving at Hawaii he found that the court of Keaweikekahialiiokamoku, the Moi of Hawaii, was at the time residing in Kau. Eepairing thither, he was hospitably received, and his entertainment was correspondingly cordial, as well as sumptuous. The gay and volatile Kalanikauleleiaiwi, the imperious and high-born wife of Keawe, the Moi, became enamoured of the young Kauai chief, and after a while he was duly recognised as one of her husbands. From this union was born a son called Keawepoepoe, who became the father of those eminent Hawaii chiefs, Keeaumokupapaiahiahi, Kameeiamoku, and Kamanawa, who placed Kamehameha I. on the throne of Hawaii.") | Kalanikauleleiaiwi (w) (Note: "When grown up, Kamakaimoku was seen by Kalaninuiamamao on his visit to Oahu, and sent for to be his wife. Living with him at the court of Keawe, she bore him a son, Kalaniopuu, who afterwards became the Moi of Hawaii. This union was not of long duration, for within a year or two she left Kalaninuiamamao and became the wife of his brother, Kalanikeeaumoku, and to him she bore another son, Kalanikupuapaikalaninui Keoua, the father of Kamehameha I".) (Note: "Keawe s wives were—(1) Lonomaaikanaka, a daughter of Ahu-a-I and of Piilaniwahine. The former belonged to the powerful and widely spread I family of Hilo; the latter was the daughter of Kalanikaumakaowakea, the Moi of Maui. With her Keawe had two sons, Kalaninuiomamao and Kekohimoku} (2.) Kalanikauleleiaiwi, his half-sister, as before stated. With her he had Kalanikeeaumoku, a son, and Kekelakekeokalani, a daughter. (3.) Kanealae, a daughter of Lae, chief of the eastern parts of".) | Keaweʻīkekahialiʻiokamoku (k) (Note: "Keawe, surnamed "ikekahialiiokamoku," succeeded his mother, Keakealaniwahine, as the Moi of Hawaii. He is said to have been an enterprising and stirring chief, who travelled all over the group, and obtained a reputation for bravery and prudent management of his island. It appears that in some manner he composed the troubles that had disturbed the peace during his mother's time. It was not by force or by conquest, for in that case, and so near to our own times, some traces of it would certainly have been preserved on the legends. He probably accomplished the tranquillity of the island by diplomacy, as he himself married Lonomaaikanaka, the daughter of Ahua-I, and he afterwards married his son Kalaninuiomamao to Ahia, the granddaughter of Kuaana-a-I and cousin to Kuahuia's son, Mokulani, and thus by this double marriage securing the peace and allegiance of the Hilo chiefs.") | Lonomaʻaikanaka (w) | ʻUmiaemoku (w) (Note: "Kanekapolei is claimed by some to have been the daughter of Kauakahiakua, of the Maui royal family, and his wife Umiaemoku; by others she is said to have been of the Kau race of chiefs".)
Haʻae-a-Mahi (k) (Note: Kamakau-1992-p.68 "His mother was Ke-kuʻi-apo-iwa, daughter of Kekela and Haʻae, both of whom belonged to families of chiefs. His father was Keoua, younger brother of Ka-lani-ʻopuʻu, Ka-makaʻi-moku being the mother of both.") | Kekelakekeokalani (w) | Keawepoepoe (k) | Kanoena (w) | Kalanikeeaumoku (k) | Kalaninuiamamao (k) | Kamakaimoku (w)
Kekuʻiapoiwa II (w) | Keōua (k) | Kalaniʻōpuʻu (k) | Mahihelelima (k) | Kānekapōlei (w)
Kamehameha I

Kunuunuiakapokii (w)
Kealanaawaauli (w)
Nihokela (k)
Piʻilaniwahine I (w)
Kapukini III (w)
Kaneakauhi (w)
Lonohonuakini (k) | Kalanikauanakinilani (w)
Lonomakaihonua (k) (Note: In her book; "Hawaiian Genealogies: Extracted from Hawaiian Language Newspapers, Volume 2", Edith Kawelohea McKinzie states that the DeFries genealogy to Kauakahiakua was not supported by any accepted genealogy recorded and the correct parents were Lonomakaihonua and Kapoohiwi.) | Kapoohiwi (w)
Kauakahiakua (k) (Note: "Up to this period Kamehameha had had but two recognised wives. One was Kalola, referred to on page 201; the other was Peleuli. Her parents were Kamanawa and Kekelaokalani. The former a son of Keawepoepoe and grandson of Kalanikauleleiaiwi, of the royal Hawaii family, and the latter a daughter of Kauakahiakua and Kekuiapoiwa-Nui, both of the royal Maui family. With this Peleuli Kamehameha had four children:—(1.) Maheha Kapulikoliko, a daughter, of whom nothing more is known; (a) Kahoanoku Kinau, a son, whose wife was Kahakuhaakoi, a daughter of Kekuamanoha, of the Maui royal family, with whom he had a daughter, Keahikuni Kekauonohi, who died in 1847; (3.) Kaikookalani, a son, whose wife was Haaheo, a niece of Keawemauhili by his sister Akahi, and who afterwards became the wife of Kuakini, one of the brothers of Kaahumanu; (4.) Kiliwehi, a daughter, who became the wife of Kamehamehakauokoa".) | Kekuiapoiwa I (w)
Kamanawa (k) | Kekelaokalani (w)
Peleuli (w)

Explanatory notes and reference sources

Notes:

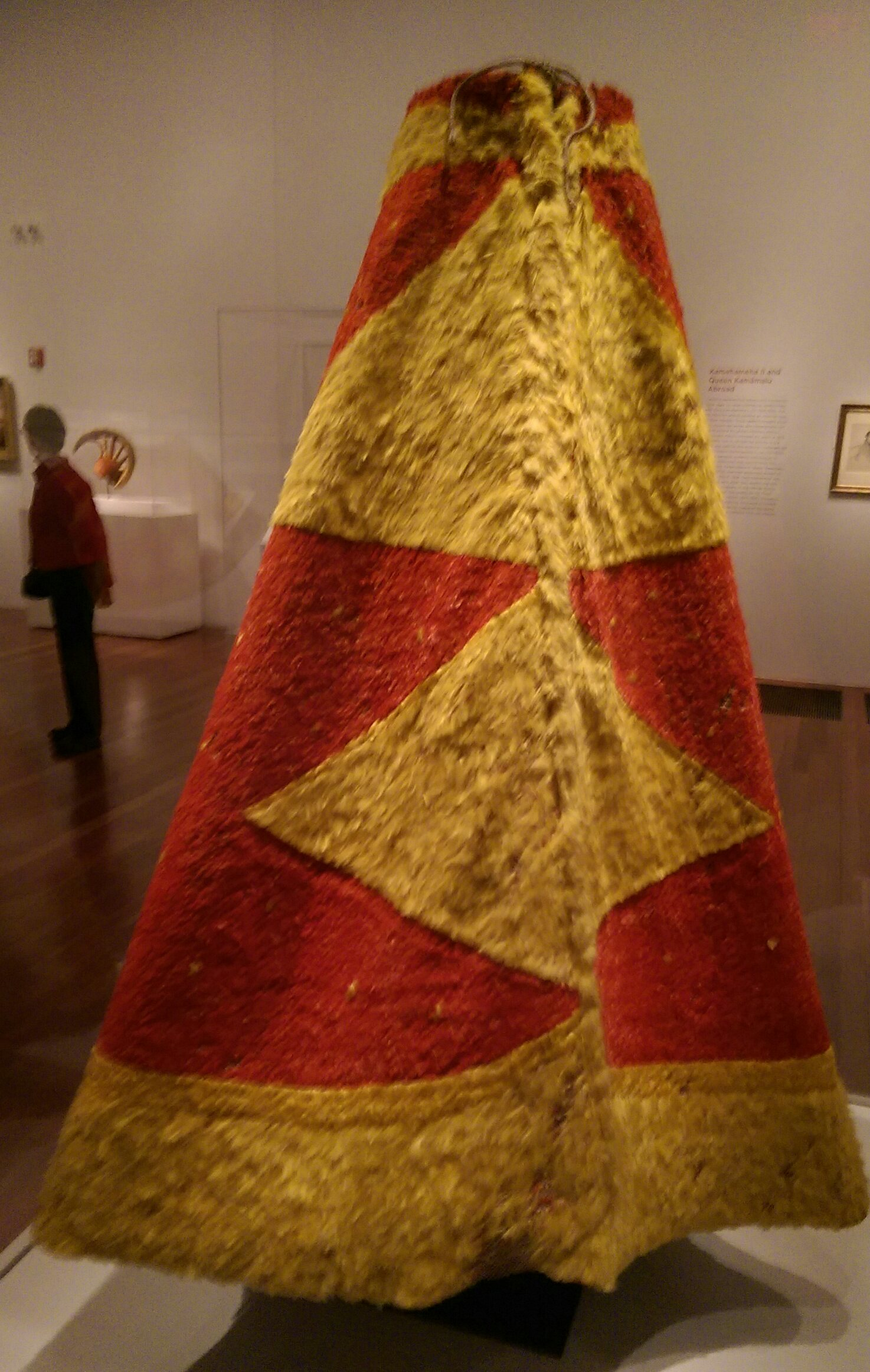
A feathered cloak associated with Kalaniʻōpuʻu, on display at the de Young Museum in San Francisco

| Preceded by Alii Kaiʻinamao Kalani-nui-i-a-mamao, 1st Aliʻi of Kau | Aliʻi of Kaʻū ?–1782 | Succeeded by Kīwalaʻō |

| Preceded by Alapaʻinuiakauaua | Ruler of Hawaiʻi Island; 1754–1782 | Succeeded by Kīwalaʻō |
