= Keawepoepoe =

Hawaiian prince

- Born: c. 1700s
- Spouse: Kūmaʻaikū; Kanoena
- Issue: Keeaumoku Pāpaiahiahi; Kamanawa; Kameʻeiamoku; Alapai Maloiki; Kaulunae
- Father: Lonoikahaupu
- Mother: Kalanikauleleiaiwi
- Religion: Hawaiian

Keawepoepoe was the son and keiki aliʻi (prince or child of a chief) of aliʻi nui (great noble or king) Lonoikahaupu and aliʻi nui wahine (great noblewoman or queen) Kalanikauleleiaiwi who became father of the royal twins, Kamanawa and Kameʻeiamoku. He was born sometime in the 1700s and was the youngest child of his mother, who was also the wife and half sister of Keaweʻīkekahialiʻiokamoku. His name means; "round Keawe". Due to his high rank from both parents as well as his father's status as a Kauaian Lono priest, Keawepoepoe was given the kapu o pahenakalani (the prostrating kapu). His lineage through his mother makes him a descendant of Haloa through Keakealanikane.

== Birth and early life ==
Lonoikahaupu, who had peacefully inherited the western side of Kauai as ruler, had embarked on a tour of the islands along with a huge entourage of double hulled canoes carrying musicians, dancers as well as the monarch's main navigator, priest, astrologer and an entire retinue of attendants. He may have visited Oahu, Molokai and Maui and then set off to visit the Island of Hawaii, which was ruled by Keaweʻīkekahialiʻiokamoku and his half sister Kalanikauleleiaiwi. Lonoikahaupu was entertained with festivities and amusements for weeks by the royal couple of Hawaii Island. During this period Kalanikauleleiaiwi became captivated with the Kauaian ruler and took him as one of her recognized husbands. From this union Keawepoepoe was born. He was the youngest child and possibly his mother's favorite. As he grew he was considered a handsome young man who charmed many young women.

As the son of Kalanikauleleiaiwi and Lonoikahaupu, monarch's of several kingdoms between them, Keawepoepoe was an aliʻi (noble) of Hawaii, Maui, Oahu and Kauai. As well being the aliʻi nui (great king or supreme monarch) Lonoikahaupu was a kahuna (priest) of the order of Lono (order of Nahulu or Holoa'e), one of two priestly orders, Kū (Kuali'i or Kauali'i) being the other. Through this union Keawepoepoe received the kapu o pahenakalani (the prostrating kapu) which is how the Hawaii aliʻi received the kapu (a religious code of conduct) called the kapu moe. In the Hawaiian language Keawepoepoe translates as; "round Keawe".

=== Lineage ===
Keawepoepoe, Alapainui and Kauaua a Mahi were all descendants of Luahine (k), who was the youngest of three brothers including Palena and Paia, all of whom were of the same mother and father. The three brothers had saved the life of Kuaana when Keakealaniwahine ordered his death by drowning. The brothers persuaded the monarch to set him adrift on a raft rather than having him put to death. Once the raft had drifted out of the site of land, the three brothers aided Kuaana to a safe landing on Maui. The Luahine descendants connect to the lineage of Haloa through Keakealanikane.

== Wives, children and grandchildren ==
Keawepoepoe was the father of Keeaumoku Pāpaiahiahi, the royal Twins, Kamanawa and Kameʻeiamoku as well as Alapai Maloiki and Kaulunae. The first thee three brothers, along with Keawe-a-Heulu were the principle warriors that assisted Kamehameha I conquer all but the island of Kauai. Keeaumoku's mother was Kūmaʻaikū, who was also the mother of Alapai Maloiki and Kaulunae. Abraham Fornander mentions Keeaumoku as the son of Keawepoepoe several times. In; "The Polynesian Race Volume II" on page 132 Fornander states all three, Keeaumoku, Kamanawa and Kameʻeiamoku are the sons of Keawepoepoe however, on page 154 he also states that Kamanawa and Kameʻeiamoku were the "tabbooed twin children of Kekaulike (King of Maui)". While there are legends that refer to Kamanawa and Kameʻeiamoku as the children of Kekaulike, Fornander stated that all the genealogies he had seen have Keawepoepoe as their father and Kanoena, daughter of Lonoanahulu (k) of the Ehu family. According to Almira Hollander Pitman in her 1931 publication; "After fifty years: an appreciation, and a record of a unique incident", Pitman states that Kanoena was Keawepoepoe's cousin.

His grandchildren include Ulumāheihei Hoapili who was the father of Kuini Liliha. Hoapili was the son of Kameʻeiamoku making him cousins to Kaʻahumanu and her brothers and sisters, Kalākua Kaheiheimālie, Kahekili Keʻeaumoku II, Kuakini, and Namahana Piʻia, the children of Keeaumoku Pāpaiahiahi. Through Kamanawa, Keawepoepoe had another granddaughter by the name of Peleuli. She became a wife of Kamehameha I shortly before the monarch took her cousin Kaʻahumanu as another wahine (wife).

== Legacy ==
Keawepoepoe's descendants include the families of Liliha, Hoolulu, Kinimaka, Piianaia, Keeaumoku II and the House of Kawānanakoa. He is a direct ancestor of King William Charles Lunalilo through his mother Kekāuluohi, as well as both King David Kalākaua and Queen Liliʻuokalani through their father Caesar Kapaʻakea. The lands known as "Kapalilua" in Kona, Hawaii were passed from Umi-a-Liloa to his daughter Napunanahunui in perpetuity and remained in the hands of her descendants throughout the rest of Hawaiian history until the time of Kamehameha The great when they had then passed to Keeaumoku Pāpaiahiahi from his mother Kūmaʻaikū and her family which included Iwakaualii and Iama, going back eight generations.

== Ancestry ==
Keawepoepoe family tree

Family tree based on Abraham Fornander's; "An Account of the Polynesian Race" and other works from the author, Queen Liliuokalani's; "Hawaii's Story by Hawaii's Queen", Samuel Mānaiakalani Kamakau's; "Ruling Chiefs of Hawaii" and other works by the author, John Papa ʻĪʻī's; "Fragments of Hawaiian History", Edith Kawelohea McKinzie's; "Hawaiian Genealogies: Extracted from Hawaiian Language Newspapers, Vol. I & II", Kanalu G. Terry Young's; "Rethinking the Native Hawaiian Past", Charles Ahlo, Jerry Walker, and Rubellite Kawena Johnson's; "Kamehameha's Children Today", The Hawaiian Historical Society Reports, the genealogies of the Hawaiian Royal families in Kingdom of Hawaii probate, the works of Sheldon Dibble and David Malo as well as the Hawaii State Archive genealogy books.
(k) = Kane (Hawaiian for male or husband). (w) = Wahine (female or wife). Hawaiian genealogies use these as indicators for gender instead of (m) and (f)

Kauihi-a-Hiwa (k)	Kueluakawai (w)
Kealohi kanakamaikai (k)	Kaneiahaka (w)
Kainaaila (k)	Kapulauki (w)	Kauākahikua ʻanaʻauakāne (w)	Iwikauikaua (k)	Keakamahana (w)
Kauakahilau (k)	Kuluina (w)	Kāneikaiwilani (k)	Keākealaniwahine (w)	Kanaloakapulehu (k)	Ahu-a-ʻI (k)	Piʻilaniwahine (w)
Kamuokaumeheiwa (w)	Lonoikahaupu (k)	Kalanikauleleiaiwi (w)	Kauaua-a-Mahi (k)	Keaweʻīkekahi aliʻiokamoku (k)	Lonomaʻaikanaka (w)
Kaumeheiwa (k)	Kaʻapuwai (w)	Keawepoepoe (k)	Kūmaʻaikū (w)	Kanoena (w)	Haʻae-a-mahi (k)	Kekelakekeokalani (w)	Kalanikeʻeaumoku (k)	Kamakaimoku (w)	Kalaninuiamamao (k)
Kaeokulani (k)	Kamakahelei (w)	Kameʻeiamoku (k)	Kamakaʻeheikuli (w)	Keeaumoku; Pāpaiahiahi (k)	Nāmāhānaʻi Kaleleokalani (w)	Kamanawa (k)	Kekelaokalani (w)	Kekuʻiapoiwa II (w)	Keōua (k)	Kalola Pupuka (w)	Kalaniʻōpuʻu (k)
Kapuaamohu (w)	Kaumualii (k)	Kepookalani (k)	Alapai Wahine (w)	Keohohiwa (w)	Kaheiheimālie (w)	Namahana Piʻia (w)	Peleuli (w)	Kamehameha I (k)	Kekuiapoiwa Liliha (w)	Kīwalaʻō (k)
Kaʻahumanu (w)	Kalaʻimamahu (k)	Kahōʻanokū Kīnaʻu (k)	Wahinepio (w)	Palila Nohomualani (k)	Moana (w)	Keōpūolani (w)
Kinoiki Kekaulike (w)	Kūhiō Kalanianaʻole (k)	Kealiʻiahonui (k)	Kekauʻōnohi (w)	Levi Haʻalelea (k)	Eia (k)	Kauwā (w)
Kamanawa II (k) _{(c. 1785 – October 20, 1840)} (Note: Forbes-1998-p. 256 "Twelve days after the first Hawaiian Constitution was signed, a chief, Kamanawa II, grandfather of future monarchs David Kalakaua and Lydia Makaeha Liliuokalani, was hung for the murder of his wife. The method used was poison, and after a trial by jury, Kamanawa and Lonoapuakau (spelled Lonopuakau in title), captain of the Hawaiian vessel Hooikaika, were convicted. The sentence of death was set by the premier (Kekauluohi) and agreed upon by the king only after a long consultation with Commander Charles Wilkes of the United States Exploring Expedition. This is the printed order setting the date of execution for October 20, 1840.")	Kamokuiki (w) _{(died 1840)} (Note: Yalom-2008-p. 241 "Kamokuiki Died 1840")	ʻAikanaka (k) _{(died 1837)} (Note: Andrews-1865-p. 557 "1837. Aikanaka died.")	Kamaʻeokalani (w)	Iʻahuʻula (w)	Naihekukui (k)
Kapaakea (k) _{(1815 – November 13, 1866)} (Note: Forbes-1998-p. 428 "[Caesar Kapaakea] He died in Honolulu on November 13, 1866")	Keohokālole (w) _{(died April 6, 1869)} (Note: Stauffer-2004-p. 61 "[Keohokālole] died in Hilo on April 6, 1869.")	Kekāuluohi (w) _{(c. 1794 (Note: Kamehiro-2009- p. 61 "High Chiefess Kekāuluohi (ca. 1794–1845), premier, wife of Kamehameha I, and mother of King Lunalilo, built her house at this site, on the premises known as Pohukaina") – June 7, 1845 (Note: Kam - 2017- p.205 "Hawaiian Gazette lists “Kekauluohi, Mother of Lunalilo, died June 7, 1845."))}	Charles Kanaʻina (k) _{(May 4, 1798 – March 13, 1877)}	Kamāmalu (w) _{(c. 1802–1824)}	Kamehameha II (k) _{(c. 1797 – July 14, 1824)}	Kīnaʻu (w) _{(c. 1805 – April 4, 1839)}	Kekūanaōʻa (k) _{(c. 1791 – November 24, 1868)}	Kamehameha III (k) _{(March 17, 1814 – December 15, 1854)}	Kalama (w) (_{1817–September 20, 1870)}
Kapiʻolani (w) _{(December 31, 1834 – June 24, 1899)}	Kalākaua (k) _{(November 16, 1836 – January 20, 1891)}	Liliʻuokalani (w) _{(September 2, 1838 – November 11, 1917)}	John Owen Dominis (k) _{(March 10, 1832 – August 23, 1891)}	Lunalilo (k) _{(January 31, 1835 – February 3, 1874)}

== Bibliography ==
- Fornander, Abraham (1880). An Account of the Polynesian Race: Its Origins and Migrations, and the Ancient History of the Hawaiian People to the Times of Kamehameha I. Trubner & Company. ISBN 978-0804800020. OCLC 4807.
- Barrère, Dorothy Benton (1994). The King's Mahele: The Awardees and Their Lands. D.B. Barrère. p. 265. ASIN B0006PCCKU. OCLC 31886789.
- Dibble, Sheldon (1843). History of the Sandwich Islands. Press of the Mission Seminary. ISBN 978-0342261093. OCLC 2145112.
- Star-Bulletin, Honolulu (1899). All about Hawaii: The Recognized Book of Authentic Information on Hawaii, Combined with Thrum's Hawaiian Annual and Standard Guide. Honolulu Star-Bulletin. OCLC 1663720.
- ʻĪʻī, John Papa (1959). Fragments of Hawaiian History. Bishop Museum Press. ISBN 978-0-910240-31-4. OCLC 583447423.
- Kalakaua, David (1888). The Legends and Myths of Hawaii: The Fables and Folk-lore of a Strange People. C.L. Webster. ISBN 978-0935180862. OCLC 1043762036.
- McKinzie, Edith Kawelohea (1983). Hawaiian Genealogies: Extracted from Hawaiian Language Newspapers - volume 1. University of Hawaii Press. ISBN 978-0-939154-28-9. OCLC 12555087.
- McKinzie, Edith Kawelohea (1986). Hawaiian Genealogies: Extracted from Hawaiian Language Newspapers - volume 2. University of Hawaii Press. ISBN 978-0-939154-37-1.
- Pitman, Almira Hollander (1931). After fifty years: an appreciation, and a record of a unique incident. Priv. print., The Plimpton press. OCLC 3703871.
- Sahlins, Marshall (October 1996). How "Natives" Think: About Captain Cook, For Example. University of Chicago Press. ISBN 978-0-226-73369-2.
- Westervelt, W.D. (1910). Hawaiian Historical Society - Annual report, year ending December 31, 1909. Paradise of the Pacific Press.
