= Kalanikauleleiaiwi =

Aliʻi Nui of Hawaiʻi
- Reign: c. 1695 - c. 1730
- Predecessor: Keakealaniwahine
- Successor: Alapaʻi
- Co-ruler: Keaweʻīkekahialiʻiokamoku
- Died: 1730
- Spouse: Kaulahea II; Keaweʻīkekahialiʻiokamoku; Kauaua-a-Mahi; Lonoikahaupu
- Issue: Kekūʻiapoiwa I Keʻeaumoku Nui; Kekelaokalani I Alapaʻi; Hāʻae-a-Mahi; Keawepoepoe; Kanoena
- House: House of Keawe
- Father: Kāneikaiwilani
- Mother: Keakealaniwahine

Kalanikauleleiaiwi was a High Chiefess (aliʻi nui) of the island of Hawaiʻi. She was considered to be the co-ruler of the island of Hawaiʻi with her half-brother, Keaweʻīkekahialiʻiokamoku, the 21st Aliʻi nui of Hawaii. Their shared mother was Keakealaniwahine, the previous Aliʻi Nui of Hawaii. Their son, Keʻeaumoku Nui, was considered the highest rank of Piʻo and the rightful successor in rank to his father and mother, in contrast to his half-brother Alapaʻi, who usurped the throne of Hawaiʻi.

Kalanikauleleiaiwi was considered to have higher rank than her half-brother and co-ruler, owing to her paternal descent from the Oʻahu dynasty of Kākuhihewa. Her father was their mother's half-brother Kāneikaiwilani, who was the son of Iwikauikaua and Kauākahikuaʻanaʻauakāne of Oʻahu. Both her parents shared the High Chief Iwikauikaua of Oʻahu as their father. (whose symbol was a torch burned at midday, later copied by his descendant Kalākaua.)

Her family background has been compared to that of Keōpūolani, with the political power and influence of Kaʻahumanu. She had four husbands and through her descendants was the great-grandmother of Kamehameha I who founded the Kingdom of Hawaiʻi.

== Marriages and descendants ==
Kalanikauleleiaiwi had four husbands and had children by all of them.

Her first marriage was with Kaulahea II, the king of Maui, in her early youth. For unknown reasons, she left him and returned to the island of Hawaiʻi. Their daughter was Kekūʻiapoiwa. Kekūʻiapoiwa remained on Maui and married her half-brother Kekaulike, founding the Kekaulike Dynasty of Maui which produced many chief politicians and nobles in the early days of the Kingdom of Hawaiʻi.

On returning to the land of her mother, she married her half-brother, Keaweʻikekahialiʻiokamoku to whom she bore a son Keʻeaumoku Nui and a daughter Kekelaokalani I.

Her third husband was Kauaua-a-Mahi, son of Mahiolole, the great Kohala chief of the Mahi family. With him she had two sons, Alapaʻinui and Hāʻae-a-Mahi.

Her fourth and last husband was the High Chief Lonoikahaupu, one of the highest ranking chiefs of Kauaʻi and a fifth generation descendant of Kahakumakapāweo. With him she had her last children, Keawepoepoe and Kanoena, who were the parents of Kameʻeiamoku and Kamanawa; another son of Keawepoepoe (with a different mother) was Keʻeaumoku Pāpaʻiahiahi. These three, together with Keawe-a-Heulu, were the four principal chiefs that assisted Kamehameha I to conquer and consolidate the Hawaiian Islands, and who became his counsellors after the conquest.

Her descendants are among the forefathers of several Hawaiian royal houses:

1. Kekaulike, through her eldest daughter Kekuiapoiwa.
2. House of Keoua, through her son Kalanikeʻeaumoku and daughter Kekelaokalani I.
3. House of Kalākaua and House of Kawānanakoa, through her son Keawepoepoe.

== Ancestry ==
Ancestors of Kalanikauleleiaiwi

16. Kukailani (=24)
8. Makakaualii (=12)
17. Kaohukiokalani (=25)
4. Iwikauikaua
9. Kapukamola (=13)
19. Kanakeawe (=27)
2. Kaneikaiwilani
20. Kakuhihewa
10. Kaihikapuakakuhihewa
21. Kahaiaonuiakauailana
5. Kauakahikuaanaauakane
22. Hoalani
11. Ipuwai-a-Hoalani
23. Kauakamakaohua
1. Kalanikauleleiaiwi
24. Kukailani (=16)
12. Makakaualii (=8)
25. Kaohukiokalani (=17)
6. Iwikauikaua
13. Kapukamola (=9)
27. Kanakeawe (=19)
3. Keakealaniwahine
28. Kanaloakuaana
14. Keakealanikane
29. Kaikilani
7. Keakamahana
30. Kanaloakuaana
15. Kealiiokalani
31. Kaikilani
