= Keōua Kūʻahuʻula =

- Ali'i Nui of Ka'ū
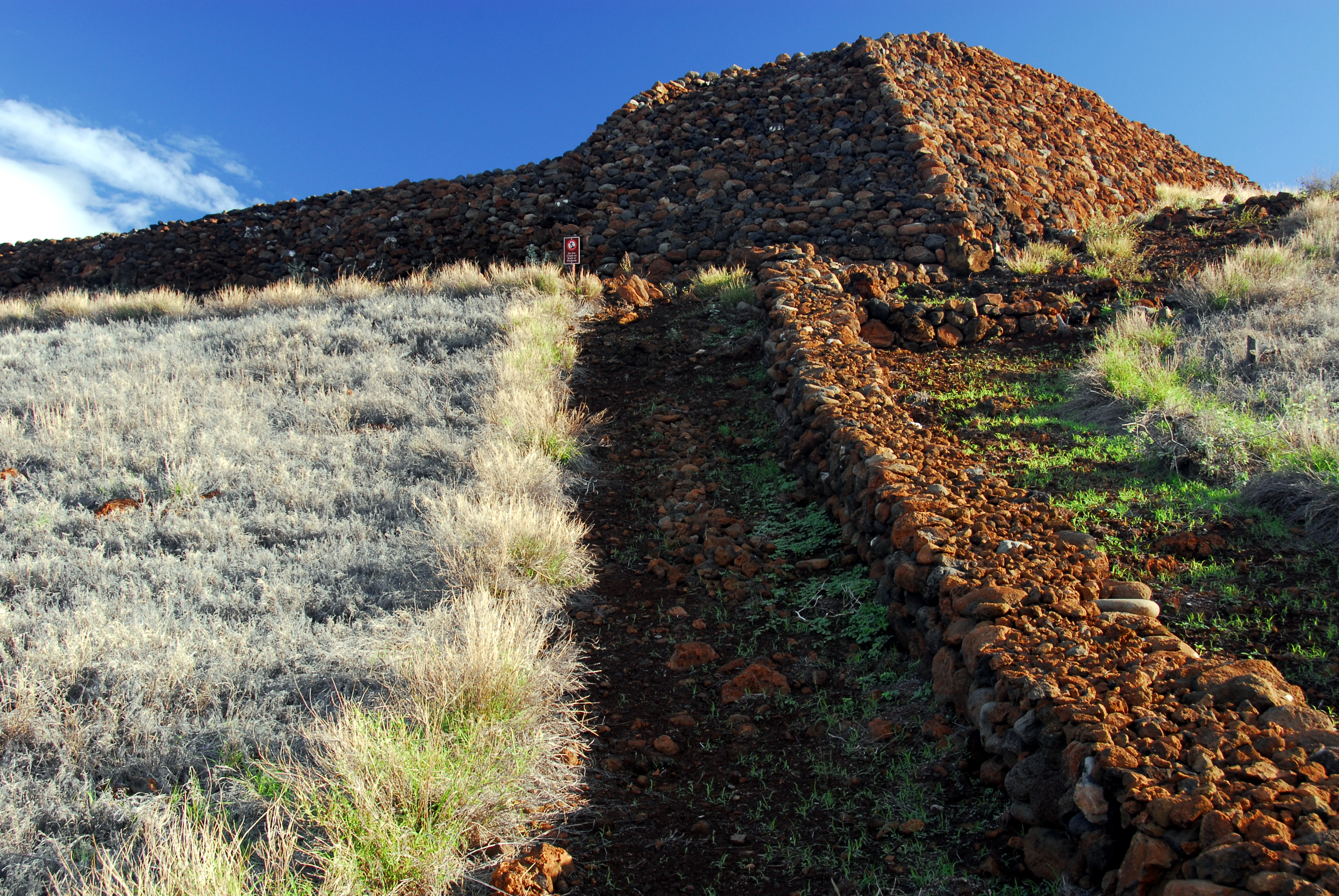
- The site of his death is a National Historic Landmark
- Born: c. 1762
- Died: 1791 (aged 28–29); Puʻukoholā Heiau
- Spouse: Kaʻiolaniokaʻiwalani
- House: Keawe
- Father: Kalaniʻōpuʻu
- Mother: Kānekapōlei

Keōua Kūʻahuʻula was an aliʻi (member of the royal class) during the time of the unification of the Kingdom of Hawaiʻi.

== Family ==
His name means "rain cloud of the red cloak".

His father was Kalaniʻōpuʻu, the king at the time of the arrival of Captain James Cook.

His mother was Kānekapōlei, one of the later wives of Kalaniʻōpuʻu, and mother of Pauli Kaʻōleiokū, the grandfather of Bernice Pauahi Bishop and Ruth Keelikolani.

This meant his older half-brother Kīwalaʻō was in line to inherit the kingdom.

== Later life ==
He was not happy, however, to receive no lands after his father died in 1781. He challenged his cousin Kamehameha I, resulting in the Battle of Mokuʻōhai. He escaped the battle to relatives in the Kaʻū district to the South in 1782. Although Kamehameha controlled the West side of the island, repeated raids never resulted in a clear victory for either side.

In 1790, after escaping another attack, his party was caught in an eruption of Kilauea, and lost two thirds of his army to lava. He was killed in 1791 when Kamehameha invited him to the Puʻukoholā Heiau in Kohala. He was captured in what is sometimes called the Battle of Kawaihae, and Keōua's body offered as a sacrifice to sanctify the new temple.

He may have mutilated himself before landing so as to render himself an inappropriate sacrificial victim. As he stepped on shore, one of Kamehameha's chiefs threw a spear at him. By some accounts he dodged it, but was then cut down by musket fire. Caught by surprise, Keōua's bodyguards were killed.

Keoua had many wives including Kaʻiolaniokaʻiwalani, Hiʻileiohiiaka, Nalaniewalu and Luahiwa. He had several daughters and two sons. He was the last independent district ruler on the island of Hawaiʻi.

Preceded by Kiwalaʻo	Aliʻi Nui of Kaʻū; 1782-1791	Succeeded by Kamehameha I part of Kingdom of Hawaii
