= Keaweʻīkekahialiʻiokamoku =

17th century King of Hawaii Island

- King of Hawaii; Aliʻi Aimoku of Hawaii
- Predecessor: Keakealaniwahine
- Successor: Kalaniʻōpuʻu
- Born: c. 1660
- Died: c. 1725
- Spouse: (Partial List); Lonomaʻaikanaka; Kalanikauleleiaiwi; Kanealai; Kauhiokaka; Malaeakini ʻUmiulaikaʻahumanu; Kaleipulou; Hoakalani; Papaikaniaunui others
- Issue: (Partial List); Kalaninuiamamao; Kekohimoku; Keʻeaumoku Nui; Kekelakekeokalani; Hao; Awili; Kumukoa; Kaliloamoku; Kekaulike-i-Kawekiuonalani; Ahuula-a-Keawe; Kaui-o-kalani-Kauauaamahi; Kaolohaka-a-Keawe; Kanuha; Kauhiololi; Kaoio-a-Keawe
- House: House of Keawe
- Father: Kanaloakapulehu
- Mother: Keakealaniwahine
- Religion: Hawaiian religion

Keaweʻīkekahialiʻiokamoku (c. 1660 – c. 1725) was the king of Hawaiʻi Island in the late 17th century. He was the great-grandfather of Kamehameha I, the first King of the Kingdom of Hawaii, and was a progenitor of the House of Keawe.

== Biography ==
Keawe was believed to have lived from 1660 to 1725. He was son of Keakealaniwahine, the ruling Queen of Hawaii and Kanaloakapulehu. He is sometimes referred to as King Keawe II, since prior to him his ancestor was Keawe-nui-a-'Umi. His full name Keawe-ʻī-kekahi-aliʻi-o-ka-moku means "Keawe, the foremost chief of the island".

Keaweʻīkekahialiʻiokamoku, a strong leader, ruled over much of the Big Island except the district of Hilo which was still independent during his lifetime. He is said to have been an enterprising and stirring chief, who traveled all over the eight islands, and obtained a reputation for bravery and prudent management of his island. It appears that in some manner he composed the troubles that had disturbed the peace during his mother's time; mainly the conflict between the independent ʻĪ family of Hilo. It was not by force or by conquest, for in that case, and so near to our times, some traces of it would certainly have been preserved in the legends. He probably accomplished the tranquility of the island through diplomacy, as he himself married Lonomaʻaikanaka, the daughter of Ahu-a-ʻI, and he afterwards married his son Kalaninuiomamao to Ahia, the granddaughter of Kuaʻana-a-ʻI and cousin to Kuahuia's son, Mokulani, and thus by this double marriage securing the peace and allegiance of the Hilo chiefs. The other districts do not seem to have shared in the resistance made by the Hilo chiefs to the authority of the King, at least the name of no district chief of note or influence has been recorded as having been so engaged.

He ruled along with his half-sister wife Kalanikauleleiaiwi who inherited their mother kapu rank. After his death, a civil war broke out over succession between his sons, Keʻeaumoku and Kalaninuiʻamamao, and a rival chief known as Alapaʻinui, who was the son of his sister Kalanikauleleiaiwi and Kauakahilau-a-Mahi, son of Chief Mahiolole (Mahiololi) of the Kohala district. Alapaʻinui emerged victorious over the two brothers and their orphan sons (including Kamehameha I's father), who were absorbed into his clan. Hale o Keawe was an ancient Hawaiian heiau originally built as the burial site for Keaweʻīkekahialiʻiokamoku. Today the reconstructed temple is part of the Puʻuhonua o Hōnaunau National Historical Park.

The House of Kalākaua and the House of Kawānanakoa descend from his eldest son Kalaninuiʻamamao. He could be called the father of Hawaii.

The House of Kamehameha and the House of Laʻanui descend from his second son Keʻeaumoku Nui.

== Ancestry ==
Ancestors of Keaweʻīkekahialiʻiokamoku

16. Prince Kukailani of Hawaii (=22 & 24)
8. High Chief Makakaualii (=12)
17. Princess Kaohukiokalani of Hawaii (=23 & 25)
4. High Chief Uminuikukailani
9. High Chiefess Ka'akauawao
2. High Chief Kanaloaikaiwilenakapulehu
20. Keawenuiaumi of Hawaiʻi
10. King Kanaloakuaana of Hawaii (=28 & 30)
21. Princess Koihalauwailaua of Kauai
5. Princess Kalani-o-ʻUmi of Hawaii
22. Prince Kukailani of Hawaii (=16 & 24)
11. Kaikilani of Hawaii (=29 & 31)
23. Princess Kaohukiokalani of Hawaiʻi (=17 & 25)
1. Keaweikekahialiʻiokamoku of Hawaiʻi
24. Prince Kukailani of Hawaii (=16, 22)
12. High Chief Makakaualii (=8)
25. Princess Kaohukiokalani of Hawaiʻi (=17 & 23)
6. High Chief Iwikauikaua
13. High Chiefess Kapukamola
27. Princess Kanakeawe of Hawaii
3. Keakealaniwahine of Hawaii
28. King Kanaloakuaana of Hawaiʻi (=10 & 30)
14. Keakealanikane of Hawaii
29. Kaikilani of Hawaii (=11 & 31)
7. Keakamahana of Hawaii
30. King Kanaloakuaana of Hawaii (=10 & 28)
15. Princess Kealiiokalani of Hawaii
31. Kaikilani of Hawaii (=11 & 29)

Preceded by Keakealaniwahine	Aliʻi Aimoku of Hawaiʻi c.1695–c.1725	Succeeded by Kalaniʻōpuʻu
