= House of Keawe =

Royal house in ancient Hawaii

House of Keawe (Keawe Dynasty; Hawaiian: Hale o Keawe) is a name of one royal house in ancient Hawaii. The dynasty was founded by the King Keaweʻīkekahialiʻiokamoku of Hawaii.

== Etymology ==
This dynasty bears the name of Keaweʻīkekahialiʻiokamoku, who was also known as Keawe II.

He himself was named after the King Keawenui of Hawaii.

In the Hawaiian language, the word has several meanings. Keawe means southern cross and is said to be the name of an ancient chief as well as meaning; "the bearer" (ke-a-we).

== Members ==
- Keaweʻīkekahialiʻiokamoku – King of Hawaii, son of Queen Keākealaniwahine
- Lonomaʻaikanaka – First wife of Keaweʻīkekahialiʻiokamoku and daughter of Piʻilaniwahine of Maui
- Kalanikauleleiaiwi – Half-sister and second wife of Keaweʻīkekahialiʻiokamoku
- Kaneʻalai – Third wife of Keaweʻīkekahialiʻiokamoku and Queen of Molokai
- Kalaninuiamamao – Son of Keaweʻīkekahialiʻiokamoku
- Kalanikeʻeaumoku – Son of Keaweʻīkekahialiʻiokamoku and his half-sister
- Keawemaʻuhili – Chief of Hilo, Hawaii
- Kamakaʻīmoku – Wife of Kalaninuiamamao and Kalanikeʻeaumoku
- Alapaʻiwahine – Daughter of Kalaninuiamamao
- Kalaniʻōpuʻu – King of Hawaii
- Keōua – Son of Keeaumoku (House of Keōua)
