= Kalaninuiamamao =

Hawaiian prince

- Spouse: Kamakaimoku; Kekaulike-i-Kawekiuonalani; Kapaihi-a-Ahu; Kalanikumaikiekia; Kaolanialii
- Issue: Kalaniʻōpuʻu; Keawemauhili; Alapaiwahine
- House: House of Keawe
- Father: Keaweʻīkekahialiʻiokamoku
- Mother: Lonomaaikanaka

Kalaninuiamamao (sometimes called Ka-I-i-Mamao or Kaeamamao) was a prince of the Big Island of Hawaiʻi, or 1st Aliʻi Nui of Kaʻū, an ancestor of the Queen Liliuokalani. He is probably the Hawaiian chief with the most varied spelling of his name.

The Kumulipo was composed in honor of his birth and was passed by him to his daughter Alapaʻiwahine. He was called Lonoikamakahiki III in this chant.

== Biography ==
Kalaninuiamamao was born of Keaweʻīkekahialiʻiokamoku, aliʻi nui of Hawaii, and his wife Lonomaaikanaka. He was his father's eldest son, but his rank was considered minor because of the distant relationship of his father and mother, unlike his brother Keeaumoku Nui who was the son of Princess Kalanikauleleiaiwi.

During his father's lifetime, he had established Kaiʻiʻmamao as Aliʻi Aimoku, principal chief of the District of Kaʻū. After the death of their father, the Big Island was divided with the brothers controlling only the Northern portions of the Big Island since Mokulani, who ruled over Hilo, Hāmākua, and part of Puna, declared himself independent of the two brothers, who apparently were unable to enforce their claims to the throne. Legend has it, that after Keawe's death, while both brothers were living in their respective territories a quarrel arose between them over the claim to the Big Island throne, and that Kaiʻiʻmamao was killed, or caused to be killed, by Keʻeaumoku Nui. One version of legend states that he was deposed ("Wailani") by the landholders ("Makaʻainana") of Kaʻū, who were a notoriously and proverbially turbulent people, frequently deposing, and even slaying, their chiefs, when, either from popular caprice of personal tyranny, they had become unpopular.

Kalaniʻōpuʻu, the son of Kalaninuiamamao assumed the lordship of his father's land as his patrimonial estate. Kalaniʻōpuʻu later passed it as such from him to his son Kīwalaʻō.

== Consorts and children ==
Kalaninuiamamao visited Kauai as well as Oahu, where he fell in love with the Chiefess Kamakaimoku, and engaged her to come to Hawaii as his bride. Living with him at the court of his father, they had a son Kalaniʻōpuʻu, who afterwards succeeded him. Their union was not of long duration, for within a year or two she left him and became the wife of his brother Keeaumoku Nui, and to him she bore another son, Keōua. Kalaninuiamamao married again to his half-sister, Princess Kekaulike-i-Kawekiuonalani. His third wife was Kapaihi-a-Ahu, the daughter of Ahu. His fourth wife was Kalanikumaikiekia. His fifth wife was his own daughter Kaolanialii. He had issues, two sons and two daughters. His second son by his second wife was Keawemauhili. His eldest daughter, by Kapaihi, was Kaolanialii who became his fifth wife. His youngest daughter and granddaughter by his fifth wife was Alapaiwahine. From Keawemauhili descended the House of Kawānanakoa, and from Alapaiwahine descended the House of Kalākaua.
