= Keʻeaumoku Pāpaʻiahiahi =

Hawaiian high chief (1736–1804)

- Born: c. 1736
- Died: March 21, 1804
- Spouse: Nāmāhānaʻi Kaleleokalani
- Issue: Kaʻahumanu; Kalākua Kaheiheimālie; Kahekili Keʻeaumoku II; Kuakini; Namahana Piʻia
- Father: Keawepoepoe
- Mother: Kūmaʻaikū

Keʻeaumoku Pāpaʻiahiahi (c. 1736–1804) was a Hawaiian high chief and the father of Kaʻahumanu. He was the principal agent in elevating Kamehameha I to the throne of Hawaiʻi and served in a capacity similar to commander in chief or Prime Minister. He is sometimes referred to as Keʻeaumoku II Pāpaʻiahiahi numbering Keʻeaumoku Nui as the first and his son as the third.

== Life ==
His father was Hawaiʻi island chief Keawepoepoe and his mother was Kūmaʻaikū. He was called Keʻeaumoku by the people which literally means the Island-climbing Swimmer. Keʻeaumoku was a warlike and ambitious chief of the Kona district of Hawaiʻi island. He was among the first of five Kona chiefs to back Kamehameha I against his cousin Kiwalaʻo. The four other Kona chiefs were: High Chief Kalua‘apana Keaweāheulu, Kamehameha’s uncle; Kekūhaupiʻo, Kamehameha's warrior teacher; Kame'eiamoku and Kamanawa, half-brothers of Keʻeaumoku on their father's side.

In 1782, at the Battle of Mokuʻōhai near Keʻei, Kona, Keʻeaumoku led Kamehameha's warriors to victory, and Kīwalaʻō was killed. Kīwalaʻō was wearing an ʻahu ʻula (red feather cloak), which then became the property of Kamehameha (this feathered cloak is now in the collection of the Bishop Museum). One account states that the injured Keʻeaumoku Pāpaʻiaheahe crawled to Kīwalaʻō, who also had been injured, and then Keʻeaumoku Pāpaʻiaheahe slit the neck of Kīwalaʻō with a leiomano (shark-tooth weapon). He was commander-in-chief of Kamehameha's forces in most of his war campaigns. He served as Counsellor of State and was Kamehameha's prime minister.

On his first visit of his Expedition of 1791–1795, Keʻeaumoku convinced George Vancouver to trust Kamehameha, leading to two return visits and an important alliance with the British. Vancouver, who spelled his name "Kahowmotoo", left some goats and returned the next year to find them thriving.

While preparing for an invasion of Kauaʻi island against King Kaumualiʻi, an epidemic called maʻi ʻōkuʻu (likely cholera) infected King Kamehameha and many of his troops, killing thousands. Many of Kamehameha’s warriors died from the disease. Among them was Keʻeaumoku on March 21, 1804.

== Family ==
He married Nāmāhānaʻi Kaleleokalani, the widow queen of Kamehamehanui Ailuau, the late king of Maui. Namahana's brother, King Kahekili II, who was King of Maui, was displeased that Namahana had taken Keʻeaumoku for her husband, and he became Keʻeaumoku's enemy. The people, including Namahana, stood in great fear of him, so she hid their first-born child in a cave at Hāna, on Maui, at the very foot of the old battle hill, Kauiki. This child was Kaʻahumanu who would one day be the most powerful woman in the Hawaiian Kingdom. He married his daughter to Kamehameha when she was only 13 year of age and she soon became Kamehameha's favourite wife. He and Namahana gave birth to two other daughters Kaheiheimālie and Namahana Piʻia who also married Kamehameha. His eldest son, also named Keʻeaumoku, served as Governor of Maui under the name George Cox Keʻeaumoku, and his youngest son John Adams Kuakini served as Governor of Hawaiʻi Island and Oahu. He and his children were a most influential family of Hawaii in the beginning days of the Hawaiian Kingdom. Keʻeaumoku's great-grandsons Kamehameha IV, Kamehameha V and Lunalilo ruled Hawaii from 1855 to 1874.

Preceded by new creation	Commander in chief Kingdom of Hawaii c. 1782 – c. 1795	Succeeded by Kalanimoku
Preceded by new creation	Governor of Maui; 1795–1804	Succeeded by George Cox Keʻeaumoku
