= Aliʻi nui of Hawaiʻi =

Supreme ruler of the Big Island, Hawaiʻi

The following is a list of Aliʻi nui of the island of Hawaiʻi.

The aliʻi nui is the supreme ruler (sometimes called the "King" or Moi) of the island. Aliʻi refers to the ruling class of Hawaiʻi prior to the formation of the Hawaiian Kingdom.

== Aliʻi nui of the Big Island ==
- Pilikaʻaiea, 1110–1130.
- Kukohou, 1130–1150
- Kaniuhu, 1150–1180
- Kanipahu, 1180–1210
- Kamaiʻole, usurper of Kanipahu, deposed by Kalapana, 1245–1250
- Kalapana of Hawaiʻi, 1250–1270
- Kahaʻimaoeleʻa, 1270–1300
- Kalaunuiohua, 1300–1345
- Kūʻaiwa, 1345–1375
- Kahoukapu, 1375–1405
- Kauholanuimahu, 1405–1435
- Kihanuilulumoku, 1435–1460
- Līloa, 1460–1480
- Hākau, 1480–1490

Unbroken line of rule to this point. Hakau, Liloa's first born and named heir, was overthrown by Liloa's second son Umi-a-Liloa; however, the hereditary line of Liloa is unbroken and continues.

- ʻUmi-a-Līloa, 1490–1525
- Keliʻiokaloa, 1525–1545
- Keawenui-a-ʻUmi, 1545–1575
- Kaikilani (female), 1575–1605
- Keakealani Kāne, 1605–1635
- Keakamāhana (female), 1635–1665
- Keākealaniwahine (female), 1665–1695
- Keaweʻīkekahialiʻiokamoku, 1695–1725, co-ruler with his half-sister wife Kalanikauleleiaiwi

Hereditary line of Liloa is broken by the usurping rule of Alapainui.

- Alapaʻinui, nephew of Keaweʻīkekahialiʻiokamoku and usurper of his son; 1725–1754.
- Keaweʻōpala

The usurping line of rule ends with Keaweʻopala who is killed in battle while his son and heir, Kalaimanokahoʻowaha, did survive to greet Captain James Cook. The hereditary line of Liloa resumes through the grandson of Keaweʻīkekahialiʻiokamoku, Kalaniʻōpuʻu.

- Kalaniʻōpuʻu
- Kīwalaʻō, April 1782-July 1782, Aliʻi of Kaʻū

Kalaniʻōpuʻu's line ends with the death of Kīwalaʻō by Kamehameha's forces.

- Kamehameha I

== See also ==
- Aliʻi Aimoku of Kauaʻi
- Aliʻi Aimoku of Molokaʻi
- Aliʻi Aimoku of Oʻahu
- Aliʻi Aimoku of Maui
- Royal Governors of Hawaii
- Ancient Hawaiʻi
- Kingdom of Hawaiʻi
