= Battle of Mokuʻōhai =

1782 battle during the unification of Hawaiʻi

- Part of the Unification of Hawaii
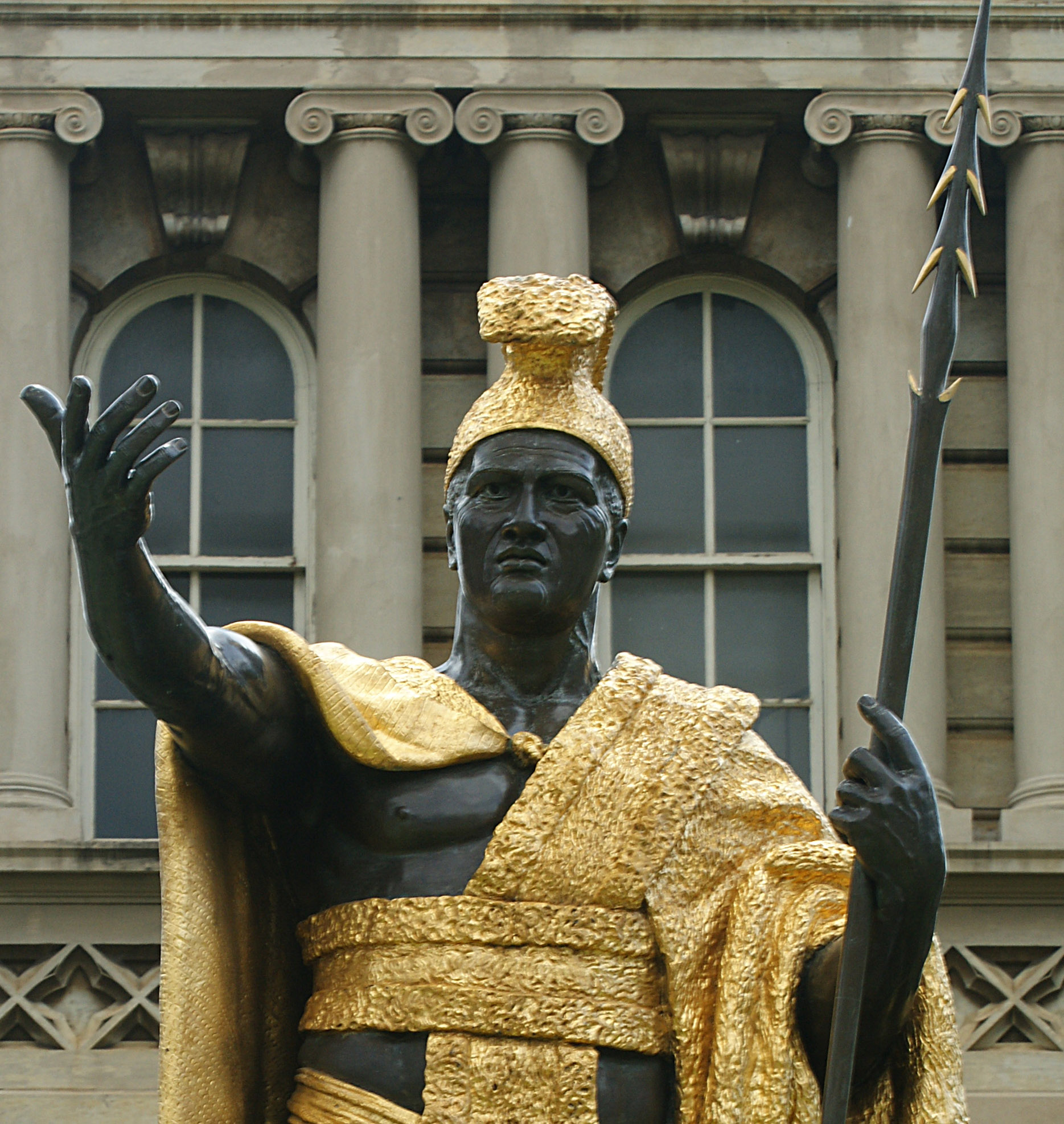
- King Kamehameha I, statue standing in front of Ali'iolani Hale in Honolulu
Date	July 1782
Location	Kona, Hawaiʻi Island
Result	Kamehameha I victory

Belligerents
Kamehameha I's army	Kīwalaʻō

Commanders and leaders
Kamehameha I Keʻeaumoku Pāpaʻiaheahe; Kameʻeiamoku; Kamanawa	Kīwalaʻō †; Keōua Kuahuʻula; Keawemauhili

Strength
≈1,000 – 3,000	Unknown

Casualties and losses
- ~4,000 – 8,000 for both combatants

The Battle of Mokuʻōhai, fought in 1782 on the island of Hawaiʻi, was a key battle in the early days of Kamehameha I's wars to conquer the Hawaiian Islands. It was his first major victory, solidifying his leadership over much of the island.

== Background ==
After Kalaniʻōpuʻu, the aliʻi nui of the island of Hawaiʻi, died in the spring of 1782, his family took his remains to the royal mausoleum Hale o Keawe (house of Keawe) at the important heiau called Puʻuhonua o Hōnaunau. While Kalaniʻōpuʻu's son Kīwalaʻō had inherited the kingdom, his nephew Kamehameha was given a religious position, as well as the district of Waipiʻo Valley. When a group of chiefs from the Kona district, including his brothers and uncles, Keaweaheulu, twins Kamanawa and Kameʻeiamoku, and Keʻeaumoku Pāpaʻiahiahi, offered to back Kamehameha instead of Kīwalaʻō, he accepted eagerly, traveling back from his residence in Kohala.

Kīwalaʻō's half-brother, Keōua Kūʻahuʻula, had been left with no territory by his late father. He went into a rage, cutting down sacred coconut trees belonging to Kamehameha (considered a great insult) and killing some of Kamehameha's men. Their bodies were offered as a sacrifice to Kīwalaʻō, who accepted them, and Kamehameha felt he had to respond to the challenge to his honor.

== Battle ==
The battleground was just to the south of Kealakekua Bay, near the present-day community called Keʻei., on the bay now called Mokuʻakae (which could be a misspelling of Mokuʻōhai), South of Palemano point. The name means "grove of ʻōhai trees". The tree, Sesbania tomentosa, is now endangered, and no longer grows in the area, so the site is only known from oral history.

As tensions were building, women and children from both sides flooded into the "place of refuge", Puʻuhonua o Hōnaunau. Kameʻeiamoku was the first leader injured, but when Kīwalaʻō approached, Kamanawa came to his aid. Then Kīwalaʻō was knocked down by a sling stone, and the injured Kameʻeiamoku was able to slit his throat with a shark-tooth dagger. It was during this battle that the renowned red feather cloak of Kīwalaʻō (now in the Bishop Museum) was captured by Kamehameha the Great.

== Aftermath ==
Keawemaʻuhili, Kīwalaʻō's uncle, was captured, but escaped to Hilo. Keōua Kūʻahuʻula fled to Kaʻū, where he had relatives. After the battle, Kamehameha controlled the northern and western parts of the island of Hawaiʻi, including Kona, Kohala, and Hāmākua, while Keawemaʻuhili controlled Hilo, and Kīwalaʻō's half-brother Keōua Kūʻahuʻula controlled Kaʻū. Kamehameha fought several more battles over many years to consolidate his control. In 1790, Keōua's party had their footprints frozen into volcanic ash, and in 1791 Kamehameha's forces finally killed Keōua at Puʻukoholā Heiau.
