= Kaikilani =

16th-century Hawaiian chiefess

Kaikilani (16th-century-17th-century), also known as Kaʻikilani nui aliʻiwahineʻo Puna, was a High Chiefess and Aliʻi Nui of Hawaiʻi island. She was a legendary figure in Hawaiian native oral tradition who dates to around the 16th century in the western calendar. Her father was Kukaʻilani and mother was Kaohukiokalani, both half-blood siblings of their father, Kealiʻiokaloa, ruling chief of Hawai'i Island.

She was married to Ali'i Lonoikamakahiki (not to be confused with the god Lono), son of Keawe-nui-a-‘Umi, and heir to the throne of Hawai'i island. The legends state that when the king died, Lono-i-ka-makihiki (or "Lono" for short) did not feel he was ready for the responsibility of kingship and declined to rule until he had mastered the martial skills. Kaikilani ruled as the first chiefess in Hawaiian history, and once Lono felt had shown his martial skills to the satisfaction of his subjects, he returned and took up the throne as co-ruler with Kaikilani. Together they ruled over the Hawaiian districts of Ka-'u and Puna.

A crater on the planet Venus has been named Kaikilani in her honor, see List of craters on Venus.

Preceded by Keawenuiaʻumi	Aliʻi Aimoku of Hawaiʻi Island c.1575–c.1605	Succeeded by Keakealani Kāne
