= Iwikauikaua =

Pre-contact Hawaiian high chief of Oʻahu

- Spouse: Keakamahana; Kauākahikuaʻanaʻauakāne
- Issue: Keakealaniwahine; Kāneikaiwilani
- Father: Makakaualiʻi
- Mother: Kapukāmola

Iwikauikaua was a Hawaiian high chief of Oʻahu.

== Family ==
He was a son of the chief Makakaualiʻi and chiefess Kapukāmola and grandson of Kūkaʻilani.

His wives included Hawaiian Queen Keakamahana. with whom he had a daughter, Queen Keakealaniwahine. With Kauākahikuaʻanaʻauakāne (w) he was the father of Kāneikaiwilani (k) who married his half sister Keakealaniwahine.

He was a grandfather of King Keaweʻīkekahialiʻiokamoku and Queen Kalanikauleleiaiwi.

His kapu was the burning kukui torch at midday, which his descendant Kalākaua used to symbolize his own dynasty.
