= Keākealanikāne =

- Aliʻi Aimoku of Hawaii
- Reign: c. 1605 – c. 1635
- Predecessor: Kaikilani
- Successor: Keakamahana
- Born: c. 1575
- Died: c. 1635 (aged 59–60); Hawaii
- Spouse: Aliʻi Kealiʻiokalani; Kaleimakaliʻi; Kaleiheana
- Father: Kanaloakuaʻana
- Mother: Kaikilani

Keākealanikāne (c. 1575 – c. 1635; Ke-ākea-lani Kāne 'the male heavenly expanse') was an aliʻi nui of the island of Hawaiʻi (c. 1605 – c. 1635). He was the sovereign of Hawaiʻi Island. He is mentioned in the Kumulipo creation chant.

During the reign of Keākealanikāne, several of the more powerful of the district chiefs had assumed an attitude of comparative independence.

== Life ==
Keākealanikāne was a son of Queen Kaikilani and Chief Kanaloakuaʻana. He succeeded on the death of his mother in 1605. He married first his sister, Aliʻi Kealiʻiokalani. His second wife was Kaleimakaliʻi and his third wife was Kalaʻaiheana (daughter of Kuaʻana-a-ʻI and Kamaka-o-ʻUmi). She was also a wife of Keawekuikaʻai.

He died around 1635, having had two sons and one daughter: Keawekuikaʻai by Kaleimakaliʻi, Moanakane by Kaleiheana and Keakamahana, Queen of Hawaiʻi by Kealiʻiokalani.

His granddaughter was Queen Keākealaniwahine.

Preceded by Kaikilani	Aliʻi Aimoku of Hawaiʻi c.1605–c.1635	Succeeded by Keakamahana
