= Kukailani =

Kūkaʻilani
- Prince of Hawaiʻi
- Spouse: Kaohukiokalani (half-sister)
- Issue: Queen Kaikilani; Makakaualii
- Father: Kealiiokaloa
- Religion: Hawaiian religion

Kūkaʻilani was a Hawaiian chief, a father of the Queen Kaikilani, aliʻi nui of Hawaiʻi. He was also a father of Makakaualiʻi.

== Family ==
He was a son of Kealiʻiokaloa and married Kaʻohukiokalani. The marriage between Kūkaʻilani and Kaʻohukiokalani was a half-brother/half-sister union.

Abraham Fornander wrote about him:

"There can be little doubt that Keawenui himself, as well as the public opinion of the chiefs and landholders of Hawaii, considered his occupancy of the dignity and position of Moi of Hawaii as an usurpation of the rights of his nephew, Kukailani, the son of Kealiiokaloa; and this was probably the cause of the commotion and uprising of the great district chiefs in the early part of Keawenui's."

His son Makakaualiʻi married Kapukāmola, daughter of Princess Kanakeawe, and had a son called Iwikauikaua.
