= Kalanikeʻeaumoku =

Keʻeaumoku Nui
- Prince of Hawaii
- Wives: Kamakaimoku; Kailakanoa
- Issue: Keōua; Kanekoa and Kahai
- Father: Keaweʻīkekahialiʻiokamoku
- Mother: Kalanikauleleiaiwi
- Religion: Hawaiian mythology

Kalanikeʻeaumoku was an aliʻi (noble) of Hawaii (island) of the Kona district and part of Kohala district and grandfather of Kamehameha I.

== Family ==
His mother was Kalanikauleleiaiwi and his father was Keaweʻīkekahialiʻiokamoku. He would noho (cohabitate) with Kamakaʻīmoku of the ʻI family of the Kaʻū district, the partner of his half brother Kalaninuiamamao and have a son named Keōua who would father Kamehameha I. With his half brother Kamakaimoku would father Kalaniʻōpuʻu, the half brother to Keōua becoming the progenitor for the House of Kamehameha and the House of Kalokuokamaile. His second wife was the High Chiefess Kailakanoa. His sons by Kailakanoa were Kanekoa and Kahai. Only his son Kanekoa's descendants survive from his second marriage; most notable of these are the House of Kawānanakoa, through her granddaughter Poʻomaikelani, the wife of Elelule Laʻakeaelelulu of Hilo, and mother of Kūhiō Kalanianaʻole.

He was descended from Aliʻi Nui ʻUmi-a-Liloa, connecting also to the chiefs of Maui, Oahu, Kauai. His name translates as the "Great Heavenly Island Climber".

His father was the ruler of the entire Big Island of Hawaiʻi. In addition to Kona, Keawe also gave him dominion over parts of the Kohala District, which was mostly controlled by the powerful and somewhat independent Mahi family. His brother Kalaninui`amamao became ruler of the Kaʻū district of the island.

After his father's death in 1725, he and his older brother, Kalaninuiamamao, engaged in warfare for the throne of the Island of Hawaiʻi. While the conflict ensued between the two brothers, Alapa`inui-a-kauaua was able to take advantage of the situation and usurped the throne. Alapa`inui was Keeʻaumoku's half-brother, sharing his mother, Queen Kalanikauleleiaiwi. They were also brothers of Ha'ae-a-Mahi, father of the Chiefess Kekuiapoiwa II, the mother of Kamehameha the Great. Because of the conflict between Keʻeaumoku and Kalaninuiamamao, the island remained divided into three to six separate territories until the unification by Aliʻi Nui Kamehameha I.
