= Keākealaniwahine =

Keākealani Wahine
- Aliʻi Aimoku of Hawaiʻi
- Reign: c. 1665 – c. 1695
- Predecessor: Keaka-mahana
- Successor: Keaweʻīkekahialiʻiokamoku
- Born: c. 1640
- Died: c. 1695
- Spouse: Kanaloaikaiwilewa; Kaneikauaiwilani
- Issue: Keaweʻīkekahialiʻiokamoku; Kalanikauleleiaiwi
- Father: Chief Iwikau-i-kaua of Oʻahu
- Mother: Queen Keakamahana of Hawaiʻi

Keākealaniwahine (c. 1640–c. 1695) was a High Chiefess and ruler Aliʻi Nui of Hawaiʻi island.

== Life ==
Her mother was Queen Keakamahana, monarch of Hawaiʻi. Her father (and mother's cousin) was Chief Iwikau-i-kaua of Oʻahu. She became ruler of the island on the death of her mother. She and her mother are association with the massive royal complex built at Holualoa Bay on the west side of the island.

Her reign was a troubled one. The house of ʻI had controlled the Hilo district since the days of their ancestor Prince Kumalae, the son of Umi-a-Liloa, had grown to such wealth and strength, and importance, as to be practically independent of even the very loose bonds with which the ruling district chiefs were held to their feudal obligations. The representative of this house of the district chief of Hilo at this time was Kuahuia, the son of Kua-ana-a-I, and grandson of ʻI. What led to the war, or what were its incidents, has not been preserved in the oral records, but it is frequently alluded to as a long and bitter strife between Kuahuia and Keakealaniwahine; and though tradition is equally silent as to its conclusion, it may be inferred that the royal authority was unable to subdue its powerful vassal. Mahiolole, the powerful district chief of Kohala was the chief counselor and supporter of Keakealani.

She was married two times, first to her cousin, Chief Kanaloaikaiwilewa, or as he is called in some genealogies, Chief Kanaloa-i-Kaiwilena Kapulehu, son of Chief ʻUmi-nui-kukailani, by his wife, Chiefess Kalani-o-Umi, daughter of Kaikilani, 17th Aliʻi Aimoku of Hawaii. She married second her half-brother, Chief Kane-i-Kauaiwilani, son of her father, Chief Iwikauikaua, of Oahu, by his second wife, Kauakahi Kuaʻanaʻau-a-kane.

She had a son Keaweʻīkekahialiʻiokamoku by Kanaloa-i-Kaiwilena Kapulehu, who would succeed her as the 21st king of Hawaii. She died about 1695, having had two sons and two daughters. One of them was Queen Kalanikauleleiaiwi.

She was the great-great-grandmother of Kamehameha I through five different relationships.

Preceded by Keakamahana	Aliʻi Aimoku of Hawaiʻi island c.1665-c.1695	Succeeded by Keaweʻīkekahialiʻiokamoku
