= Keakamāhana =

- Aliʻi Aimoku of Hawaiʻi
- Reign: c. 1635 – c. 1665
- Predecessor: Keakealanikane
- Successor: Keakealaniwahine
- Born: c. 1610
- Died: c. 1665
- Spouse: Iwikauikaua
- Issue: Queen Keakealaniwahine
- Father: Keakealanikane
- Mother: Kealiʻiokalani

Keakamāhana (c. 1610 – c. 1665) was an aliʻi nui of Hawaiʻi Island from c. 1635 to c. 1665. She ruled as sovereign of the island from the royal complex at Hōlualoa Bay.

== Life ==
She was the eldest daughter of the King Keakealanikane, the former aliʻi nui of Hawaiʻi. Her mother was Kealiʻiokalani, daughter of Queen Kaikilaniali`iwahineopuna and sister of Keakealanikane. Keakamāhana was an Aliʻi Piʻo, as her mother and father were full blood siblings. She succeeded on the death of her father around 1635. She married her cousin Aliʻi Iwikauikaua, son of Aliʻi Makakaualiʻi, by his wife Kapukāmola. She died in 1665, and her daughter Keakealaniwahine succeed her.

Preceded by Keakealani Kāne	Aliʻi Aimoku of Hawaiʻi Island c.1635–c.1665	Succeeded by Keakealaniwahine
