= Kaʻiminaʻauao =

Hawaiian princess (1845–1848)

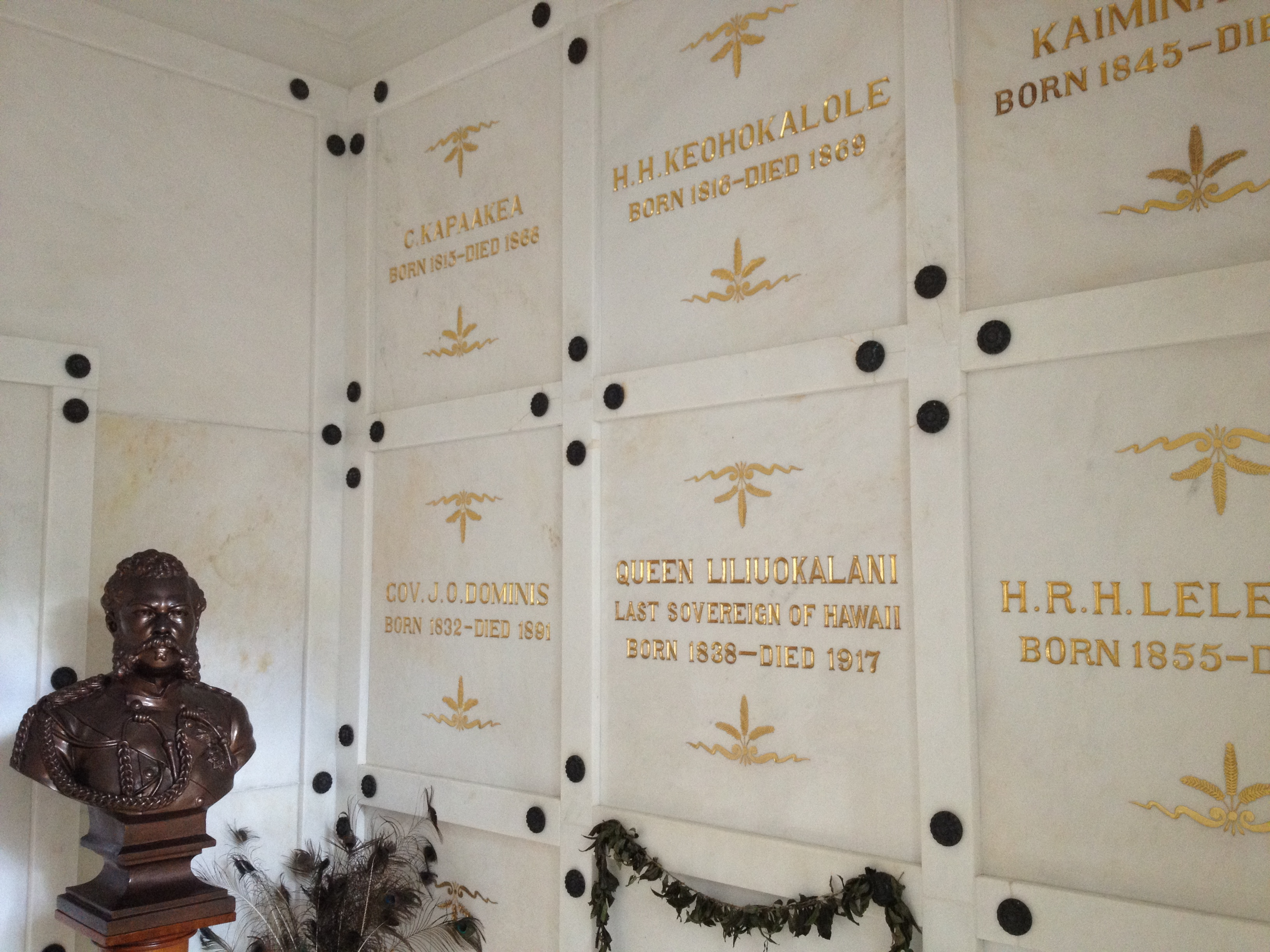
- Burial site of Kaʻiminaʻauao, Kalakaua Crypt, Mauna ʻAla Royal Mausoleum
- Born: November 7, 1845
- Died: November 10, 1848 (aged 3); Honolulu, Kingdom of Hawaiʻi
- Burial: Mauna ʻAla Royal Mausoleum
- House: Kalākaua
- Father: Caesar Kapaʻakea
- Mother: Analea Keohokālole

Kaʻiminaʻauao (November 7, 1845 – November 10, 1848) was a Hawaiian high chiefess who was given in adoption to Queen Kalama and King Kamehameha III. She died of the measles at the age of three, during an epidemic of measles, whooping cough and influenza that killed more than 10,000 Native Hawaiians. Her elder brother and sister became King Kalākaua (who reigned from 1874 to 1891), and Queen Liliʻuokalani (who reigned as Hawaii's last monarch from 1891 to 1893).

== Name ==
Her name has been traditionally spelled Kaiminaauao or Kaʻiminaʻauao with the two ʻokina, which are phonemic glottal stops, as it is used in many Polynesian languages. It is alternatively spelled as Kaiminiaauao. Her name means "the search for knowledge" in the Hawaiian language. According to Hawaiian linguist Mary Kawena Pukui, ʻimi naʻau ao means "to seek knowledge or education; ambitious to learn; one seeking education or learning, research, learning".

== Family ==
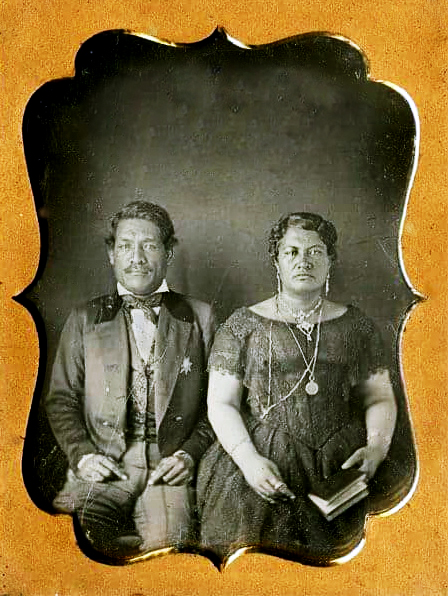
King Kamehameha III and Queen Kalama, c. 1850

Kaʻiminaʻauao was born on November 7, 1845. Born into the aliʻi class of Hawaiian nobility, her father High Chief Caesar Kapaʻakea and mother High Chiefess Analea Keohokālole were advisors to the reigning king Kamehameha III. Her mother was the daughter of ʻAikanaka and Kamaʻeokalani, while her father was the son of Kamanawa II (half-brother of ʻAikanaka) and Kamokuiki. From her parents, she descended from Keaweaheulu and Kameʻeiamoku, the royal counselors of Kamehameha I during his conquest of the Kingdom of Hawaii. Kameʻeiamoku, the grandfather of both her mother and father, was one of the royal twins alongside Kamanawa depicted on the Hawaiian coat of arms. Kaʻiminaʻauao's family were collateral relations of the House of Kamehameha. Another relative of the family was the High Chiefess Kapiʻolani who plucked the sacred ʻōhelo berries and openly defied the goddess Pele as a dramatic demonstration of her new faith in Christianity.

The fifth child and third daughter of a large family, her sibling included James Kaliokalani, David Kalākaua (who reigned as king from 1874 to 1891), Lydia Kamakaʻeha (who reigned as Hawaii's last monarch, Queen Liliʻuokalani from 1891 to 1893), Anna Kaʻiulani, Miriam Likelike, and William Pitt Leleiohoku II. All her siblings were given away in hānai to other family members and friends. The Hawaiian custom of hānai is an informal form of adoption between extended families practiced by Hawaiian royals and commoners alike. She was adopted by Queen Kalama, the wife of King Kamehameha III. The royal couple were childless at the time because two sons born to Kalama (both named Keaweaweʻulaokalani) had died during infancy. Kamehameha III had previously adopted his half-sister Kīnaʻu's son Alexander Liholiho (the future Kamehameha IV) as his heir and successor. Contemporary English sources referred to Kaʻiminaʻauao as the ward of the queen.

== Death and funeral ==
The measles epidemic of 1848-49 was brought to Hilo by an American warship. During this short period, a combination of measles and whooping cough and influenza epidemics killed 10,000 people, mostly Native Hawaiians. Among the high chiefs who died were Moses Kekūāiwa (son of Kīnaʻu and Kekūanaōʻa), William Pitt Leleiohoku I (husband of Ruth Keʻelikōlani) and the three-year-old Kaʻiminaʻauao, who died on November 10, 1848. The bodies of the deceased were embalmed with alcohol in lead coffins and placed inside wooden coffins.

Initially buried in the Pohukaina Tomb, located on grounds of ʻIolani Palace, her remains were left behind when the coffins of other royals were moved to the newly constructed Royal Mausoleum at Mauna ʻAla in the Nuʻuanu Valley in 1865. This changed after the accession of her brother as king. On the evening of November 30, 1875, her remains and the remains of her parents, buried at the cemetery of Kawaiahaʻo Church, were transported to the Royal Mausoleum followed by torchlight under a military escort led by John Owen Dominis. In a ceremony officiated by her sister Liliʻuokalani on June 24, 1910, her remains, and those of her family, were transferred for a final time to the underground Kalākaua Crypt after the main mausoleum building had been converted into a chapel.

Kaʻiminaʻauao's three elder siblings were educated at the Chiefs' Children's School (later renamed the Royal School), founded in 1839 by the American missionary couple Amos Starr Cooke and Juliette Montague Cooke to provide a Western-style education to the Hawaiian royal children. The children at the school were chosen by Kamehameha III to be eligible for the throne of the Kingdom of Hawaii. It was intended that Kaʻiminaʻauao would join the school. However, her early death and the death of other aliʻi children including two daughters of Jonah Piʻikoi in the epidemic prevented the addition of new scholars to the school. This deficit of scholars would lead to the closure of the school in 1850. Juliette Montague Cooke wrote: "A little girl, sister of three of our scholars, adopted by the Queen, and who was expecting to enter our family, died on 10th inst. aged three years and two days."

== Ancestry ==
Kalākaua family tree

Key- (k)= Kane (male/husband)
(w)= wahine (female/wife)
Subjects with bold titles, lavender highlighted, bold box= Direct bloodline
Bold title, bold, grey box= Aunts, uncles, cousins line
Bold title, bold white box= European or American (raised to aliʻi status by marriage or monarch's decree)
Regular name and box= makaʻāinana or untitled foreign subject

Kāneikaiwilani (k)
Lonoikahaupu (k)
Keawepoepoe (k)
Kameʻeiamoku (k)
Kepoʻokalani (k)
Kamanawa II (k)
Kapaʻakea (1815–1866)
Kaliokalani (1835–1852)

Kanalohanaui (k)	Keākealani (w)	Ahu-a-ʻI (k)	Piʻilani (w) II	Moana (k)
Kalanikauleleiaiwi (w)	Kauauaʻamahi (k)	Keawe II (k)	Lonomaʻaikanaka (w)	Kauhiahaki (k)	ʻIliki-ā-Moana (w)
Kanoena (w)	Haʻaeamahi (k)	Kekelakekeokalani (w)	Alapaʻi Nui (k)	Keaka (w)	Keeaumoku Nui (k)	Kamakaimoku (w)	Kaeamamao (k) (Note: Genealogy of Liliuokalani, page 400, appendix B, No. 2 Queen of Hawaii, Liliuokalani (1898). Hawaii's Story by Hawaii's Queen. University of Hawaii Press. p. 400. "Kapaakea genealogy.")	Kaolanialiʻi (w)
Kamakaʻeheikuli (w)	Keōua (k)	Kahekili II (k)	Kekuiapoiwa II (w)	Ikuaʻana (w)	Heulu (k)	Moana (w)	Keaweʻopala (k)	Nohomualani (k)
Keaweaheulu (k)	Ululani (w)	Hakau (w)	Kanaʻina (k)	Kauwa (w)	Eia (k)
Alapai (w)	Keohohiwa (w)	Keōpūolani (w)	Kamehameha I	Kalaniʻōpuʻu (k)	Kānekapōlei (w)	Kiʻilaweau (k)	Nāhiʻōleʻa (k)	Kahoʻowaha II (w)	Inaina (w)
Hao (K)	Kailipakalua (w)
Kamokuiki (w)	ʻAikanaka (k)	Kamaeokalani (w)	Kaōleiokū (k)	Keoua (w)	Luahine (w)	Kalaʻimamahu	Kaheiheimālie
Kamehameha II	Kamehameha III	Kekūanaōʻa (k)	Kahalaiʻa; Luanuʻu (k)	Pauahi (w)	Kīnaʻu (w)	Pākī (k)	Kōnia (w)	Kanaʻina II	Kaʻahumanu III
Keohokālole (1816–1869)	Keʻelikōlani (w)	Kamehameha IV	Kamehameha V	Kaʻahumanu IV	Pauahi Bishop (w)	Bishop (k)	Lunalilo (k)
Kalākaua (1836–1891)	Kapiʻolani (1834–1899)	Liliʻuokalani (1838–1917)	Dominis (1832–1891)	Kaʻiulani (1842–?)	Kaʻiminaʻauao (1845–1848)	Cleghorn (1835–1910)	Likelike (1851–1887)	Leleiohoku II (1854–1877)
Kaʻiulani (1875–1899)

Notes:

Ancestors of Kaʻiminaʻauao

16. High Chief Kameʻeiamoku
8. High Chief Kepoʻokalani
17. High Chiefess Kamakaʻeheikuli
4. High Chief Kamanawa II
18. High Chief Kalaninuiamamao of Kaʻū
9. High Chiefess Alapaʻiwahine
19. High Chiefess Kaolanialiʻi
2. High Chief Caesar Kapaʻakea
20. High Chief Kaʻihelemoana
10. High Chief Kanepawale
21. High Chiefess Kaʻopa
5. High Chiefess Kamokuiki
22. High Chief Kaʻehunuiamamaliʻi
11. High Chiefess Uaua
23. High Chiefess Koʻi
1. Kaʻiminaʻauao
24. High Chief Kameʻeiamoku (= 16)
12. High Chief Kepoʻokalani (= 8)
25. High Chiefess Kamakaʻeheikuli (= 17)
6. High Chief ʻAikanaka
26. High Chief Keaweaheulu of Waiʻanae
13. High Chiefess Keohohiwa
27. High Chiefess ʻUlulani of Hilo
3. High Chiefess Analea Keohokālole
28. High Chief Makakaualiʻi
14. High Chief Kahoalani Eia
29. High Chiefess Kapalaoa
7. High Chiefess Kamaʻeokalani
30. High Chief Ahaula
15. High Chiefess Keakaula
31. High Chiefess Kawehe

== Bibliography ==
- Allen, Helena G. (1982). The Betrayal of Liliuokalani: Last Queen of Hawaii, 1838–1917. Glendale, CA: Arthur H. Clark Company. ISBN 978-0-87062-144-4. OCLC 9576325.
- Cooke, Amos Starr; Cooke, Juliette Montague (1937). Richards, Mary Atherton (ed.). The Chiefs' Children School: A Record Compiled from the Diary and Letters of Amos Starr Cooke and Juliette Montague Cooke, by Their Granddaughter Mary Atherton Richards. Honolulu: Honolulu Star-Bulletin. OCLC 1972890.
- Haley, James L. (2014). Captive Paradise: A History of Hawaii. New York: St. Martin's Press. ISBN 978-0-312-60065-5. OCLC 865158092.
- Kam, Ralph Thomas (2017). Death Rites and Hawaiian Royalty: Funerary Practices in the Kamehameha and Kalakaua Dynasties, 1819–1953. S. I.: McFarland, Incorporated, Publishers. ISBN 978-1-4766-6846-8. OCLC 966566652.
- Kamakau, Samuel (1992) [1961]. Ruling Chiefs of Hawaii (Revised ed.). Honolulu: Kamehameha Schools Press. ISBN 0-87336-014-1. OCLC 25008795.
- Kanahele, George S. (1999). Emma: Hawaii's Remarkable Queen. Honolulu: University of Hawaii Press. ISBN 978-0-8248-2240-8. OCLC 40890919.
- King, Samuel P.; Roth, Randall W. (2006). Broken Trust: Greed, Mismanagement & Political Manipulation at America's Largest Charitable Trust (PDF). Honolulu: University of Hawaii Press. pp. 14, 21–22, 35, 78, 139. hdl:10125/48548. ISBN 978-0-8248-3014-4. OCLC 62326686.
- Kuykendall, Ralph Simpson (1965) [1938]. The Hawaiian Kingdom 1778–1854, Foundation and Transformation. Vol. 1. Honolulu: University of Hawaii Press. ISBN 0-87022-431-X. OCLC 47008868.
- Liliuokalani (1898). Hawaii's Story by Hawaii's Queen, Liliuokalani. Boston: Lee and Shepard. ISBN 978-0-548-22265-2. OCLC 2387226.
- Parker, David "Kawika" (2008). "Crypts of the Ali`i The Last Refuge of the Hawaiian Royalty". Tales of Our Hawaiʻi (PDF). Honolulu: Alu Like, Inc. OCLC 309392477. Archived from the original (PDF) on November 11, 2013.
- Peterson, Barbara Bennett (1984). Notable Women of Hawaii. Honolulu: University of Hawaii Press. ISBN 978-0-8248-0820-4. OCLC 11030010.
- Pratt, Elizabeth Kekaaniauokalani Kalaninuiohilaukapu (1920). History of Keoua Kalanikupuapa-i-nui: Father of Hawaii Kings, and His Descendants, with Notes on Kamehameha I, First King of All Hawaii. Honolulu: Honolulu Star-Bulletin. OCLC 154181545.
- Pukui, Mary Kawena; Elbert, Samuel H. (1986). Hawaiian Dictionary: Hawaiian-English, English-Hawaiian. Honolulu: University of Hawaii Press. ISBN 978-0-8248-0703-0. OCLC 12751521.
- Reese, Albert Moore (1919). Wanderings in the Orient. Chicago, London: Open Court Publishing Company. OCLC 556316189.
- Schmitt, Robert C.; Nordyke, Eleanor C. (2001). "Death in Hawai'i: The Epidemics of 1848–1849". Hawaiian Journal of History. 35. Honolulu: Hawaiian Historical Society: 1–13. hdl:10524/339. OCLC 60626541.
- Thrum, Thomas G., ed. (1909). "New Kalakaua Dynasty Tomb". All About Hawaii: The Recognized Book of Authentic Information on Hawaii. Vol. 36. Honolulu: Honolulu Star-Bulletin. pp. 105–110.
- Van Dyke, Jon M. (2008). Who Owns the Crown Lands of Hawaiʻi?. Honolulu: University of Hawaii Press. ISBN 978-0-8248-3211-7. OCLC 163812857.
