= James Kaliokalani =

Hawaiian prince (1835–1852)

- Born: May 29, 1835; Honolulu, Oahu (possibly)
- Died: April 2/April 21, 1852 (aged 16); Lahaina, Maui
- Burial: May 6, 1852; Unknown site in Honolulu
- House: Kalākaua
- Father: Caesar Kapaʻakea
- Mother: Analea Keohokālole

James Kaliokalani, also referred to as Kali; (May 29, 1835 – April 2/21, 1852) was a Hawaiian high chief of the Kingdom of Hawaii. At a young age, he was chosen to attend the Chiefs' Children's School (later renamed Royal School). He was taught by the American missionary Amos Starr Cooke and his wife, Juliette Montague Cooke, alongside his siblings and thirteen of their royal cousins, who were declared eligible to succeed to the Hawaiian throne. He died in 1852, shortly after leaving the school and working as a court interpreter.

== Early life and family ==
James Kaliokalani was born on May 29, 1835. His father High Chief Caesar Kapaʻakea and mother High Chiefess Analea Keohokālole were advisors to the reigning king Kamehameha III. His mother was the daughter of ʻAikanaka and Kamaʻeokalani while his father was the son of Kamanawa II (half-brother of ʻAikanaka) and Kamokuiki. From his parents, he descended from Keaweaheulu and Kameʻeiamoku, the royal counselors of Kamehameha I during his conquest of the Kingdom of Hawaii. Kameʻeiamoku, the grandfather of both his mother and father, was one of the royal twins alongside Kamanawa depicted on the Hawaiian coat of arms. Kaliokalani's family were collateral relations of the House of Kamehameha. Another relative of the family was the High Chiefess Kapiʻolani who plucked the ʻōhelo berries and openly defied the goddess Pele as a dramatic demonstration of her new faith in Christianity.

He was the older surviving brother of David Kalākaua, Lydia Kamakaʻeha (Liliʻuokalani), Anna Kaʻiulani, Kaʻiminaʻauao, Miriam Likelike, and William Pitt Leleiohoku II. All his siblings were given away in hānai to other family members and friends. The Hawaiian custom of hānai is an informal form of adoption between extended families practiced by Hawaiian royals and commoners alike. Kaliokalani was adopted under the Hawaiian tradition of hānai by his maternal grandfather ʻAikanaka, who was in command of the Punchbowl Battery, an artillery unit on a fort situated on Punchbowl Hill in Honolulu. He died around 1837. After ʻAikanaka's death, Kaiahua hānai (adopted) Kaliokalani. She was the widow of ʻAikanaka, whom the Cookes called "Alika Kuaiohua" and referred to as Kali's "step-mother".

== Education at Royal School ==
From the age of four, Kaliokalani attended the Chiefs' Children's School (later renamed Royal School) founded in 1839 to provide a Western-style education to the Hawaiian royal children. He entered the school around July 1839 (temporarily) and later in May 1840 (as a more steady boarding student) with Alexander Liholiho, the king's adopted son and heir-apparent who later reigned as King Kamehameha IV. His classmates included his siblings David Kalākaua and Lydia Kamakaʻeha and thirteen other royal cousins. Along with his other classmates, he was chosen by Kamehameha III to be eligible for the throne of the Kingdom of Hawaii. The boarding school was taught by the American missionary couple Amos Starr Cooke and Juliette Montague Cooke while John Papa ʻĪʻī and his wife Sarai Hiwauli, who were only originally the kahu (caretaker) of Princess Victoria Kamāmalu, were appointed by the King as kahu to the royal children.

Referred to as Kali by his teachers, he was taught in English by the Cookes alongside his royal cousins. They were taught reading, spelling, penmanship, arithmetic, geometry, algebra, physics, geography, history, bookkeeping, singing and English composition by the missionary couple. In the classroom students were divided by their age and length of time at the school. Kaliokalani was a member of the second level class with Emma Rooke, Peter Kaʻeo and his brother David Kalākaua. Kali was less robust than his younger brother Kalākaua who defended him when the older and stronger boys bullied him at the school. During their Sunday procession to church it was customary for boys and girls to walk side by side, Kali would walk beside his cousin Elizabeth Kekaʻaniau. The Cookes enforced a strict moral code on the children especially on their sexual misconduct and punished them severely for any infractions. Around the time he was ten, Kali was found in the room of Emma Rooke and severely punished by Amos Starr Cooke for suspected indecency. Emma was not punished because Elizabeth Kekaʻaniau may possibly have been with Emma and others in the room at the time. Emma was nine years old at the time, and she would one day marry Alexander Liholiho, i. e. King Kamehameha IV.

After enrolling Kaliokalani as a permanent student, his step-grandmother and hānai mother Kaiahua removed him from the school. She was initially supportive of his enrollment. But after learning that he was being asked to do chores such as watering the plants in the school yard which she considered servant's work, Kaiahua detained him at her home when he and the other children visited her home during a school outing, on November 7, 1841. In order to bring Kaliokalani back to school, kahu John Papa ʻĪʻī openly confronted the high chiefess, stepped on her lap and seized the boy from her hands. ʻĪʻī told the chiefess: "Not only is it asked of your moʻopuna [grandson] but of all the boys, of me, and of their teachers. This strengthens the body like all other kinds of exercise, to the benefit of the child. You have no right in this matter, as the children are placed in my care by the king, and only the personal needs of the child are your affair." In October 1840, their paternal grandfather Kamanawa II requested his grandsons to visit him on the night before his execution for the murder of his wife Kamokuiki. The next morning the Cookes allowed ʻĪʻī to bring Kaliokalani and his brother Kalākaua to see Kamanawa for the last time. It is not known if their sister was also taken to see him. Later sources, especially in biographies of Kalākaua indicated that the boys witnessed the hanging of their grandfather at the gallows. Historian Helena G. Allen noted the indifference the Cookes' had toward the request and the traumatic experience it must have been for the boys.

== Death and memorial ==
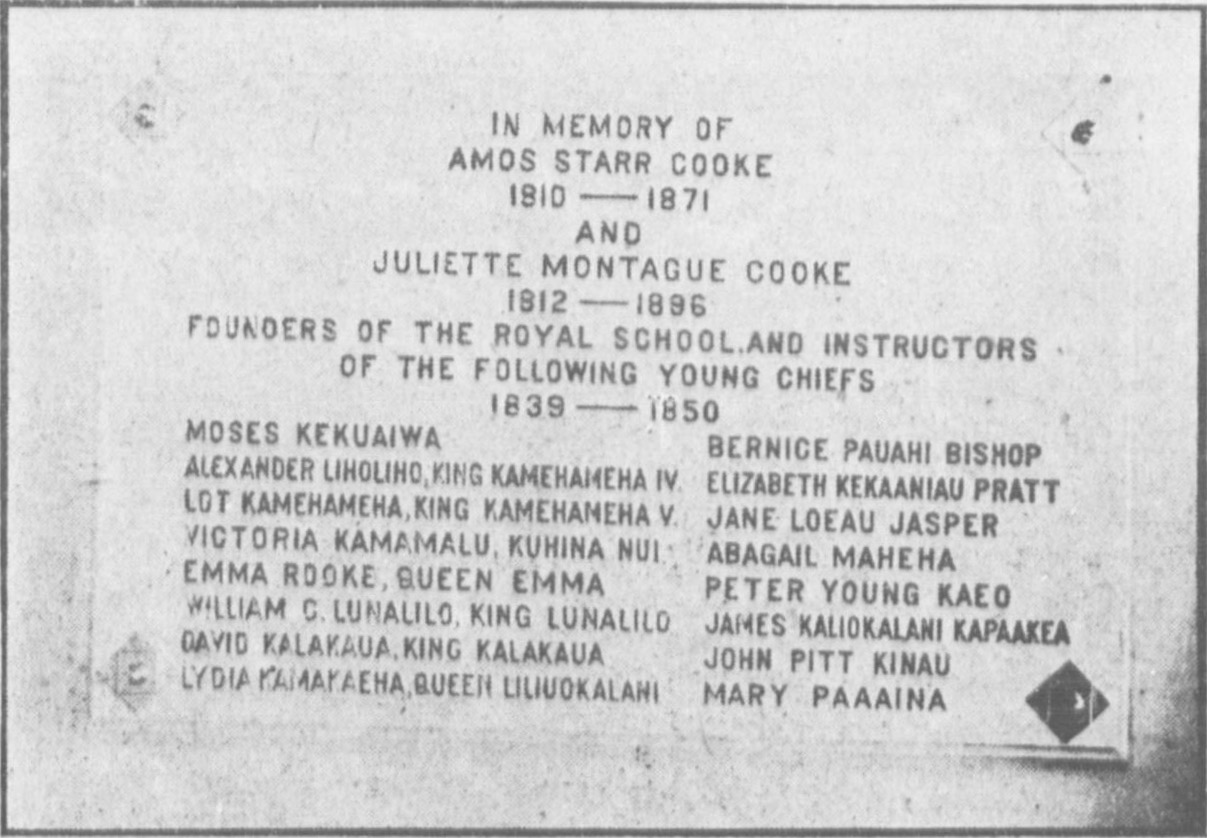
The Cooke Memorial Tablet at Kawaiahaʻo Church commemorating the sixteen royal children and their teachers

The Royal School declined between 1848 and 1850 after the Cooke family decided to leave and most of the students left school, married or continued their educations elsewhere. Not long after, Kaliokalani left school. Little is known about his life during the intervening years. He died at Lahaina in 1852, aged sixteen. Contemporary news coverage of his death and funeral were scant. The contemporary English language newspaper The Polynesian stated that he died on April 21 while Lorrin Andrews's A Chronological Table of Remarkable Events Connected with the History of the Hawaiian Islands stated that Kaliokalani died on April 2. A cause of death was not noted. His remains were brought back to Honolulu for burial on May 4 and his funeral was held on May 6 at 4:00pm. The Privy Council of State declared a fourteen-day mourning period following the funeral. The exact site of burial is not specified. He is not buried at the Royal Mausoleum at Mauna ʻAla in the Nuʻuanu Valley with his siblings and parents.

Prior to his death, Kaliokalani seemed to have been working as an interpreter in the Police Court with Charles Coffin Harris, a New England lawyer who later became a leading politician in the Kingdom. During his world tour in 1881 and upon learning of Harris's death, Kalākaua, who had also received his first instruction in law under Harris, wrote to their sister Liliʻuokalani reminiscing about their elder brother and his work as an interpreter: "I feel it [the news of Harris' death] the more when I recall the days of my childhood and that of our brother James Kaliokalani, who was our first instructor in Law and remained with him as assistant interpreter of the Police Court for two years". His younger siblings Kalākaua and Liliʻuokalani became the final two monarchs of the Kingdom of Hawaii.

On March 17, 1912, the Cooke Memorial Tablet was dedicated at Kawaiahaʻo Church commemorating the sixteen royal children of the original Royal School and their teachers on the one hundredth anniversary of the birth of Juliette Montague Cooke. The ceremony was officiated by Kaliokalani's sister Liliʻuokalani and his Sunday procession partner Elizabeth Kekaʻaniau, the last surviving members of the Royal School. On the memorial, his name was written as "James Kaliokalani Kapaakea".

== Ancestry ==
Kalākaua family tree

Key- (k)= Kane (male/husband)
(w)= wahine (female/wife)
Subjects with bold titles, lavender highlighted, bold box= Direct bloodline
Bold title, bold, grey box= Aunts, uncles, cousins line
Bold title, bold white box= European or American (raised to aliʻi status by marriage or monarch's decree)
Regular name and box= makaʻāinana or untitled foreign subject

Kāneikaiwilani (k)
Lonoikahaupu (k)
Keawepoepoe (k)
Kameʻeiamoku (k)
Kepoʻokalani (k)
Kamanawa II (k)
Kapaʻakea (1815–1866)
Kaliokalani (1835–1852)

Kanalohanaui (k) | Keākealani (w) | Ahu-a-ʻI (k) | Piʻilani (w) II | Moana (k)
Kalanikauleleiaiwi (w) | Kauauaʻamahi (k) | Keawe II (k) | Lonomaʻaikanaka (w) | Kauhiahaki (k) | ʻIliki-ā-Moana (w)
Kanoena (w) | Haʻaeamahi (k) | Kekelakekeokalani (w) | Alapaʻi Nui (k) | Keaka (w) | Keeaumoku Nui (k) | Kamakaimoku (w) | Kaeamamao (k) (Note: Genealogy of Liliuokalani, page 400, appendix B, No. 2 Queen of Hawaii, Liliuokalani (1898). Hawaii's Story by Hawaii's Queen. University of Hawaii Press. p. 400. "Kapaakea genealogy.") | Kaolanialiʻi (w)
Kamakaʻeheikuli (w) | Keōua (k) | Kahekili II (k) | Kekuiapoiwa II (w) | Ikuaʻana (w) | Heulu (k) | Moana (w) | Keaweʻopala (k) | Nohomualani (k)
Keaweaheulu (k) | Ululani (w) | Hakau (w) | Kanaʻina (k) | Kauwa (w) | Eia (k)
Alapai (w) | Keohohiwa (w) | Keōpūolani (w) | Kamehameha I | Kalaniʻōpuʻu (k) | Kānekapōlei (w) | Kiʻilaweau (k) | Nāhiʻōleʻa (k) | Kahoʻowaha II (w) | Inaina (w)
Hao (K) | Kailipakalua (w)
Kamokuiki (w) | ʻAikanaka (k) | Kamaeokalani (w) | Kaōleiokū (k) | Keoua (w) | Luahine (w) | Kalaʻimamahu | Kaheiheimālie
Kamehameha II | Kamehameha III | Kekūanaōʻa (k) | Kahalaiʻa; Luanuʻu (k) | Pauahi (w) | Kīnaʻu (w) | Pākī (k) | Kōnia (w) | Kanaʻina II | Kaʻahumanu III
Keohokālole (1816–1869) | Keʻelikōlani (w) | Kamehameha IV | Kamehameha V | Kaʻahumanu IV | Pauahi Bishop (w) | Bishop (k) | Lunalilo (k)
Kalākaua (1836–1891) | Kapiʻolani (1834–1899) | Liliʻuokalani (1838–1917) | Dominis (1832–1891) | Kaʻiulani (1842–?) | Kaʻiminaʻauao (1845–1848) | Cleghorn (1835–1910) | Likelike (1851–1887) | Leleiohoku II (1854–1877)
Kaʻiulani (1875–1899)

== Bibliography ==
- Allen, Helena G. (1982). The Betrayal of Liliuokalani: Last Queen of Hawaii, 1838–1917. Glendale, CA: A. H. Clark Company. ISBN 978-0-87062-144-4. OCLC 9576325.
- Allen, Helena G. (1995). Kalakaua: Renaissance King. Honolulu: Mutual Publishing. ISBN 978-1-56647-059-9. OCLC 35083815.
- Andrews, Lorrin (1865). "A Chronological Table of Remarkable Events Connected with the History of the Hawaiian Islands". A Dictionary of the Hawaiian Language. Honolulu: H. M. Whitney. pp. 555–559. OCLC 1812303.
- Biographical Sketch of His Majesty King Kalakaua. Honolulu: P. C. Advertiser Steam Printing Office. 1884. pp. 72–74. OCLC 12787107.
- Cooke, Amos Starr; Cooke, Juliette Montague (1937). Richards, Mary Atherton (ed.). The Chiefs' Children School: A Record Compiled from the Diary and Letters of Amos Starr Cooke and Juliette Montague Cooke, by Their Granddaughter Mary Atherton Richards. Honolulu: Honolulu Star-Bulletin. OCLC 1972890.
- Kalakaua (1971). Greer, Richard A. (ed.). "The Royal Tourist—Kalakaua's Letters Home from Tokio to London". The Hawaiian Journal of History. 5. Honolulu: Hawaiian Historical Society: 75–109. hdl:10524/186. OCLC 60626541.
- Gutmanis, June (1974). "Law ... Shall Punish All Men Who Commit Crime". The Hawaiian Journal of History. 8. Honolulu: Hawaiian Historical Society: 143–145. hdl:10524/526. OCLC 60626541.
- Haley, James L. (2014). Captive Paradise: A History of Hawaii. New York: St. Martin's Press. ISBN 978-0-312-60065-5.
- Ii, John Papa; Pukui, Mary Kawena; Barrère, Dorothy B. (1983). Fragments of Hawaiian History (2 ed.). Honolulu: Bishop Museum Press. ISBN 978-0-910240-31-4. OCLC 251324264.
- Kam, Ralph Thomas (2017). Death Rites and Hawaiian Royalty: Funerary Practices in the Kamehameha and Kalakaua Dynasties, 1819–1953. S. I.: McFarland, Incorporated, Publishers. ISBN 978-1-4766-6846-8. OCLC 966566652.
- Kanahele, George S. (1999). Emma: Hawaii's Remarkable Queen. Honolulu: University of Hawaii Press. ISBN 978-0-8248-2240-8. OCLC 40890919.
- Liliuokalani (1898). Hawaii's Story by Hawaii's Queen, Liliuokalani. Boston: Lee and Shepard. ISBN 978-0-548-22265-2. OCLC 2387226.
- Van Dyke, Jon M. (2008). Who Owns the Crown Lands of Hawaiʻi?. Honolulu: University of Hawaii Press. ISBN 978-0-8248-3211-7. OCLC 163812857.
