= Keohokālole =

Hawaiian chiefess (1816–1869)

Analea Keohokālole
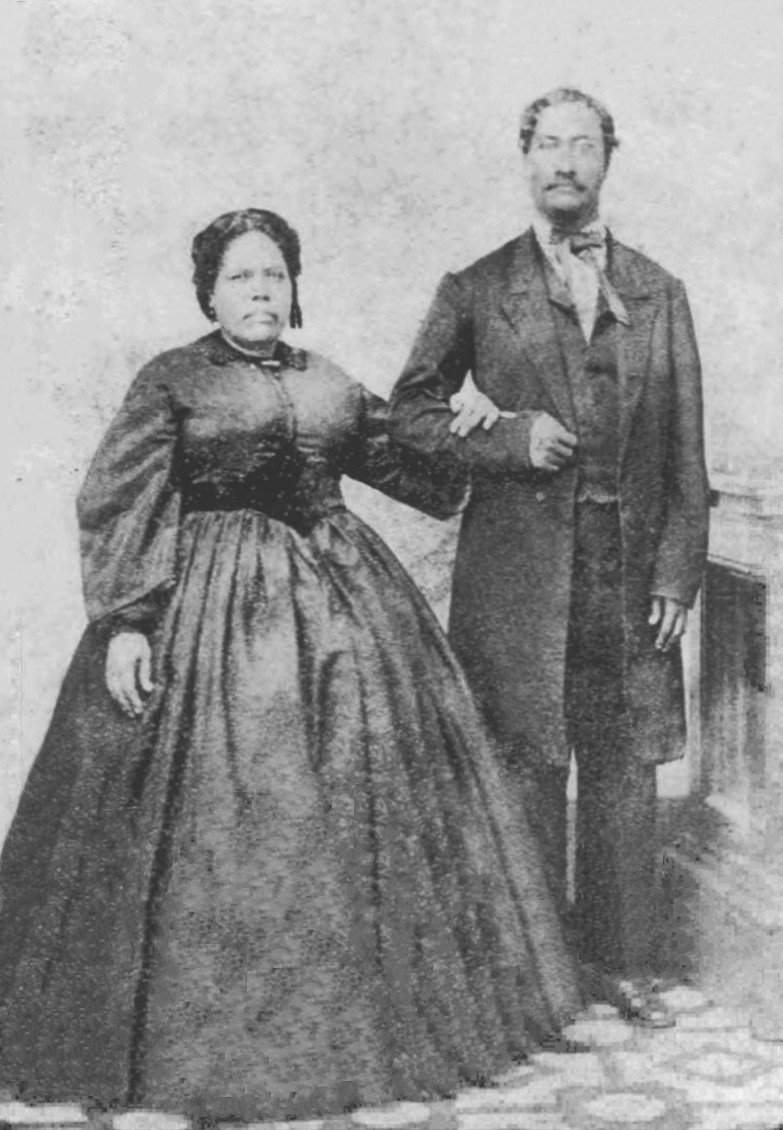
- Born: c. 1816; Kailua, Kona, Hawaii Island
- Died: April 6, 1869; Hilo, Hawaii Island
- Burial: April 18, 1869; Kawaiahaʻo Church Cemetery; November 30, 1875; Mauna ʻAla Royal Mausoleum
- Spouse: Caesar Kapaʻakea
- Issue: James Kaliokalani; King David Kalākaua; Queen Lydia Liliʻuokalani; Anna Kaʻiulani; Kaʻiminaʻauao; Miriam Likelike; William Pitt Leleiohoku II
Names
- Analea Keohokālole
- House: Kalākaua
- Father: High Chief ʻAikanaka
- Mother: High Chiefess Kamaʻeokalani

Analea Keohokālole (c. 1816–1869) was a Hawaiian chiefess and matriarch of the House of Kalākaua that ruled the Kingdom of Hawaiʻi from 1874 to 1893. Her Hawaiian name Keohokālole means "the straight hair of her own father's tresses" and was given to her at birth by Queen Kaʻahumanu.

== Life ==
Keohokālole was born at Kailua-Kona, Hawaii in about 1816. She was daughter of the High Chiefess Kamaeokalani and the High Chief ʻAikanaka. Through her father she was descended from Kame'eiamoku and Keawe-a-Heulu two of the four Kona chiefs that supported Kamehameha I.

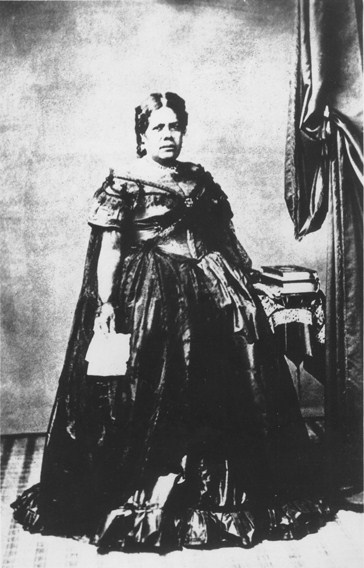
Keohokālole

In 1833 she married Caesar Kapaʻakea, a chief of lesser rank and her first cousin. Their union produced more than ten children. They were among the few Hawaiian chiefs to have such a large family. Many nobles of their time died very young and issueless. Their children were: James, David, Lydia, Anna, Kaʻiminaʻauao, Miriam, and Leleiohoku. She inherited vast tracts of land from her paternal grandmother Keohohiwa and great uncle Naihe. Like many of the high chiefs, she quickly found herself land rich but cash poor. The wealthiest chief was the monarch with landholding worth perhaps $1.3 billion in today's dollars. Unlike the monarch, the average high chief got an award, after taxes, of perhaps just a bit over $3.5 million. Keohokālole gained lands worth quite a bit more than the average chief. By the time of her death, only half the land she inherited from her father remained, which had to be divided by her four surviving children: David, William, Miriam and Lydia. When David Kalākaua became king less than twenty years later he had no great personal wealth. His lack of money and his attempts at securing income commensurate with his view of his station caused his reign to be dogged by bribery and corruption scandals.

She served as a member of the House of Nobles from 1841 to 1847, and on the King's Privy Council 1846 to 1847. She died at Hilo, on April 5 or April 6, 1869.

Initially buried in the Kawaiahaʻo Cemetery, her son Kalākaua had her remains removed to the Royal Mausoleum of Hawaii on November 30, 1875.

There is a road named Ane Keohokālole highway near Kailua-Kona, Hawaii.

== Family tree ==
Kalākaua family tree

Key- (k)= Kane (male/husband)
(w)= wahine (female/wife)
Subjects with bold titles, lavender highlighted, bold box= Direct bloodline
Bold title, bold, grey box= Aunts, uncles, cousins line
Bold title, bold white box= European or American (raised to aliʻi status by marriage or monarch's decree)
Regular name and box= makaʻāinana or untitled foreign subject

Kāneikaiwilani (k)
Lonoikahaupu (k)
Keawepoepoe (k)
Kameʻeiamoku (k)
Kepoʻokalani (k)
Kamanawa II (k)
Kapaʻakea (1815–1866)
Kaliokalani (1835–1852)

Kanalohanaui (k) | Keākealani (w) | Ahu-a-ʻI (k) | Piʻilani (w) II | Moana (k)
Kalanikauleleiaiwi (w) | Kauauaʻamahi (k) | Keawe II (k) | Lonomaʻaikanaka (w) | Kauhiahaki (k) | ʻIliki-ā-Moana (w)
Kanoena (w) | Haʻaeamahi (k) | Kekelakekeokalani (w) | Alapaʻi Nui (k) | Keaka (w) | Keeaumoku Nui (k) | Kamakaimoku (w) | Kaeamamao (k) (Note: Genealogy of Liliuokalani, page 400, appendix B, No. 2 Queen of Hawaii, Liliuokalani (1898). Hawaii's Story by Hawaii's Queen. University of Hawaii Press. p. 400. "Kapaakea genealogy.") | Kaolanialiʻi (w)
Kamakaʻeheikuli (w) | Keōua (k) | Kahekili II (k) | Kekuiapoiwa II (w) | Ikuaʻana (w) | Heulu (k) | Moana (w) | Keaweʻopala (k) | Nohomualani (k)
Keaweaheulu (k) | Ululani (w) | Hakau (w) | Kanaʻina (k) | Kauwa (w) | Eia (k)
Alapai (w) | Keohohiwa (w) | Keōpūolani (w) | Kamehameha I | Kalaniʻōpuʻu (k) | Kānekapōlei (w) | Kiʻilaweau (k) | Nāhiʻōleʻa (k) | Kahoʻowaha II (w) | Inaina (w)
Hao (K) | Kailipakalua (w)
Kamokuiki (w) | ʻAikanaka (k) | Kamaeokalani (w) | Kaōleiokū (k) | Keoua (w) | Luahine (w) | Kalaʻimamahu | Kaheiheimālie
Kamehameha II | Kamehameha III | Kekūanaōʻa (k) | Kahalaiʻa; Luanuʻu (k) | Pauahi (w) | Kīnaʻu (w) | Pākī (k) | Kōnia (w) | Kanaʻina II | Kaʻahumanu III
Keohokālole (1816–1869) | Keʻelikōlani (w) | Kamehameha IV | Kamehameha V | Kaʻahumanu IV | Pauahi Bishop (w) | Bishop (k) | Lunalilo (k)
Kalākaua (1836–1891) | Kapiʻolani (1834–1899) | Liliʻuokalani (1838–1917) | Dominis (1832–1891) | Kaʻiulani (1842–?) | Kaʻiminaʻauao (1845–1848) | Cleghorn (1835–1910) | Likelike (1851–1887) | Leleiohoku II (1854–1877)
Kaʻiulani (1875–1899)
