= Ululani =

- Aliʻi Nui (ruler) of Hilo
- Spouse: Keawemaʻuhili; Keawe-a-Heulu
- Issue: Keaweokahikiona; Elelule Laʻakeaelelulu; Naihe; Keohohiwa
- Father: Mokulani
- Mother: Pāpaʻikaniau (Niau)

Ululani was a Hawaiian chiefess, 7th Aliʻi Nui (ruler) of Hilo. She is also known as Ululani Nui ("Ululani the Great") and was the most celebrated woman poet of her day.

== Biography ==
She was a daughter and successor of the chief Mokulani and the chiefess Pāpaʻikaniau, otherwise known as Niau, the daughter of Kuʻimeheua and Kalanikūʻēʻiwalono.

Her name can mean "heavenly inspiration and growth", "raised to prominence" and it can mean "a royal assemblage or collection".

She was married to Keawemaʻuhili and had two sons with him: Keaweokahikona and ʻElelule Laʻakeaʻelelule. She was also married to Keawe-a-Heulu, and their children were orator Nāʻihe and chiefess Keohohiwa, mother of ʻAikanaka.

== Family tree ==
Kalākaua family tree

Key- (k)= Kane (male/husband)
(w)= wahine (female/wife)
Subjects with bold titles, lavender highlighted, bold box= Direct bloodline
Bold title, bold, grey box= Aunts, uncles, cousins line
Bold title, bold white box= European or American (raised to aliʻi status by marriage or monarch's decree)
Regular name and box= makaʻāinana or untitled foreign subject

Kāneikaiwilani (k)
Lonoikahaupu (k)
Keawepoepoe (k)
Kameʻeiamoku (k)
Kepoʻokalani (k)
Kamanawa II (k)
Kapaʻakea (1815–1866)
Kaliokalani (1835–1852)

Kanalohanaui (k)	Keākealani (w)	Ahu-a-ʻI (k)	Piʻilani (w) II	Moana (k)
Kalanikauleleiaiwi (w)	Kauauaʻamahi (k)	Keawe II (k)	Lonomaʻaikanaka (w)	Kauhiahaki (k)	ʻIliki-ā-Moana (w)
Kanoena (w)	Haʻaeamahi (k)	Kekelakekeokalani (w)	Alapaʻi Nui (k)	Keaka (w)	Keeaumoku Nui (k)	Kamakaimoku (w)	Kaeamamao (k) (Note: Genealogy of Liliuokalani, page 400, appendix B, No. 2 Queen of Hawaii, Liliuokalani (1898). Hawaii's Story by Hawaii's Queen. University of Hawaii Press. p. 400. "Kapaakea genealogy.")	Kaolanialiʻi (w)
Kamakaʻeheikuli (w)	Keōua (k)	Kahekili II (k)	Kekuiapoiwa II (w)	Ikuaʻana (w)	Heulu (k)	Moana (w)	Keaweʻopala (k)	Nohomualani (k)
Keaweaheulu (k)	Ululani (w)	Hakau (w)	Kanaʻina (k)	Kauwa (w)	Eia (k)
Alapai (w)	Keohohiwa (w)	Keōpūolani (w)	Kamehameha I	Kalaniʻōpuʻu (k)	Kānekapōlei (w)	Kiʻilaweau (k)	Nāhiʻōleʻa (k)	Kahoʻowaha II (w)	Inaina (w)
Hao (K)	Kailipakalua (w)
Kamokuiki (w)	ʻAikanaka (k)	Kamaeokalani (w)	Kaōleiokū (k)	Keoua (w)	Luahine (w)	Kalaʻimamahu	Kaheiheimālie
Kamehameha II	Kamehameha III	Kekūanaōʻa (k)	Kahalaiʻa; Luanuʻu (k)	Pauahi (w)	Kīnaʻu (w)	Pākī (k)	Kōnia (w)	Kanaʻina II	Kaʻahumanu III
Keohokālole (1816–1869)	Keʻelikōlani (w)	Kamehameha IV	Kamehameha V	Kaʻahumanu IV	Pauahi Bishop (w)	Bishop (k)	Lunalilo (k)
Kalākaua (1836–1891)	Kapiʻolani (1834–1899)	Liliʻuokalani (1838–1917)	Dominis (1832–1891)	Kaʻiulani (1842–?)	Kaʻiminaʻauao (1845–1848)	Cleghorn (1835–1910)	Likelike (1851–1887)	Leleiohoku II (1854–1877)
Kaʻiulani (1875–1899)
