= Kepoʻokalani =

High Chief during the Kingdom of Hawaiʻi (born c. 1760)

- Born: c. 1760
- Spouse: Alapai Wahine; Keohohiwa; Nune
- Issue: Kamanawa II Kapelakapuokakae ʻAikanaka Kalailua, Piʻianaiʻa
- Father: Kameʻeiamoku
- Mother: Kamakaʻeheikuli

Kepoʻokalani was a High Chief during the founding of the Kingdom of Hawaii. Two of his grandchildren would marry each other, and two of his great-grandchildren would be the last two ruling monarchs of the Kingdom.

== Life ==
Kepookalani was born around 1760. His mother was Kamakaʻeheikuli and father was Kameʻeiamoku. He was half-cousin of Kamehameha I, and named after the only full brother of Kamehameha usually called Keliimaikai or Keapo o Kepoʻokalani. His notable half-brothers (with different mothers) were Hoʻolulu and Ulumāheihei Hoapili who both became close advisors to Kamehameha and were trusted to aid in his burial. In the Hawaiian language, ke po'o ka lani means "the royal leader". He married his cousin Chiefess Alapaʻi Wahine and they had a son Kamanawa II (c. 1785–1840) and another son Kapelakapuokakae. Kamanawa was named after the Kamanawa who was a twin of Kepoʻokalani's father. Often he is called Kamanawa ʻŌpio or ʻElua because ʻōpio means "junior" and ʻelua means "second" in Hawaiian. Kamanawa was convicted of the murder of his wife in 1840 and executed.

Kepoʻokalani also married High Chiefess Keohohiwa and had son ʻAikanaka (c. 1790–1868), a child named Kalailua, and then married a Chiefess named Nune (spelled Nenew in some sources) and had a daughter named Piʻianaiʻa.

Kamanawa's son Caesar Kapaʻakea (1815–1866) would marry ʻAikanaka's daughter Analea Keohokālole. They were half-cousins, since they shared only a grandfather, with different grandmothers. Their children were called the House of Kalākaua, including the last two ruling monarchs of the Kingdom: King David Kalākaua (1836–1891) and Queen Liliʻuokalani (1839–1893). Kepoʻokalani was their "double great-grandfather" or "great-grandfather from both sides". This kind of family background was a desirable way to enhance the royal bloodlines at the time, but was attacked by the conservative missionaries later in the 19th century as incest. Even some of the other royals snubbed Kalākaua and did not congratulate him when he came to the throne in 1874.

The Isaac Hale Beach Park on the island of Hawaii was named for a descendant who lived in the area named Isaac Kepoʻokalani Hale.

== Family tree ==
Kalākaua family tree

Key- (k)= Kane (male/husband)
(w)= wahine (female/wife)
Subjects with bold titles, lavender highlighted, bold box= Direct bloodline
Bold title, bold, grey box= Aunts, uncles, cousins line
Bold title, bold white box= European or American (raised to aliʻi status by marriage or monarch's decree)
Regular name and box= makaʻāinana or untitled foreign subject

Kāneikaiwilani (k)
Lonoikahaupu (k)
Keawepoepoe (k)
Kameʻeiamoku (k)
Kepoʻokalani (k)
Kamanawa II (k)
Kapaʻakea (1815–1866)
Kaliokalani (1835–1852)

Kanalohanaui (k)	Keakealani (w)	Ahu-a-ʻI (k)	Piʻilani (w) II	Moana (k)
Kalanikauleleiaiwi (w)	Kauauaʻamahi (k)	Keawe II (k)	Lonomaʻaikanaka (w)	Kauhiahaki (k)	Iliki-a-Moana (w)
Kanoena (w)	Haʻaeamahi (k)	Kekelakekeokalani (w)	Alapainui (k)	Keaka (w)	Keeaumoku Nui (k)	Kamakaimoku (w)	Kaeamamao (k) (Note: Genealogy of Liliuokalani, page 400, appendix B, No. 2 Queen of Hawaii, Liliuokalani (1898). Hawaii's Story by Hawaii's Queen. University of Hawaii Press. p. 400. "Kapaakea genealogy.")	Kaolanialiʻi (w)
Kamakaʻeheikuli (w)	Keōua (k)	Kahekili II (k)	Kekuiapoiwa II (w)	Ikuaʻana (w)	Heulu (k)	Moana (w)	Keaweʻopala (k)	Nohomualani (k)
Keaweaheulu (k)	Ululani (w)	Hakau (w)	Kanaʻina (k)	Kauwa (w)	Eia (k)
Alapai (w)	Keohohiwa (w)	Keōpūolani (w)	Kamehameha I	Kalaniʻōpuʻu (k)	Kānekapōlei (w)	Kiʻilaweau (k)	Nāhiʻōleʻa (k)	Kahoʻowaha II (w)	Inaina (w)
Hao (K)	Kailipakalua (w)
Kamokuiki (w)	ʻAikanaka (k)	Kamaeokalani (w)	Kaōleiokū (k)	Keoua (w)	Luahine (w)	Kalaʻimamahu	Kaheiheimālie
Kamehameha II	Kamehameha III	Kekūanaōʻa (k)	Kahalaiʻa; Luanuʻu (k)	Pauahi (w)	Kīnaʻu (w)	Pākī (k)	Kōnia (w)	Kanaʻina II	Kaʻahumanu III
Keohokālole (1816–1869)	Keʻelikōlani (w)	Kamehameha IV	Kamehameha V	Kaʻahumanu IV	Pauahi Bishop (w)	Bishop (k)	Lunalilo (k)
Kalākaua (1836–1891)	Kapiʻolani (1834–1899)	Liliʻuokalani (1838–1917)	Dominis (1832–1891)	Kaʻiulani (1842–?)	Kaʻiminaʻauao (1845–1848)	Cleghorn (1835–1910)	Likelike (1851–1887)	Leleiohoku II (1854–1877)
Kaʻiulani (1875–1899)
