= House of Kalākaua =

Royal family of Hawaiʻi

- Royal dynasty
- Coat of arms of the Kingdom of Hawaii
- Parent house: House of Piʻilani, House of 'I-Kanaka, House of Keawe
- Country: Kingdom of Hawaii
- Founded: 1874; 152 years ago
- Founder: Kalākaua
- Final ruler: Liliuokalani
- Titles: King/Queen of Hawaii, High Chief, Ali'i
- Styles: "Majesty" "Grace"
- Estate: ʻIolani Palace (seat)
- Dissolution: 1917
- Deposition: 1893 (deposed by a coup d'état)
- Cadet branches: House of Kawānanakoa

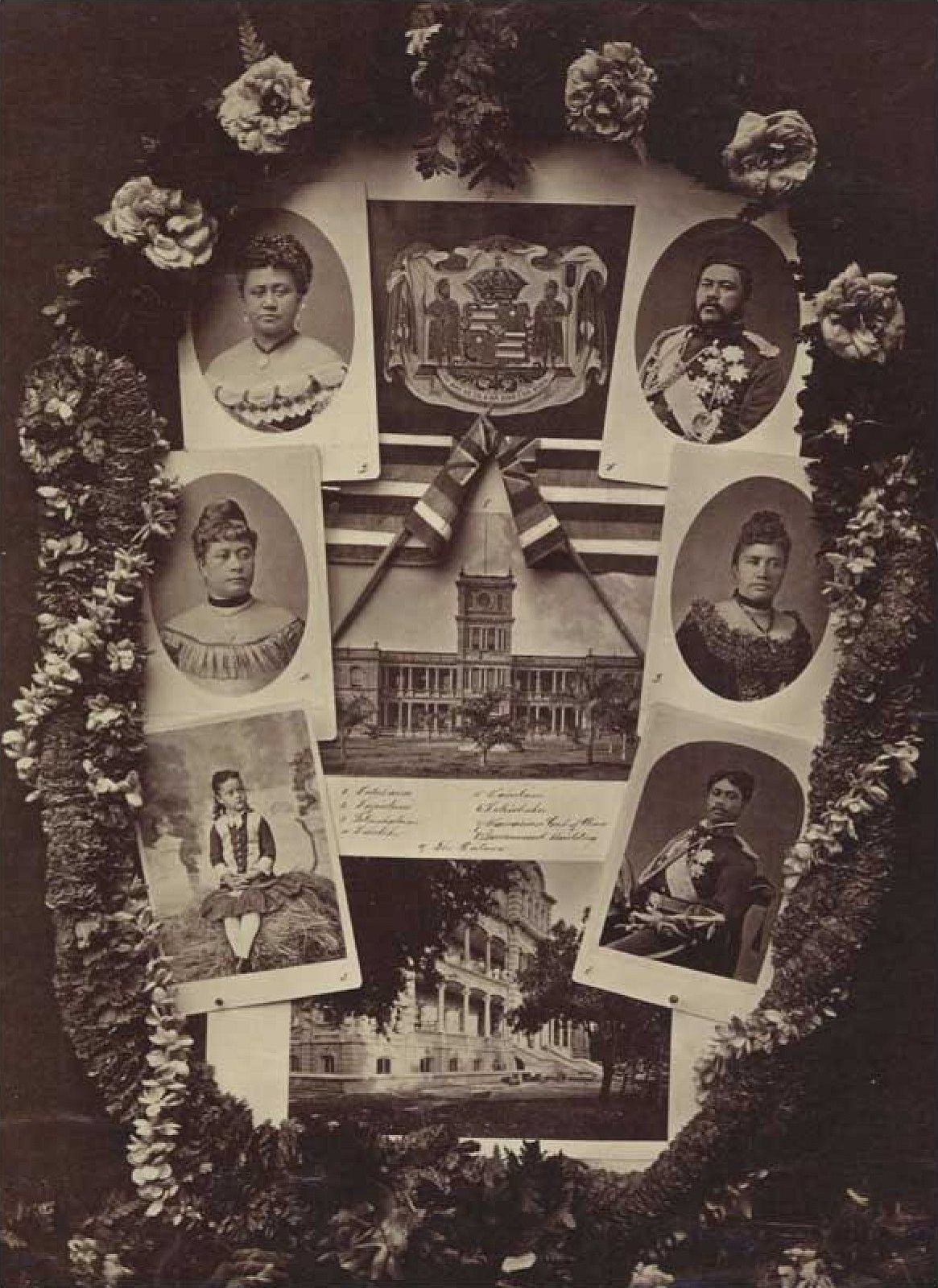
Collage showing King Kalākaua and family. Left to right from top: Queen Kapiʻolani, King Kalākaua, Princess Likelike, Queen Liliʻuokalani, Princess Kaʻiulani, and Prince Leleiohoku.

The House of Kalākaua, or Kalākaua Dynasty, also known as the Keawe-a-Heulu line, was the reigning family of the Kingdom of Hawaiʻi under King Kalākaua and Queen Liliʻuokalani. They assumed power after the last king of the House of Kamehameha, Lunalilo, died without designating an heir, leading to the election of Kalākaua and provoking the Honolulu Courthouse riot. The dynasty lost power with the overthrow of Liliʻuokalani and the end of the Kingdom in 1893. Liliʻuokalani died in 1917, leaving only cousins as heirs.

The House of Kalākaua was descended from chiefs on the islands of Hawaiʻi, Maui, and Kauaʻi. The torch that burns at midday symbolizes the dynasty, based on the sacred kapu Kalākaua's ancestor High Chief Iwikauikaua.

== Origin ==
The dynasty was founded by Kalākaua when he ascended the Hawaiian Kingdom throne in 1874 and included his brothers and sisters who were children of Analea Keohokālole (1816–1869) and Caesar Kaluaiku Kapaʻakea (1815–1866). The family was of the aliʻi class of the Hawaiian nobility and were collateral relations of the House of Kamehameha, sharing common descent from the early 18th-century aliʻi nui (supreme monarch) Keaweʻīkekahialiʻiokamoku. The family traces their descent from Keaweaheulu and Kameʻeiamoku, two of the five royal counselors of King Kamehameha I during his conquest of the Hawaiian Kingdom. Kameʻeiamoku, the grandfather of both Keohokālole and Kapaʻakea, was depicted, along with his royal twin Kamanawa, on the Hawaiian coat of arms. Liliʻuokalani, in her memoir, referred to her family line as the "Keawe-a-Heulu line" after her mother's side of the family.

== Fall of the House of Kalākaua ==
With the deposition of Queen Liliʻuokalani in 1893 the House of Kalākaua ceased to reign, and the death of the Princess Victoria Kaʻiulani in 1899 meant the loss of the last direct heir of the siblings of the reigning monarchs of House of Kalākaua. The main line of the dynasty thus ended when the deposed Queen Liliʻuokalani (who had abdicated and renounced) died in 1917. Their cousins came to be known as the House of Kawānanakoa, a branch of the House of Kalākaua, since they are relatives of King Kalākaua, descended from Prince David Kawānanakoa, eldest son of the princess Kūhiō Kinoike Kekaulike, who had died in 1908. The House of Kawānanakoa survives to modern times and at least two of its members have claims to the throne should the Hawaiian monarchy be revived.

== Members ==
- King Kalākaua (1836–1891)
- Queen Liliʻuokalani (1839–1917)
- Crown Princess Victoria Kaʻiulani (1875–1899)
- Crown Prince William Pitt Leleiohoku (1854–1877)
- Princess Miriam Likelike (1851–1887)
- Princess Kaʻiminaʻauao (1845–1848)
- Prince James Kaliokalani (1835–1852)
- High Chief Caesar Kapaʻakea (1815–1866)
- High Chiefess Analea Keohokālole (1816–1869)

Kalākaua family tree

Key- (k)= Kane (male/husband)
(w)= wahine (female/wife)
Subjects with bold titles, lavender highlighted, bold box= Direct bloodline
Bold title, bold, grey box= Aunts, uncles, cousins line
Bold title, bold white box= European or American (raised to aliʻi status by marriage or monarch's decree)
Regular name and box= makaʻāinana or untitled foreign subject

Kāneikaiwilani (k)
Lonoikahaupu (k)
Keawepoepoe (k)
Kameʻeiamoku (k)
Kepoʻokalani (k)
Kamanawa II (k)
Kapaʻakea (1815–1866)
Kaliokalani (1835–1852)

Kanalohanaui (k)	Keākealani (w)	Ahu-a-ʻI (k)	Piʻilani (w) II	Moana (k)
Kalanikauleleiaiwi (w)	Kauauaʻamahi (k)	Keawe II (k)	Lonomaʻaikanaka (w)	Kauhiahaki (k)	ʻIliki-ā-Moana (w)
Kanoena (w)	Haʻaeamahi (k)	Kekelakekeokalani (w)	Alapaʻi Nui (k)	Keaka (w)	Keeaumoku Nui (k)	Kamakaimoku (w)	Kaeamamao (k) (Note: Genealogy of Liliuokalani, page 400, appendix B, No. 2 Queen of Hawaii, Liliuokalani (1898). Hawaii's Story by Hawaii's Queen. University of Hawaii Press. p. 400. "Kapaakea genealogy.")	Kaolanialiʻi (w)
Kamakaʻeheikuli (w)	Keōua (k)	Kahekili II (k)	Kekuiapoiwa II (w)	Ikuaʻana (w)	Heulu (k)	Moana (w)	Keaweʻopala (k)	Nohomualani (k)
Keaweaheulu (k)	Ululani (w)	Hakau (w)	Kanaʻina (k)	Kauwa (w)	Eia (k)
Alapai (w)	Keohohiwa (w)	Keōpūolani (w)	Kamehameha I	Kalaniʻōpuʻu (k)	Kānekapōlei (w)	Kiʻilaweau (k)	Nāhiʻōleʻa (k)	Kahoʻowaha II (w)	Inaina (w)
Hao (K)	Kailipakalua (w)
Kamokuiki (w)	ʻAikanaka (k)	Kamaeokalani (w)	Kaōleiokū (k)	Keoua (w)	Luahine (w)	Kalaʻimamahu	Kaheiheimālie
Kamehameha II	Kamehameha III	Kekūanaōʻa (k)	Kahalaiʻa; Luanuʻu (k)	Pauahi (w)	Kīnaʻu (w)	Pākī (k)	Kōnia (w)	Kanaʻina II	Kaʻahumanu III
Keohokālole (1816–1869)	Keʻelikōlani (w)	Kamehameha IV	Kamehameha V	Kaʻahumanu IV	Pauahi Bishop (w)	Bishop (k)	Lunalilo (k)
Kalākaua (1836–1891)	Kapiʻolani (1834–1899)	Liliʻuokalani (1838–1917)	Dominis (1832–1891)	Kaʻiulani (1842–?)	Kaʻiminaʻauao (1845–1848)	Cleghorn (1835–1910)	Likelike (1851–1887)	Leleiohoku II (1854–1877)
Kaʻiulani (1875–1899)

== Bibliography ==
- Allen, Helena G. (1982). The Betrayal of Liliuokalani: Last Queen of Hawaii, 1838–1917. Glendale, CA: Arthur H. Clark Company. ISBN 978-0-87062-144-4. OCLC 9576325. Archived from the original on January 13, 2018.
- Gregg, David L. (1982). King, Pauline (ed.). The Diaries of David Lawrence Gregg: An American Diplomat in Hawaii, 1853–1858. Honolulu: Hawaiian Historical Society. ISBN 9780824808617. OCLC 8773139.
- Haley, James L. (2014). Captive Paradise: A History of Hawaii. New York: St. Martin's Press. ISBN 978-0-312-60065-5. OCLC 865158092. Archived from the original on June 13, 2020.
- Liliuokalani (1898). Hawaii's Story by Hawaii's Queen, Liliuokalani. Boston: Lee and Shepard. ISBN 978-0-548-22265-2. OCLC 2387226.
- Kuykendall, Ralph Simpson (1967). The Hawaiian Kingdom 1874–1893, The Kalakaua Dynasty. Vol. 3. Honolulu: University of Hawaii Press. ISBN 978-0-87022-433-1. OCLC 500374815. Archived from the original on January 20, 2015.
- Osorio, Jon Kamakawiwoʻole (2002). Dismembering Lāhui: A History of the Hawaiian Nation to 1887. Honolulu: University of Hawaii Press. ISBN 0-8248-2549-7. OCLC 48579247. Archived from the original on May 14, 2016.
- Pratt, Elizabeth Kekaaniauokalani Kalaninuiohilaukapu (1920). History of Keoua Kalanikupuapa-i-nui: Father of Hawaii Kings, and His Descendants, with Notes on Kamehameha I, First King of All Hawaii. Honolulu: Honolulu Star-Bulletin. OCLC 154181545. Archived from the original on May 3, 2016.
- Van Dyke, Jon M. (2008). Who Owns the Crown Lands of Hawaiʻi?. Honolulu: University of Hawaii Press. ISBN 978-0-8248-6560-3. OCLC 257449971. Archived from the original on November 11, 2016 – via Project MUSE.
