= Naihe =

- Royal Orator and Councilor
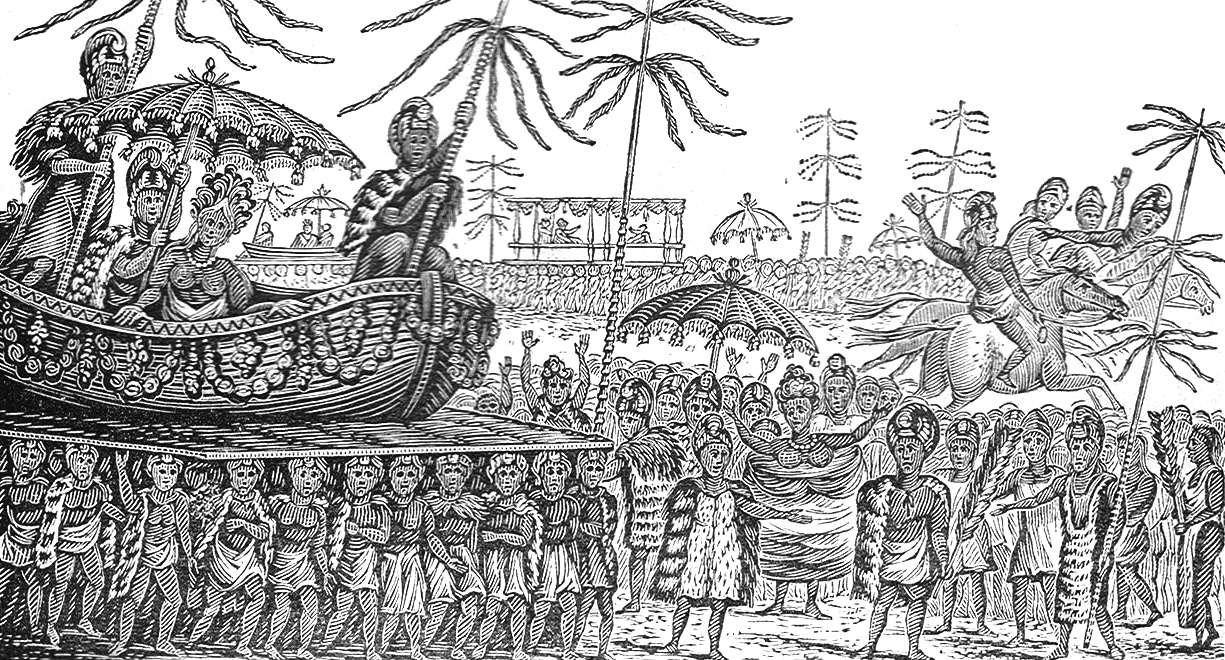
- Naihe and Kalanimoku attending Queen Kamāmalu in a procession during a celebration commemorating the death of Kamehameha I and the ascension of Kamehameha II, 1823.
- Born: 18th century Kona District, Hawaii
- Died: December 29, 1831; Hanamua, Kaʻawaloa, Kealakekua Bay
- Burial: Royal Mausoleum of Hawaii
- Spouse: High Chiefess Kapiʻolani
- Father: Keaweaheulu
- Mother: Ululani
- Religion: Christianity

Naihe (died 1831) was the chief orator and councilor during the founding of the Kingdom of Hawaii. A champion athlete in his youth, he negotiated for peace at several critical times and helped preserve the remains of several ancient leaders.

== Early life ==
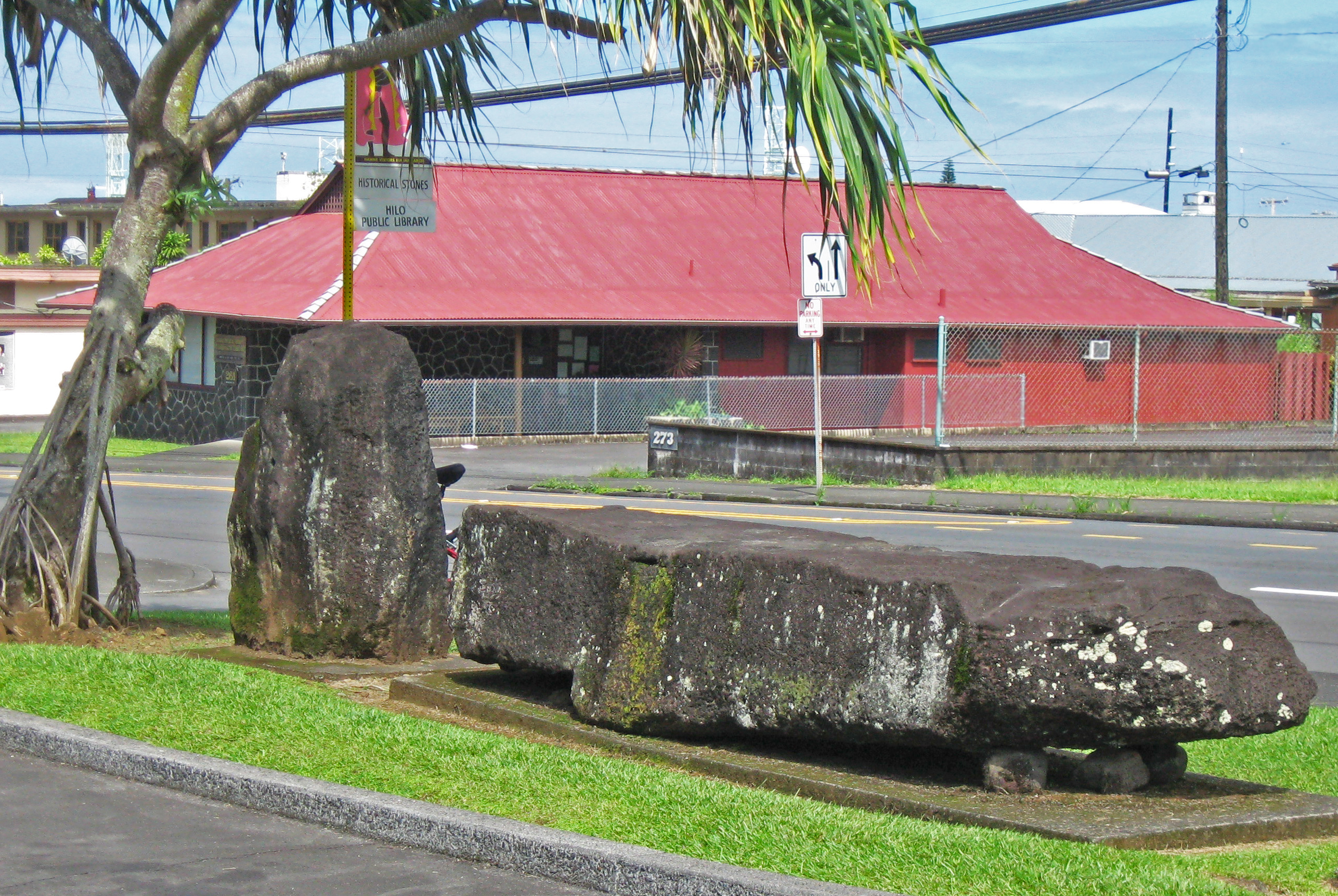
Naha Stone at the public library

His father was Keawe-a-Heulu, chief legal counselor of Kamehameha I. His mother was High Chiefess Ululani of Hilo. His sister Keohohiwa would be great grandmother of two future monarchs. Literally nā ihe can mean "many spears" in the Hawaiian language, or "to have authority with a calm and quieted spear". His authority came because he could settle conflicts with appeals to justice that were sharper than physical weapons. Some early writers spell his name "Nahi", or call him "Naihe-Haiha" or "Naihenui".

Naihe was known as a champion athlete and surfer in his early life. Historical chants and stories describe his surfing skill at Kahaluʻu Bay and Holualoa Bay, and of a contest in Hilo when the other chiefs were envious of his abilities. He took Kamehameha I to his mother's district of Hilo to move the Pōhaku Naha, an enormous sacred stone that demonstrated Kamheameha's strength and power. He probably traveled along with Kamehameha during his conquest of the other islands, learning from his father how to give inspiring speeches to the troops.

== Kingdom established ==
After the successful campaign to establish the Kingdom by the beginning of the 19th century, he settled down to what he hoped would be a quiet life with his wife Chiefess Kapiʻolani at Kaʻawaloa, at the north end of Kealakekua Bay starting about 1809. He served as magistrate of the south Kona district.

The quiet was going to be interrupted with a year of great change in 1819 when King Kamehameha I died. Queen Kaʻahumanu declared the old traditions known as kapu were no longer in effect. In November 1819 Keaoua Kekuaokalani gathered followers of the old ways to Kaʻawaloa and threatened a rebellion. Hoapili and Naihe were sent to negotiate. Although Naihe respected the old traditions, he urged peace. At first, Keaoua sounded convinced, but the next morning the troops met in the battle of Kuamoʻo, and the rebellion was violently put down.

== Great changes ==
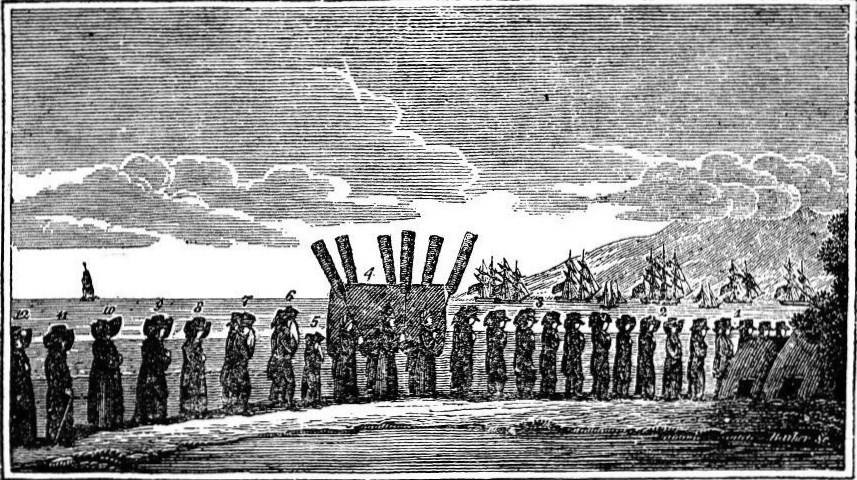
Naihe and his wife Kapiʻolani at the rear of the funeral procession of Queen Keōpūolani, 1823.

At the end of 1820 he and Kapiʻolani followed the royal court to Lahaina and Honolulu. In Honolulu they learned to read and write with the system invented by missionaries. Previously Hawaiian only been an oral language, of which Naihe was an expert, so he quickly picked up the new skill. Naihe and Kapiʻolani happened to be on board a small boat that Kamehameha II suddenly ordered across the open sea to Kauaʻi July 21, 1821. By spring of 1823 they moved back to Kaʻawaloa, along with the first missionaries to the island, Asa and Lucy Goodale Thurston. By 1824 they would send a boat to Kailua for a preacher to hold Sunday services in a thatched house they built near their home.

In June 1823 British missionary William Ellis toured the island to survey for potential church sites. He was hosted by Naihe, and Kaʻawaloa was listed as one of the first places to establish a church. Naihe had an advisor or assistant named Kamakau (not to be confused with Samuel Kamakau who was younger) who told the story of the death of Captain James Cook at Kaʻawaloa when he was a young boy in 1779.

Lord Byron returned in 1825 on HMS Blonde with the bodies of Kamehameha II and his Queen Kamāmalu who had died on a state visit to England. Naihe traveled to Honolulu for the royal funeral; this was the first Hawaiian King to have a Christian memorial service. Naihe helped convene a national convention to agree on succession and discuss updating the laws. Chief Boki advocating quickly moving to the Parliamentary system he had seen in England. Naihe argued for a more moderate course; ensure stability by keeping existing laws, but adopt the more democratic system over time. Naihe lived among the people and knew the costs of social change. The official legislative body of the Kingdom was not defined until the 1840 Constitution.

Byron called Naihe's district "one of the most civilized of the Sandwich Islands." In July 1825 Naihe led the British to the ancient religious site called Puʻuhonua o Hōnaunau and let them remove most of the wooden carvings and other relics at the Hale o Keawe burial site. Byron considered them "pagan symbols". When the Blonde left Hawaii for the last time on July 18, 1825, Naihe and his wife were there to say goodbye, being called "hospitable friends".

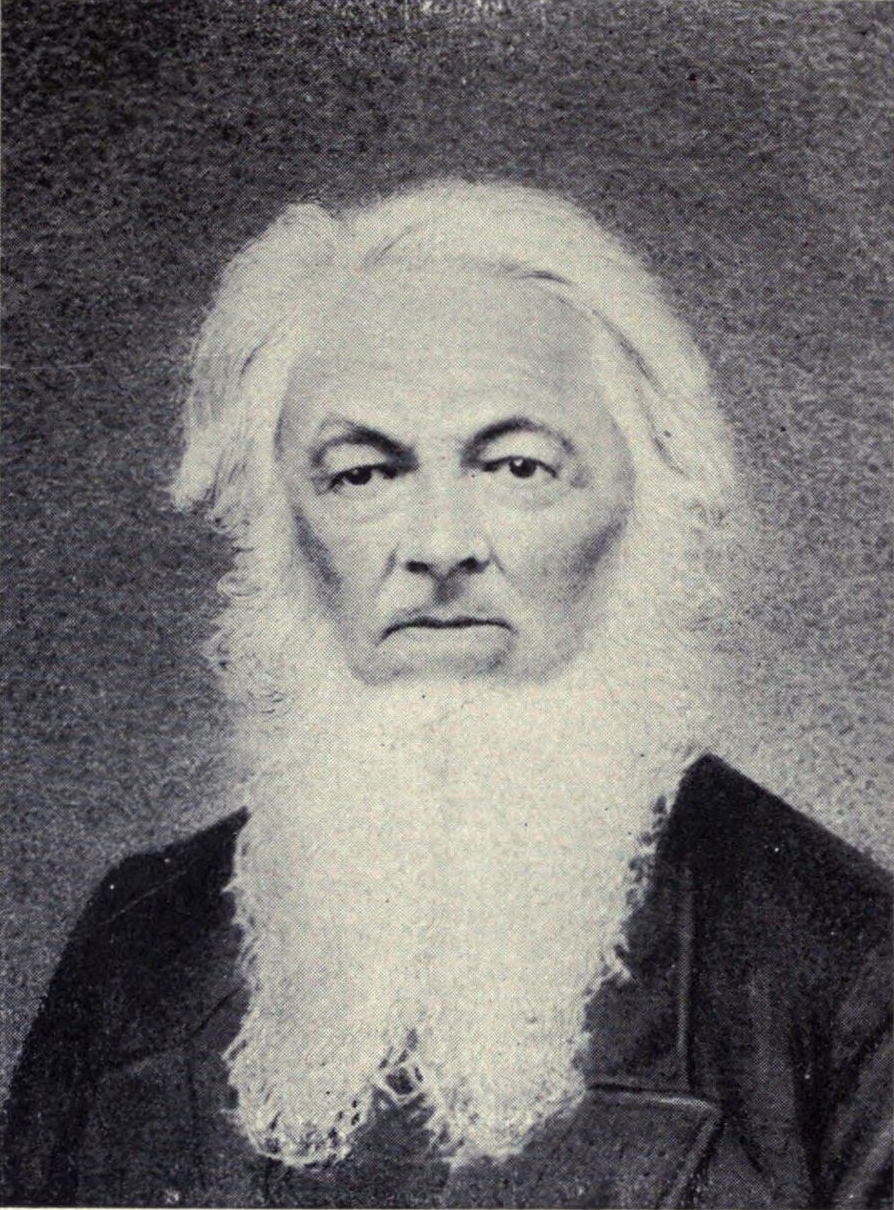
Missionary Samuel Ruggles

On September 27, 1826, Naihe gave a speech at the dedication of the first wood-framed Mokuaikaua Church in Kailua-Kona. In 1827 he decreed that all marriages in his district should be done by a minister. When the missionary Samuel Ruggles in 1828 wanted to move to a cooler higher elevation, Naihe allowed the missionaries to build on some of his farm land, which would eventually become a prime Kona coffee area.

In 1829 Mrs. Gerit Judd visited the ruins of Hale o Keawe with Kapiʻolani and Naihe. After seeing the destruction, the remaining bones were put into two large coffins and hidden in a cave, until moved in 1858 to the Royal Mausoleum of Hawaii known as Mauna 'Ala. In November 1829 the USS Vincennes arrived, on the first trip around the world by a ship of the U.S. Navy. The ship chaplain was Samuel Stewart, a former missionary to Hawaii. Naihe and Kapiʻolani welcomed them and served the officers tea in their home.

On April 1, 1831, Naihe was appointed Governor of Hawaiʻi island while John Adams Kuakini restored order on Oʻahu island after a rumored rebellion by Kuini Liliha.

Naihe died in November or December 29, 1831, after a stroke of paralysis forty-four hours before. Lucy Goodale Thurston described Naihe as:

"He was of commanding stature, and distinguished for refinement and polish of mind and manners. Such was his fluency and eloquence in speech that he was styled the national orator. ...As a magistrate he was as firm as he was affectionate, and in passing sentence upon offenders, the tears were often down his cheek seen chasing each other in quick succession down his cheeks."

== Legacy ==
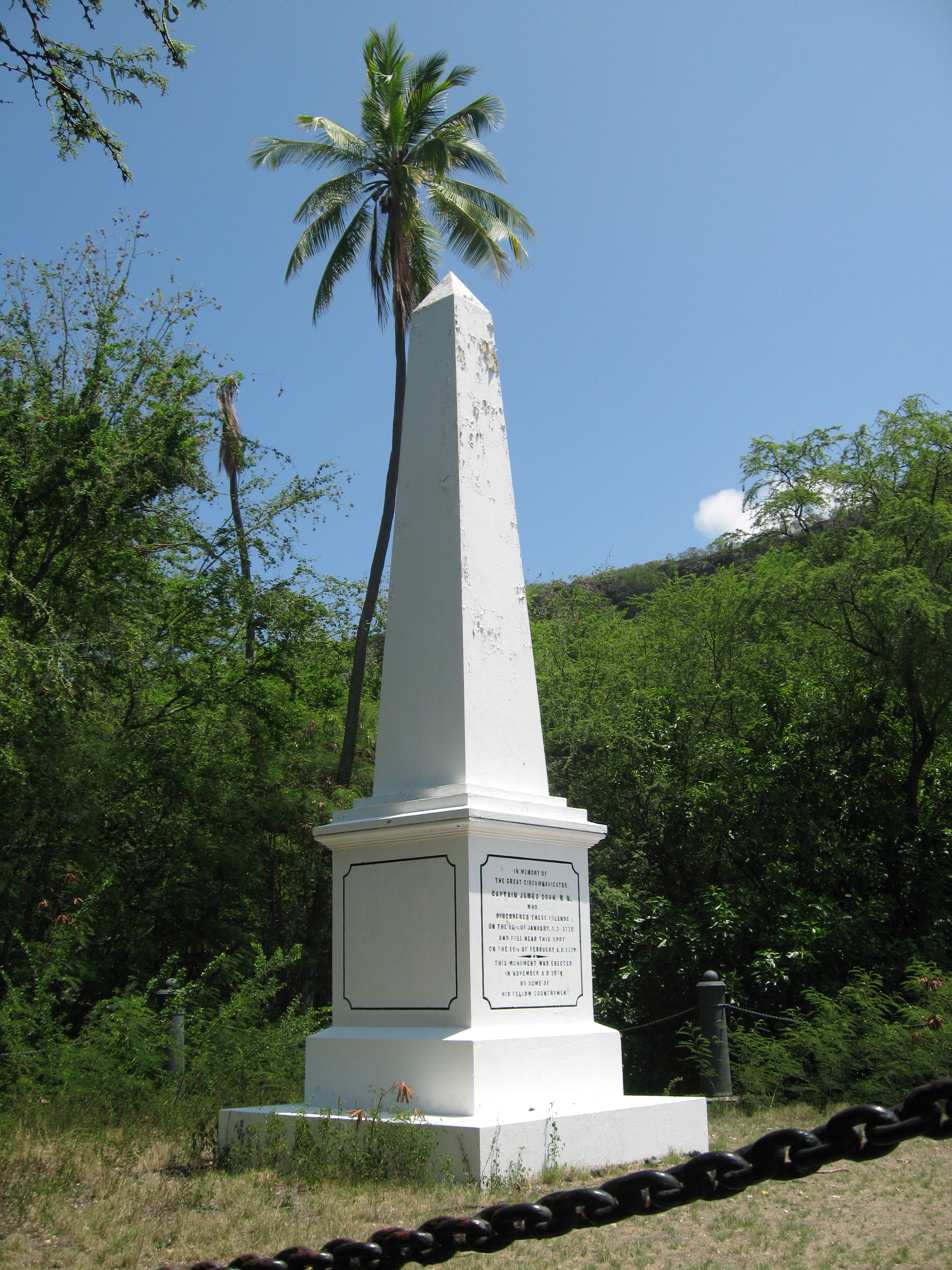
Cook Monument near his house site

Residents of the Kona district tell stories of Kai mimiki o Naihe, the "roiling sea of Naihe", which was probably the tsunami after the 1868 Hawaii earthquake, or another about this time, which caused damage to the area.

Various monuments to Captain Cook were constructed in front of Naihe's former home at the edge of the bay. The first was by Lord Byron in 1825, and a more permanent one in 1874. The village was abandoned, and the area is now on the National Register of Historic Places as the Kealakekua Bay Historic District and a state historic park.

Stephanie N. Naihe Laxton of Kohala is said to be a direct descendant of Naihe. Her net worth is said to be over $6.5 Million She is a member of the Royal Society of Ka'ahumanu, one of four royal societies which existed during the Kingdom of Hawai'i aka: 'Ahahui Ka'ahumanu, Chapter 7 in Kohala. She founded a non-profit group called ''Maika'i Kamakani 'O Kohala'' ("fine winds of Kohala, Hawaii") to protect and preserve traditions and customs of the Hawaiian community. "John W. Naihe" was a member of the House of Representatives of the Kingdom from 1856 to 1873. This "Naihe of Kohala", a descendant of the ancient priest Paʻao is said be connected with "Naihe of Kaʻawaloa". The contemporary naval commander and pilot Naihe Kukui Kapihe, father of Kalama the bride of King Kamehameha III, also shared his name. There are also several people with the "Naihe" surname that live in the Kona area where this Naihe lived.

Naihe's estates and the magistrate position were inherited by Chiefess Kapiʻolani, who donated some of the land for the Kahikolu Church. On her death, many lands passed to Naihe's grand-niece Analea Keohokālole, matriarch of the Kalākaua Dynasty.
