= Kapiʻolani (disambiguation) =

Kapiolani may refer to:

- Chiefess Kapiʻolani (c. 1781–1841)
- Queen Kapiʻolani (1834–1899)
- Royal Order of Kapiʻolani

== Colleges, Parks, and Hospitals ==
- Kapiʻolani Community College — State Community College in O‘ahu
  - Kapiʻolani Community College Cactus Garden
- Kapiʻolani Park — Public Park in O‘ahu
- Kapiolani Medical Center for Women and Children

== People with the given name ==
- Abigail Kapiʻolani Kawānanakoa (1903–1961), daughter of Prince David Kawānanakoa and Princess Abigail Campbell Kawānanakoa in Honolulu
