= Kameʻeiamoku =

Hawaiian high chief

- On the right is Kameʻeiamoku
- Died: 1802; Puʻuki, Lahaina, Maui
- Spouse: Kamakaʻeheikuli; Kealiʻiokahekili; Kahikoloa of Kauaʻi; Puhipuhiʻili; Kauhilanahonua
- Issue: Kepoʻokalani; Ulumāheihei Hoapili; Hoʻolulu; Loe-wahine; Kekikipaʻa
- Father: Keawepoepoe
- Mother: Kanoena

Kameʻeiamoku (died 1802) was a Hawaiian high chief and the Counselor of State to King Kamehameha I. He was called Kamehameha's uncle, but he was really the cousin of Kamehameha's mother, Kekuiapoiwa II.

== Birth and ancestry ==
Along with his twin brother Kamanawa, Kameʻeiamoku's parents were the keiki aliʻi (prince or child of a chief), Keawepoepoe and Kanoena (w). As the son of Kalanikauleleiaiwi and Lonoikahaupu, monarch's of several kingdoms between them, Keawepoepoe was an aliʻi (noble) of Hawaii, Maui, Oahu and Kauai. As well being an aliʻi nui (great king or supreme monarch) Lonoikahaupu was a kahuna (priest) of the order of Lono (order of Nahulu or Holoa'e), one of two priestly orders, Kū (Kuali'i or Kauali'i) being the other. Through this union Keawepoepoe received the kapu o pahenakalani (the prostrating kapu) which is how the Hawaii aliʻi received the kapu (a religious code of conduct) called the kapu moe.

Fornander identifies their mother, Kanoena, as the daughter of Lonoanahulu from the Ehu ohana (family). Almira Hollander Pitman refers to Kanoena in 1931 as Keawepoepoe's cousin. However, in the Hawaiian Genealogy book volume 44: "Eia ka lani ke koi pae moku ka lauhulu paoki o ka aina", it shows Lonoanahulu marrying Hikuakanaloauuoo and having Manohili who marries Halao, which is the couple that has Kanoena. That would make Lonoanahulua Kanoena's grandfather. Kamakau lists Mano-hili as one of the men who assisted Kameʻeiamoku in his attack on the Fair American. Fornander also refers to Lonoanahulu, along with the Kameʻeiamoku and Kamanawa in regards to lands passed down to them from Liloa;

"Liloa, [king of Hawaii], gave Kekaha in Kona, Hawaii, to Laeanuikekaumanamana in perpetuity, and it descended to his grandchildren through Kualii, Kauluoaonana, Wahulu, Lonoanahulu, etc. to Kameeiamoku and Kamanawa. Umi likewise gave Kapalilua, in South Kona, to his child Kapunanahuanui-a-Umi, from whom it descended through Ua, Iwikaualii, lama to Keeaumoku".

== The Metcalfes, the Eleanora and the Fair American ==
In 1790, the American maritime fur trader Simon Metcalfe of the ship Eleanora mistreated Kameʻeiamoku when he boarded his ship. Metcalfe later fired his cannons on the villagers of Olowalu, killing about one hundred. In retaliation, Kameʻeiamoku attacked the next American ship to appear, the schooner Fair American, under the command of Thomas Humphrey Metcalfe, the son of Simon Metcalfe. All but one of the schooner's crew was killed, including Thomas Humphrey Metcalfe. The lone survivor was Welsh sailor Isaac Davis. Another sailor from the Eleanora, Englishman John Young, was sent ashore to find out what happened, and was also captured. Davis and Young would both become military advisors and translators for Kamehameha.

Kameʻeiamoku participated in negotiating a treaty in February 1795 with George Vancouver for British support of Kamehameha.

== Kamehameha and the unification of the islands ==
Kameʻeiamoku and his twin Kamanawa were among the four great aliʻi warriors of Kona to support Kamehameha I in his rebellion against his cousin Kīwalaʻō; the other two being their half brother Keʻeaumoku Pāpaʻiahiahi, and Keawe-a-Heulu. These were known as the "Four Kona chiefs". They, along with Kamehameha's kumu (teacher) of Kapu Kuialua named Kekūhaupiʻo, were the center of the war council for Kamehameha when he took power in the battle of Mokuʻōhai in 1782, which strengthened his influence.

== Family ==
Kameʻeiamoku had three or four wives and at least three sons. His first wife, Kamakaʻeheikuli, was the mother of Kepoʻokalani (c. 1760–?) who was the double great-grandfather of the last two monarchs of the Kingdom. His second wife Kealiʻiokahekili was the mother of Ulumāheihei Hoapili (c. 1776–1840). His third wife Kahikoloa was mother of Hoʻolulu (1794–?). Kameʻeiamoku's descendants succeeded him in assisting Kamehameha after his death in 1802 in Lahaina on Maui.

== Legacy ==
Through his son Kepoʻokalani came the House of Kalākaua. One of his other sons Hoʻolulu would be the father of Kinoʻole o Liliha who married the notable American businessman Benjamin Pitman. Daughter Kekikipaa would marry Kamehameha I, but then marry Keawemauhili and become the mother of High Chiefess Kapiʻolani.

He lives on the coat of arms of the Kingdom of Hawaii. On each side of the coat of arms was the figure of a chief in a feather cloak and a feather helmet. The one on the left, bearing a spear, was Kamanawa and the one on the right, with a Kahili (feather standard), was Kameʻeiamoku. The land he was given in 1795 was used by his granddaughter Kuini Liliha, who donated it to Christian missionaries. It eventually became Punahou School in 1841.

== Ancestry ==
Keawepoepoe family tree

Family tree based on Abraham Fornander's; "An Account of the Polynesian Race" and other works from the author, Queen Liliuokalani's; "Hawaii's Story by Hawaii's Queen", Samuel Mānaiakalani Kamakau's; "Ruling Chiefs of Hawaii" and other works by the author, John Papa ʻĪʻī's; "Fragments of Hawaiian History", Edith Kawelohea McKinzie's; "Hawaiian Genealogies: Extracted from Hawaiian Language Newspapers, Vol. I & II", Kanalu G. Terry Young's; "Rethinking the Native Hawaiian Past", Charles Ahlo, Jerry Walker, and Rubellite Kawena Johnson's; "Kamehameha's Children Today", The Hawaiian Historical Society Reports, the genealogies of the Hawaiian Royal families in Kingdom of Hawaii probate, the works of Sheldon Dibble and David Malo as well as the Hawaii State Archive genealogy books.
(k) = Kane (Hawaiian for male or husband). (w) = Wahine (female or wife). Hawaiian genealogies use these as indicators for gender instead of (m) and (f)

Kauihi-a-Hiwa (k)	Kueluakawai (w)
Kealohi kanakamaikai (k)	Kaneiahaka (w)
Kainaaila (k)	Kapulauki (w)	Kauākahikua ʻanaʻauakāne (w)	Iwikauikaua (k)	Keakamahana (w)
Kauakahilau (k)	Kuluina (w)	Kāneikaiwilani (k)	Keākealaniwahine (w)	Kanaloakapulehu (k)	Ahu-a-ʻI (k)	Piʻilaniwahine (w)
Kamuokaumeheiwa (w)	Lonoikahaupu (k)	Kalanikauleleiaiwi (w)	Kauaua-a-Mahi (k)	Keaweʻīkekahi aliʻiokamoku (k)	Lonomaʻaikanaka (w)
Kaumeheiwa (k)	Kaʻapuwai (w)	Keawepoepoe (k)	Kūmaʻaikū (w)	Kanoena (w)	Haʻae-a-mahi (k)	Kekelakekeokalani (w)	Kalanikeʻeaumoku (k)	Kamakaimoku (w)	Kalaninuiamamao (k)
Kaeokulani (k)	Kamakahelei (w)	Kameʻeiamoku (k)	Kamakaʻeheikuli (w)	Keeaumoku; Pāpaiahiahi (k)	Nāmāhānaʻi Kaleleokalani (w)	Kamanawa (k)	Kekelaokalani (w)	Kekuʻiapoiwa II (w)	Keōua (k)	Kalola Pupuka (w)	Kalaniʻōpuʻu (k)
Kapuaamohu (w)	Kaumualii (k)	Kepookalani (k)	Alapai Wahine (w)	Keohohiwa (w)	Kaheiheimālie (w)	Namahana Piʻia (w)	Peleuli (w)	Kamehameha I (k)	Kekuiapoiwa Liliha (w)	Kīwalaʻō (k)
Kaʻahumanu (w)	Kalaʻimamahu (k)	Kahōʻanokū Kīnaʻu (k)	Wahinepio (w)	Palila Nohomualani (k)	Moana (w)	Keōpūolani (w)
Kinoiki Kekaulike (w)	Kūhiō Kalanianaʻole (k)	Kealiʻiahonui (k)	Kekauʻōnohi (w)	Levi Haʻalelea (k)	Eia (k)	Kauwā (w)
Kamanawa II (k) _{(c. 1785 – October 20, 1840)} (Note: Forbes-1998-p. 256 "Twelve days after the first Hawaiian Constitution was signed, a chief, Kamanawa II, grandfather of future monarchs David Kalakaua and Lydia Makaeha Liliuokalani, was hung for the murder of his wife. The method used was poison, and after a trial by jury, Kamanawa and Lonoapuakau (spelled Lonopuakau in title), captain of the Hawaiian vessel Hooikaika, were convicted. The sentence of death was set by the premier (Kekauluohi) and agreed upon by the king only after a long consultation with Commander Charles Wilkes of the United States Exploring Expedition. This is the printed order setting the date of execution for October 20, 1840.")	Kamokuiki (w) _{(died 1840)} (Note: Yalom-2008-p. 241 "Kamokuiki Died 1840")	ʻAikanaka (k) _{(died 1837)} (Note: Andrews-1865-p. 557 "1837. Aikanaka died.")	Kamaʻeokalani (w)	Iʻahuʻula (w)	Naihekukui (k)
Kapaakea (k) _{(1815 – November 13, 1866)} (Note: Forbes-1998-p. 428 "[Caesar Kapaakea] He died in Honolulu on November 13, 1866")	Keohokālole (w) _{(died April 6, 1869)} (Note: Stauffer-2004-p. 61 "[Keohokālole] died in Hilo on April 6, 1869.")	Kekāuluohi (w) _{(c. 1794 (Note: Kamehiro-2009- p. 61 "High Chiefess Kekāuluohi (ca. 1794–1845), premier, wife of Kamehameha I, and mother of King Lunalilo, built her house at this site, on the premises known as Pohukaina") – June 7, 1845 (Note: Kam - 2017- p.205 "Hawaiian Gazette lists “Kekauluohi, Mother of Lunalilo, died June 7, 1845."))}	Charles Kanaʻina (k) _{(May 4, 1798 – March 13, 1877)}	Kamāmalu (w) _{(c. 1802–1824)}	Kamehameha II (k) _{(c. 1797 – July 14, 1824)}	Kīnaʻu (w) _{(c. 1805 – April 4, 1839)}	Kekūanaōʻa (k) _{(c. 1791 – November 24, 1868)}	Kamehameha III (k) _{(March 17, 1814 – December 15, 1854)}	Kalama (w) (_{1817–September 20, 1870)}
Kapiʻolani (w) _{(December 31, 1834 – June 24, 1899)}	Kalākaua (k) _{(November 16, 1836 – January 20, 1891)}	Liliʻuokalani (w) _{(September 2, 1838 – November 11, 1917)}	John Owen Dominis (k) _{(March 10, 1832 – August 23, 1891)}	Lunalilo (k) _{(January 31, 1835 – February 3, 1874)}

== Bibliography ==
- Pitman, Almira Hollander (1931). After fifty years: an appreciation, and a record of a unique incident. Priv. print., The Plimpton press. OCLC 3703871.
- McKinzie, Edith Kawelohea (1986). Hawaiian Genealogies: Extracted from Hawaiian Language Newspapers - volume 2. University of Hawaii Press. ISBN 978-0-939154-37-1.
- Sahlins, Marshall (October 1996). How "Natives" Think: About Captain Cook, For Example. University of Chicago Press. ISBN 978-0-226-73369-2.
