= Anna Kaʻiulani =

Noble during the Kingdom of Hawaiʻi (born 1842)

- Born: 1842; Honolulu, Oʻahu, Kingdom of Hawaii
- Died: Unknown
- House: Kalākaua
- Father: Caesar Kapaʻakea
- Mother: Analea Keohokālole

Anna Kaʻiulani (born 1842) was a noble member of the House of Kalākaua during the Kingdom of Hawaii. Two of her siblings became ruling monarchs.

== Life ==
She was born in 1842 to the High Chiefess Analea Keohokālole and the High Chief Caesar Kapaʻakea. She was a younger sister of James Kaliokalani, David Kalākaua, and Lydia Kamakaʻeha, and the older sister of Kaʻiminaʻauao, Miriam K. Likelike and William Pitt Leleiohoku II. The name Kaʻiulani translates from the Hawaiian language as The Royal Sacred One.

She was, according to Hawaiian tradition of hānai, adopted by the Princess Kekauʻōnohi, who was the granddaughter of Kamehameha I, the royal governor of the island of Kauaʻi and foster mother of Abigail Maheha.

She died young, although the date and exact cause of death was never recorded. Her niece, Victoria Kaʻiulani (who shared her Hawaiian name) became Hawaii's crown princess but died aged twenty-three.

The exact site of burial is not known. She is not buried at the Royal Mausoleum at Mauna ʻAla in the Nuʻuanu Valley with her siblings and parents.

== Ancestry ==
- Kalākaua family tree
