= Keawemaʻuhili =

- Aliʻi Nui of Hilo
- Born: c. 1710
- Died: 1790; Hilo
- Spouse: ʻUlulani; Kekikipaʻa
- Issue: Kapiʻolani (chiefess); Keaweokahikiona; Elelule Laʻakeaelelulu; Koakanu
- House: House of Keawe
- Father: Kalaninuiamamao
- Mother: Kekaulike-i-Kawekiuonalani

Keawemaʻuhili (1710–1790) was an important member of the Hawaiian nobility at the time of the founding of the Kingdom of Hawaii.

He was a son of Kalaninuiamamao and his half-sister Kekaulike-i-Kawekiuonalani.

He first married Ululani, the Aliʻi Nui of Hilo, and then Kekikipaʻa, the daughter of Kameʻeiamoku and former wife of Kamehameha I. With his first wife he had sons Keaweokahikiona and Elelule Laʻakeaelelulu, and with his second wife, famous daughter Kapiʻolani (c. 1791) and son Koakanu.

His half-brother, King Kalaniʻōpuʻu, died in 1781. He fought his nephew Keōua Kūʻahuʻula in the Battle of Mokuʻōhai to fight Kamehameha I. He escaped the defeat and returned to Hilo.

In 1790, Keawemaʻuhili broke a pact of neutrality he agreed to with his nephew by sending troops and resources to aid Kamehameha I's war on Maui. In retaliation, Keōua Kūʻahuʻula waged war against Keawemaʻuhili and killed him at Alae in Hilopaliku.

Preceded by Ululani	Aliʻi Nui of Hilo; 1782-1790	Succeeded by Keōua Kuahuʻula
