= ʻAikanaka (father of Keohokālole) =

Hawaiian chief (died 1837)

- High Chief of Hawaii
- Died: 1837
- Spouse: Kamaʻeokalani; Mary Napuaelua; Kaiahua
- Issue: Analea Keohokālole; William Luther Moehonua
- House: Kalākaua
- Father: Kepoʻokalani
- Mother: Keohohiwa

ʻAikanaka (died 1837) was a high chief of the Kingdom of Hawaii and grandfather of two of Hawaii's future monarchs.

== Biography ==
His father was Chief Kepoʻokalani and his mother was Keohohiwa. His half-brother was Kamanawa II. The name literally means "man eater" in the Hawaiian language.

He was a grandson of two of the five Kona chiefs who supported Kamehameha I in his uprising against Kiwalaʻo: Kameʻeiamoku (one of the "royal twins" on the coat of arms of Hawaii) and Keawe-a-Heulu. His family was of high rank and were distant cousins of the House of Kamehameha. He was considered to be of the Keawe-a-Heulu line, his mother's line, and this line is what his grandchildren followed by.

He had one daughter, Keohokālole by Kamaʻeokalani, and probably one son, William Luther Moehonua by Mary Napuaelua. ʻAikanaka asked his servant Keaweamahi to take Napuaelua and son Moehonua. Moehonua later served as Governor of Maui, and other offices. His daughter Keohokālole by Kamaeokalani served as a member of the House of Nobles. His final wife was Alika Kuaiohua or Kaiahua.

He was listed amongst the members of the Council of Chiefs (ʻAha Aliʻi) of Kamehameha III. He was in charge of the Punchbowl gun battery and his home was under the Punchbowl hill. His compound included grass structures for cooking, eating, gathering, and retainers' quarters where his daughter gave birth to his two grandchildren: future Queen Liliʻuokalani and King Kalākaua.

He was the hānai (adoptive) father of his eldest grandson Kaliokalani. ʻAikanaka died in 1837. He owned vast tracts of land and they were split in half between his son and daughter, and then his daughter's in thirds to her remaining children.
