= Alapaʻiwahine =

Princess of Hawaii

Alapaʻi Wahine
- Spouse: Kepoʻokalani
- Issue: Kamanawa II; Kapelakapuokakae
- Father: Kalaninuiamamao
- Mother: Kaolanialii

Alapaʻiwahine was a princess of the Island of Hawaii and great-grandmother of King David Kalākaua and Queen Lydia Liliʻuokalani. She was a Naha chiefess: the product of a rare father and daughter marriage uncommon in Hawaiian history.

== Biography ==
She was probably born in the late 18th century prior to the landing of Captain James Cook on the Hawaiian Islands. She was born into the most powerful family in the island of Hawaii at the time. Her father was Kalaninuiamamao and her mother was his fifth wife, the Naha chiefess Kaolanialii, Kalaninuilamamao's daughter by his wife Kapaihi-a-Ahu.

Her father (who was thus also her grandfather) was ruling chief (Aliʻi Nui) of the District of Kaʻū, son of Keaweʻīkekahialiʻiokamoku and Lonomaʻaikanaka. He was once in line to succeed, but due to the contention between him and his higher-ranking brother, Keʻeaumoku Nui, which led to a war that split the island of Hawaiʻi into separate district kingdoms until Kamehameha I, Keʻeaumoku’s grandson, united it and the rest of the major islands. The war between the two brothers gave a chance for his cousin, the King Alapaʻi Nui, to take the throne. Alapaʻi was a common name of the Aliʻi family. Although her father lost the throne, her siblings soon regained power. Her brother Chief Kalaniʻōpuʻu a Kaiamamao ruled Kohala District, Kona District and Kaʻū which encompassed the western half of Hawaiʻi island; her brother Keawemauhili married high chiefess ʻUlulani of Hilo and became joint-ruler of Hilo alongside her.

She was the first cousin once removed of the King Kamehameha I. Her husband was the High Chief Kepoʻokalani, first cousin of Kamehameha, and they had two sons. Her sons were Kamanawa II (ca. 1785–1840) and Kapelakapuokakae. The House of Kalākaua descends from her son Kamanawa. Kamawana II is sometimes called Kamanawa ʻŌpio (meaning "younger" or "junior" in the Hawaiian language).
