= Keohohiwa =

Hawaiian chiefess

- Spouse: Kepoʻokalani
- Issue: ʻAikanaka
- House: Kalākaua
- Father: Keaweaheulu
- Mother: Ululani

Keohohiwa (fl. 19th century) was a Hawaiian chiefess during the formation of the Kingdom of Hawaii.

== Life ==
Her father was Keawe-a-Heulu, the chief warrior and councillor of Kamehameha I, who assisted him to overthrow his cousin Kiwalaʻo and unite the eight separate islands of Hawaii into one Kingdom of Hawaii. Her mother was Ululani, the aliʻi of Hilo and the most celebrated poet of her days.

Her brother was Naihe, the councillor and chief orator of Kamehameha I and husband of Chiefess Kapiʻolani (c. 1781–1841) who helped Christian missionaries by renouncing the goddess Pele.

Keohohiwa married Chief Kepoʻokalani, son of Kameʻeiamoku, one of the royal twins. She had one son ʻAikanaka from her husband. Through her son she was great-grandmother of Kalākaua and Queen Liliʻuokalani.
