= Keawe-a-Heulu =

Hawaiian high chief

- Died: 1804; Kaʻaʻawa, Koʻolauloa, Oahu
- Burial: Royal Mausoleum of Hawaii
- Spouse: Ululani
- Issue: Naihe; Keohohiwa
- Father: High Chief Heulu
- Mother: High Chiefess Ikuaʻana

Keaweaheulu Kaluaʻapana (sometimes Keawe-a-Heulu, died 1804) was a Hawaiian high chief and maternal great-grandfather of King Kalākaua and Queen Liliʻuokalani. He was among Kamehameha I's council of chiefs and was one of the Five Kona chiefs.

He was known as a High Chief of the Waiʻanae district of the island of Oʻahu. His father was the High Chief Heulu, descendant of the ʻĪ family of Hilo, and his mother the High Chiefess Ikuaʻana, descendant of the Mahi family of Kohala. He was also cousin to Kamehameha's father Keōua Nui. His father was the half-brother of Kamakaimoku, the grandmother of Kamehameha I. He assisted Kamehameha in the overthrow of his cousin Kīwalaʻō, and then as his strategist and general in his campaigns. In 1791 he assisted Kamehameha in defeating Keōua Kuahuʻula the chief of Kaʻū and Puna. Kamehameha had summoned him and gave him this order: "Go to Keōua Kuhauʻula and tell him that great is my desire to make friends. You are the best one to bear the message, for you are related to his mother, and he will heed your words sooner than anything I could say to him." Keaweaheulu on arrival at Kaʻū made known his errand and at once hastened to Keōua's camp. The chief consented to become friends and boarded a canoe with him back to Kona and Kawaihae. When he arrived at the Puʻukoholā Heiau Keōua was killed as a sacrifice by Kamehameha, uniting the Big Island for the first time since the days of Keaweʻīkekahialiʻiokamoku.

In 1794, Keawe-a-Heulu was one of the six principal chiefs under Kamehameha I and ruled the district of Kaʻū in his name. He died in 1804 on Oahu of the ʻOkuʻu pestilence, which was said to resemble cholera. He was the last of Kamehameha's five Kona chiefs to die. Their sons succeeded to their father's post; his son Naihe took his positions in Kamehameha's council of chiefs.

He married Ululani, chiefess of Hilo, and had a son and a daughter. His son Naihe succeeded him as councilor to Kamehameha, also serving as chief orator, and married Chiefess Kapiʻolani; Naihe is believed to have descendants to this day, although not with Kapiʻolani. His daughter Keohohiwa married Kepoʻokalani and mothered ʻAikanaka, the grandfathers of Kalākaua and Liliuokalani, and the House of Kalākaua claimed their high ranks from the Keawe-a-Heulu line. His family originally had the right to care for the remains of Kamehameha I but because they had not kept the secrecy of his father Keoua's burial place, the task of hiding the remains of the conqueror king was given to Hoapili and his brother Hoolulu.
