= Kamanawa II =

Hawaiian high chief (c.1785–1840)

- Born: c. 1785
- Died: October 20, 1840; Honolulu
- Spouse: Kamokuiki; Aulani (lover)
- Issue: Caesar Kaluaiku Kapaʻakea; Kekahili (disputed); Joel Hulu Mahoe
- Father: Kepoʻokalani
- Mother: Alapaiwahine

Kamanawa II known as Kamanawa ʻŌpio or Kamanawa ʻElua (c. 1785 – October 20, 1840) was a Hawaiian high chief and grandfather of the last two ruling monarchs of the Kingdom of Hawaii, King David Kalākaua and Queen Lydia Makaeha Liliʻuokalani. His family had a good reputation until 1840, when he was convicted of murdering his wife.

== Life ==
=== Family ===
Kamanawa was born about 1785. His father was High Chief Kepoʻokalani. He was a grandson of Kameʻeiamoku, one of the five Kona chiefs who supported Kamehameha I in his formation of the Kingdom, one of the royal twins on the coat of arms of Hawaii. His mother was High Chiefess Alapaʻi Wahine.

His half-brother was ʻAikanaka.

He was named after his great-uncle Kamanawa, the twin of his grandfather. Sometimes he is called Kamanawa ʻŌpio or ʻElua because ʻōpio means "junior" and ʻelua means "second" in the Hawaiian language. He had son Caesar Kaluaiku Kapaʻakea (1815–1866) and daughter Chiefess Kekahili (c. 1830) by Kamokuiki. He was known to live in the Keahuolū area of the North Kona district of the island of Hawaiʻi.

=== Death ===
He began to hear rumors that his great-uncle Alapai was the true father of Kekahili. Meanwhile, he had a son Joel Hulu Mahoe (1831–1891) by Aulani. He had divorced his wife Kamokuiki, but he could not legally remarry while his former wife lived. Punishment for adultery in missionary-influenced Hawaii included banishment to the barren island of Kahoʻolawe.

He and an accomplice, Lonoapuakau, captain of the Hawaiian vessel Hooikaika, poisoned Kamokuiki to avoid punishment for adultery, but were discovered. The trial, October 3, 1840, was presided over by Governor Kekūanaōʻa of Oʻahu and a jury of twelve "intelligent Hawaiians". Kamanawa was found guilty of both murder and adultery. The same issue of the newspaper that expressed approval of the trial welcomed Charles Wilkes of the American Exploring Expedition.

On October 20, 1840, he and Lonopuakau were hanged at Fort Honolulu before a crowd of 10,000. Kamanawa died twelve days after the first Hawaiian Constitution was signed. Prior to his death, he requested to see his grandsons James Kaliokalani and David Kalākaua, who were attending the Royal School. They were allowed to see their grandfather before his execution.
