= Haʻae-a-Mahi =

High chief of the island of Hawaiʻi

Haʻae was a High Chief (Aliʻi) of the island of Hawaiʻi.

Haʻae was a son of the Chiefess Kalanikauleleiaiwi and her husband Kauaua-a-Mahi, son of Mahiolole, the great Kohala chief of the Mahi family. Haʻae had a brother called Alapainui ("Alapai the Great") and sister Kekuʻiapoiwa I who became a Chiefess of Maui.

Haʻae was an uncle of Chief Kahekili II of Maui and Chief Keōua of Hawaiʻi.

Haʻae‘s wife was Haʻae‘s half-sister Kekelakekeokalani and they had daughter, Kekuʻiapoiwa II, who was mother of Kamehameha I.

Haʻae was an ancestor of kings—Kamehameha I, Kamehameha II and Kamehameha III.

== Family tree ==
Monarch birth-ascension-(reign end-)death
Haʻae
Kekuiapoiwa II
Kamehameha I 1758-1782-1819
Kekāuluohi; 1795–1885	Kamehameha II; 1797-1819-1824	Kīnaʻu; 1805–1839
Lunalilo; 1835-1873-1874	Kamehameha IV; 1834-1855-1863	Kamehameha V 1830-1836-1872

Kalanikauleleiaiwi; 17th–18th centuries
Kanoena
Kameʻeiamoku ?-1802
Kepookalani
Kamehameha III; 1813-1824-1854	Keohokālole; 1816–1869
Kalākaua; 1836-1874-1891	Liliuokalani; 1838-1891-1893-1917
