= Kamokuiki =

Hawaiian royal (c.1795–1840)

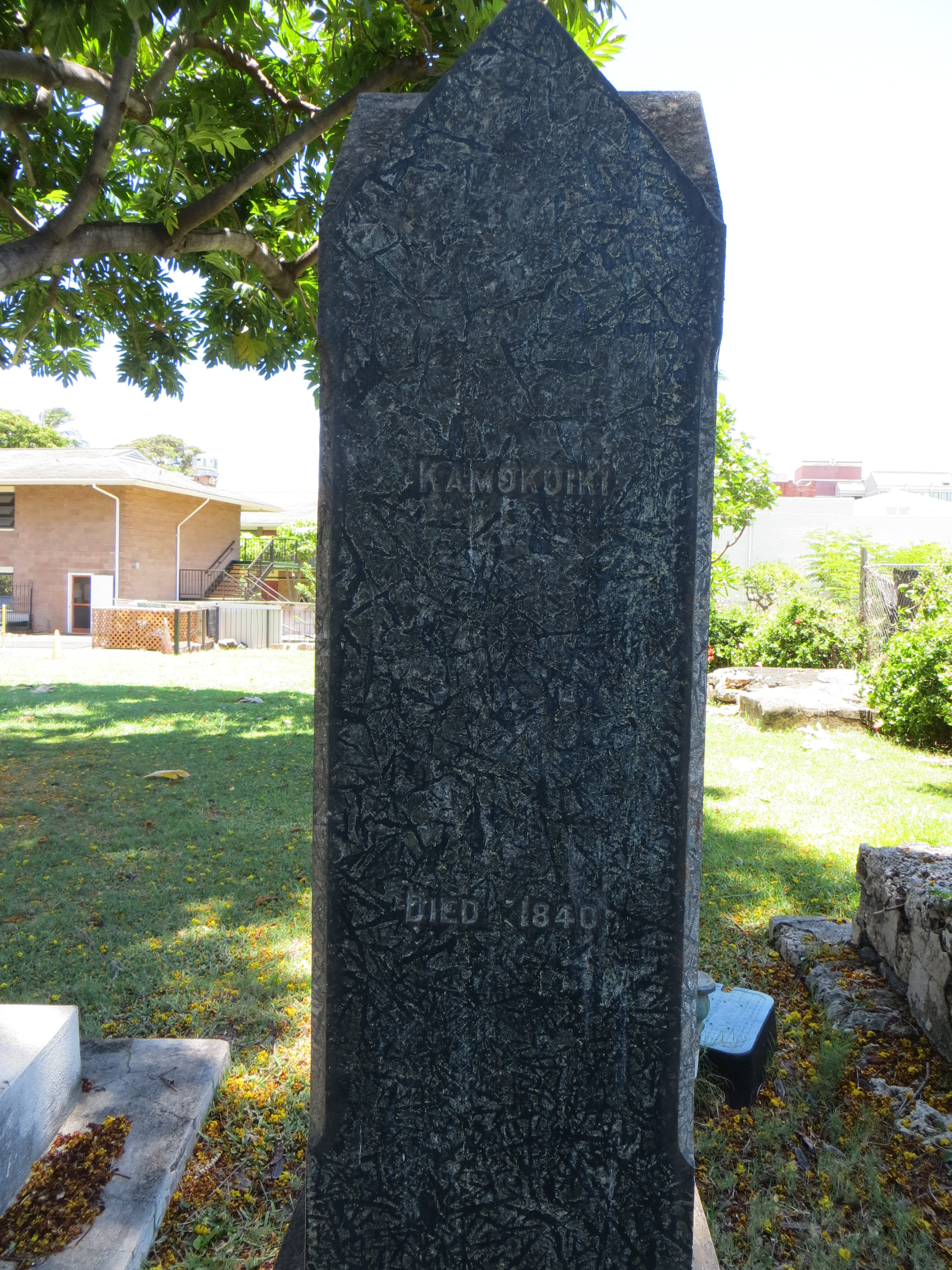
- Grave marker at the Kawaiahaʻo Cemetery
- Born: c. 1795
- Died: September 26, 1840; Honolulu
- Burial: Kawaiahaʻo Church
- Spouse: Alapai-maloiki; Kamanawa II
- Issue: Kapaʻakea; Kekahili
- Father: High Chief Kanepawale
- Mother: High Chiefess Uaua

Kamokuiki (c. 1795 – September 26, 1840) was a grandmother of the last two ruling monarchs of the Kingdom of Hawaii.

== Life ==
Kamokuiki was born about 1795 as a daughter of the chief Kanepawale, son of Kaʻihelemoana and Kaʻopa, and his wife chiefess Uaua, daughter of Kaʻehunuiamamaliʻi and Koʻi. Her grandfather's sister was Hikuikekualono, the mother of Kahaopulani, who according to legend hid and nursed the baby Kamehameha I during his infancy when he was being hunted down by Alapainui.

Kamokuiki married High Chief Kamanawa II and with him had a son, Caesar Kapaʻakea (1815–1866). She also had a daughter named Kekahili by another husband named Alapaimaloiki. The House of Kalākaua descends from her son Kapaʻakea. The House of Kawānanakoa descends from her daughter Kekahili.

After converting to Christianity, Kamokuiki grew disgusted at her husband Kamanawa's many affairs. In 1840, she divorced him for the crime of adultery. Kamanawa was not allowed to remarry while she was alive. Six weeks after the divorce, Kamokuiki died in Honolulu on September 26, 1840. Two days later an autopsy was performed on her body and her stomach was discovered to be "much inflamed, while everything else was in order." Her ex-husband and his accomplice Lonoapuakau were arrested and placed in chains. They had poisoned her "‘awa" (a name for kava, a narcotic drink) with fatal doses of the fishing poisons ʻākia and ʻauhuhu. They were both tried by a jury of twelve chiefs and found guilty of her murder. They were hanged in the Honolulu Fort on October 20, 1840, the first two to be prosecuted under the criminal laws adopted in the Hawaiian constitution of 1840. Charles Wilkes of the United States Exploring Expedition was in Honolulu during the murder and subsequent trial. Calling her "Kamakinki", Wilkes recounted how the cries of the natives mourning the death of Kamokuiki kept him awake at night, describing it as "one of the most startling and mournful sounds I ever heard which lasted all night, and disturbed the whole town of Honolulu."

This incident left a mark on the family and would negatively affect public opinion of Kamokuiki's grandson Kalākaua during his campaign for the throne in 1874. Later opponents of Kalākaua and his sister and successor Liliʻuokalani would use the murder case as an example of their family's idolatrous tendencies.

Kamokuiki's remains are interred in the cemetery of the Kawaiahaʻo Church, in the Kapiʻolani family plot. Her husband Alapaimaloiki, Kūhiō Kalanianaʻole, the father of Queen Kapiʻolani, and other relatives of Elizabeth Kahanu Kalanianaʻole are also buried here. Today, an obelisk marks where the Kapiʻolani family plot is located. Most of her royal descendants are buried at the Royal Mausoleum at Mauna ʻAla.

== Bibliography ==
- Alexander, William DeWitt (1894). Kalakaua's Reign: A Sketch of Hawaiian History. Honolulu: Hawaiian Gazette Company. OCLC 16331580.
- Cooke, Amos Starr; Cooke, Juliette Montague (1937). Richards, Mary Atherton (ed.). The Chiefs' Children School: A Record Compiled from the Diary and Letters of Amos Starr Cooke and Juliette Montague Cooke, by Their Granddaughter Mary Atherton Richards. Honolulu: Honolulu Star-Bulletin. OCLC 1972890.
- Gutmanis, June (1974). "Law ... Shall Punish All Men Who Commit Crime". Hawaiian Journal of History. 8. Honolulu: Hawaiian Historical Society: 143–145l. hdl:10524/526.
- Wilkes, Charles (1844). Narrative of the United States Exploring Expedition During the Years 1838, 1839, 1840, 1841, 1842. Vol. 4. Philadelphia: C. Sherman.
