= Lonomaʻaikanaka =

Ancient Hawaiian queen consort

Lonomaʻaikanaka was a Queen consort of Hawaii island in ancient Hawaii, and High Chiefess of Hilo by birth. She was also a High Chiefess of Maui.

== Family ==
Lonomaʻaikanaka was a daughter of High Chief Ahu-a-ʻĪ, belonging to the powerful ʻĪ family of Hilo, and his wife, Piʻilaniwahine II, the daughter of King Kalanikaumakaowākea of Maui. She was first married to High Chief Hulu and bore him two children. First born was High Chief Kekahimoku (aka Kekohimoku) and second born was High Chiefess Kauhiokaka (aka Kauhiokeka). See also Kumuhonua, Hawai’i State Archives.

Lomoma'aikanaka married secondly to King Keaweʻīkekahialiʻiokamoku and their son was Kalaninuiamamao.

Kauhiokaka, daughter of Lonoma'aikanaka and Hulu, had issue with her step-father Keaweʻīkekahialiʻiokamoku and become the mother of Kekaulike-i-Kawekiuonalani, who would marry her half-uncle & half-sibling, Kalaninuiamamao.

Lonoma’aikanaka was grandmother and great-grandmother of Keawemauhili. Lonoma’aikanaka was also great-grandmother of Chiefess Kapiolani, who accepted Christianity.

The senior or elder line of descent of Lonoma'aikanaka are the descendants of Kekahimoku, progenitor the House of Unauna. Kekahimoku was paternal great great grandfather of high chiefess of Lahaina, Lucy Kapōhaiali'iokamāmalu Koi'i Unauna. Via her second son Kalaninuiamamao and also via her daughter Kauhiokaka,

Pedigree of Lonomaaikanaka

16. High Chief Kanaloaikaiwilenakapulehu
8. Keaweʻīkekahialiʻiokamoku of Hawaiʻi
17. Keakealaniwahine of Hawaii
4. Prince Kalaninuiamamao of Hawaiʻi, Chief of Kau
18. High Chief Ahu-a-Iʻ of Hilo
9. High Chiefess Lonomaaikanaka
19. Princess Piʻilaniwahine of Maui
2. Keawemauhili of Hilo
20. High Chief Kanaloaikaiwilenakapulehu
10. Keaweʻīkekahialiʻiokamoku of Hawaiʻi
21. Keakealaniwahine of Hawaiʻi
5. Kekaulike-i-Kawekiuonalani of Hawaiʻi
22. High Chief Hulu
11. High Chiefess Kauhiokaka
23. Lonomaʻaikanaka
1. Chiefess Kapiʻolani
6. High Chief Kameʻeiamoku
3. Kekikipaa
7. one of his wives (uncertain which)
