= Kapiʻolani (chiefess) =

High Chiefess of Ka'ū and South Kona (c. 1781–1841)

- High Chiefess of Ka'ū and South Kona
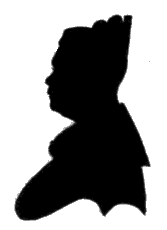
- Silhouette by Persis Goodale Thurston Taylor, 1839
- Born: c. 1781; Hilo, Hawaii
- Died: May 5, 1841; Honolulu
- Spouse: High Chief Naihe (others?)
- Father: Keawemauhili, Aliʻi Nui of Hilo
- Mother: High Chiefess Kekikipaʻa

High Chiefess Kapiʻolani (c. 1781–1841) was an important member of the Hawaiian nobility at the time of the founding of the Kingdom of Hawaiʻi and the arrival of Christian missionaries. She was one of the first Hawaiians to read and write, as well as sponsor of a church. She made a dramatic display of her new faith, which was the subject of a poem by Alfred, Lord Tennyson.

== Ancestry ==
Every high chief in the Hawaiian Islands was related to her, including Kamehameha I, who was both her second cousin and her third cousin through different relations. Her ancestors included royalty of Kauaʻi, royalty of Maui and the royalty of Hawaiʻi island. The name probably comes from ka pi'o lani meaning "heavenly arch" in the Hawaiian language.

The father of Kapiʻolani was Keawemauhili, who was high chief (Aliʻi Nui) of the district of Hilo on the island of Hawaiʻi. She was probably born there about 1781. Keawemauhili was half-brother to Kalaniʻōpuʻu who was king of the island during the fatal visit of Captain James Cook in 1779. Her mother was his second wife Kekikipaʻa, daughter of Kameʻeiamoku, who had fled with from her first husband Kamehameha I to Hilo in order to marry Keawemauhili. She was a first cousin of Kiwalaʻo, the young king of the island who was killed when Kamehameha I first came to power at the battle of Mokuʻōhai in July 1782.

== Life ==
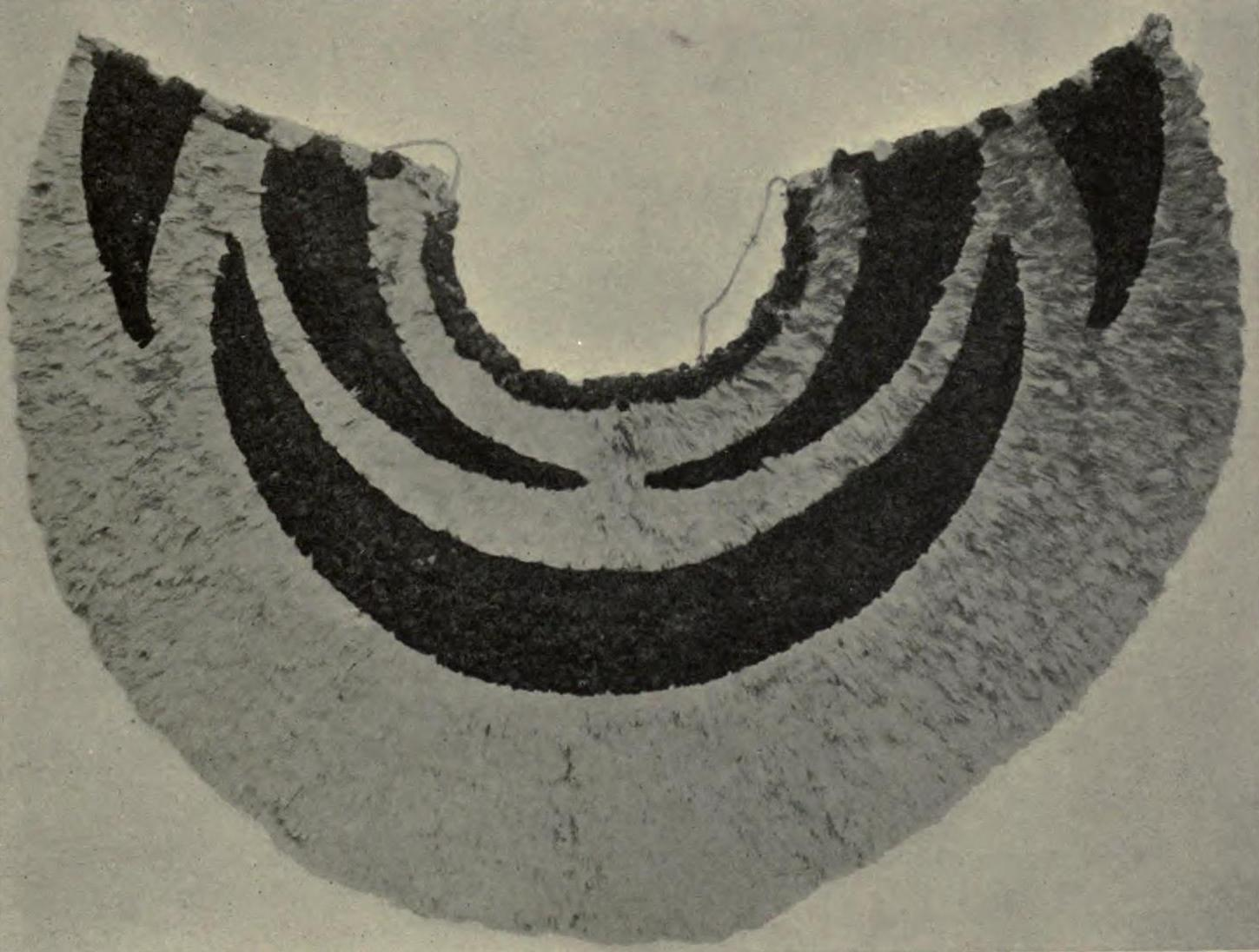
The ʻahuʻula (feather cape, reserved for royalty) of Kapiolani, Bishop Museum

After a quiet period of a few years, the civil wars continued in 1790. Her father Keawemauhili joined forces with Kamehameha, but was then killed by his nephew Keōua Kuahuʻula. The young Kapiʻolani was thrown in the bushes by her caretakers as the army fled, but was saved and sent to live with her aunt Akahi in the village of Kealia in the Kona District near the religious centers on Kealakekua Bay. She was instructed in the Hawaiian religion and its strict social rules known as kapu. For example, women were not allowed to eat bananas. Once she sent a servant boy to secretly get some for her to taste. When the local priest found out, she was spared but the boy was sacrificed.

She was still a young girl when the Vancouver Expedition arrived at Kealakekua Bay in 1793 and 1794. This time, through interpreters, Hawaiians could start to learn about other cultures. In 1805, an epidemic known as mai oku'u broke out. Much of the royalty, including Kamehameha I and Kapiʻolani got very sick. She might have briefly married High Chief Chief Kuakini, who later became the royal governor of the island. She became known as having liaisons with several members of the ruling class.

The death of Kamehameha in 1819 put the kingdom into turmoil. The period known as ʻAi Noa (literally, "free eating") after one king's death was traditionally followed by the new king imposing similar Kapu rules. However, this time, powerful women such as Queen Kaʻahumanu (then Regent), Keōpūolani (mother of the new King Kamehameha II), along with Kapiʻolani, were not satisfied with the old ways. Chief Keaoua Kekuaokalani attempted to gather followers of the old system at the temple near where she was living, but he was defeated at the battle of Kuamoʻo.

American Christian Missionaries led by Rev. Asa Thurston arrived only a few months later, in March 1820 at Kailua-Kona about 12 miles (19 km) to the north. They had already embarked on the ship Thaddeus before Kamehameha's death. They describe meeting Kapiʻolani for the first time as she was sunbathing while applying coconut oil, "basking in the noonday tropical sun, like a seal". They also describe finding her "with her two husbands, all nearly nude, and in a state of beastly intoxication".

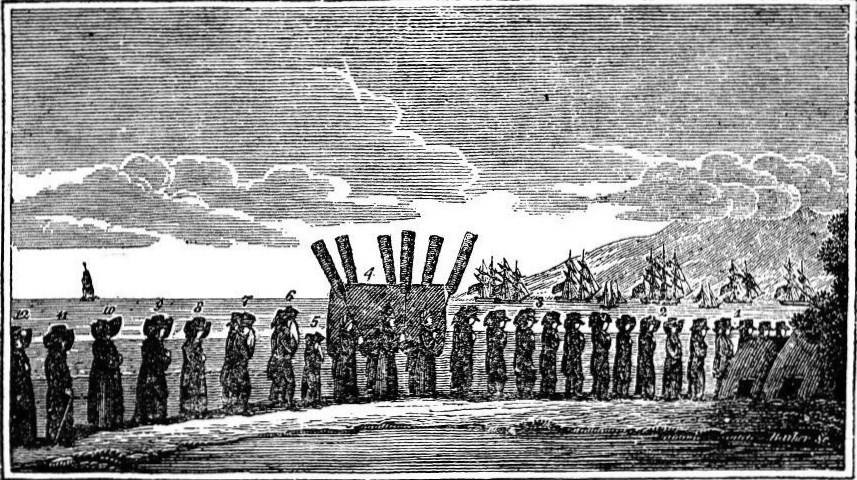
Kapiʻolani and Naihe, at the rear of the funeral procession of Queen Keōpūolani, 1823.

She followed the missionaries to Honolulu in 1821, where a school had been set up. She quickly learned to read and write and settled into a monogamous relationship with her husband Naihe (her stepbrother, since her father married his mother). She returned to Kealakekua Bay in the spring of 1823, but wanted to continue her education. She would send boats up to Kailua to pick up a preacher for Sunday services.

In the summer of 1823 William Ellis toured the island to determine locations for mission stations, and identified Kapiʻolani and Naihe as "friends and patrons of missionary efforts". Because of this, he suggested the village of Kaʻawaloa at the north end of Kealakekua Bay as one of the first sites for a church. Later on the tour, after a long journey to the volcano Kīlauea with little food, Ellis eagerly ate the wild berries they found growing there. The berries of the ʻŌhelo (Vaccinium reticulatum) plant were considered sacred to the goddess Pele, who lived in the volcano according to Hawaiian mythology. Traditionally prayers and offerings to Pele were always made before eating the berries. The volcano crater was an active lava lake, which the natives feared was a sign that Pele was not pleased with the violation.

In February 1824 Kapiʻolani constructed a thatched house about 60 feet (18 m) by 30 feet (9.1 m) for use as a church, and Rev. James Ely starting using it for services in April. Although other leaders had tolerated the missionaries, this was the first time a major noble had constructed a building specifically for them.

== Challenging Pele ==
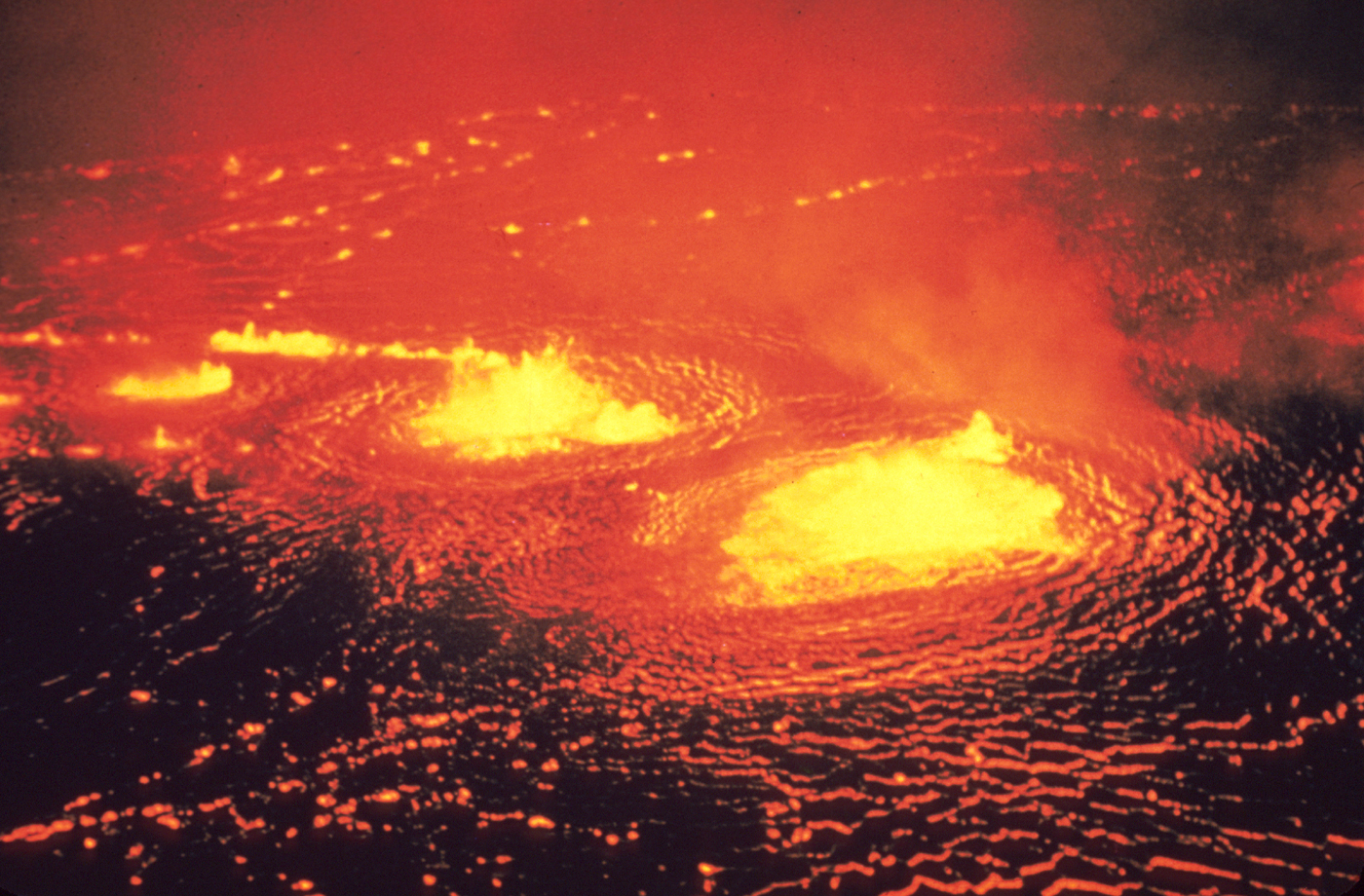
Molten lava in Kīlauea

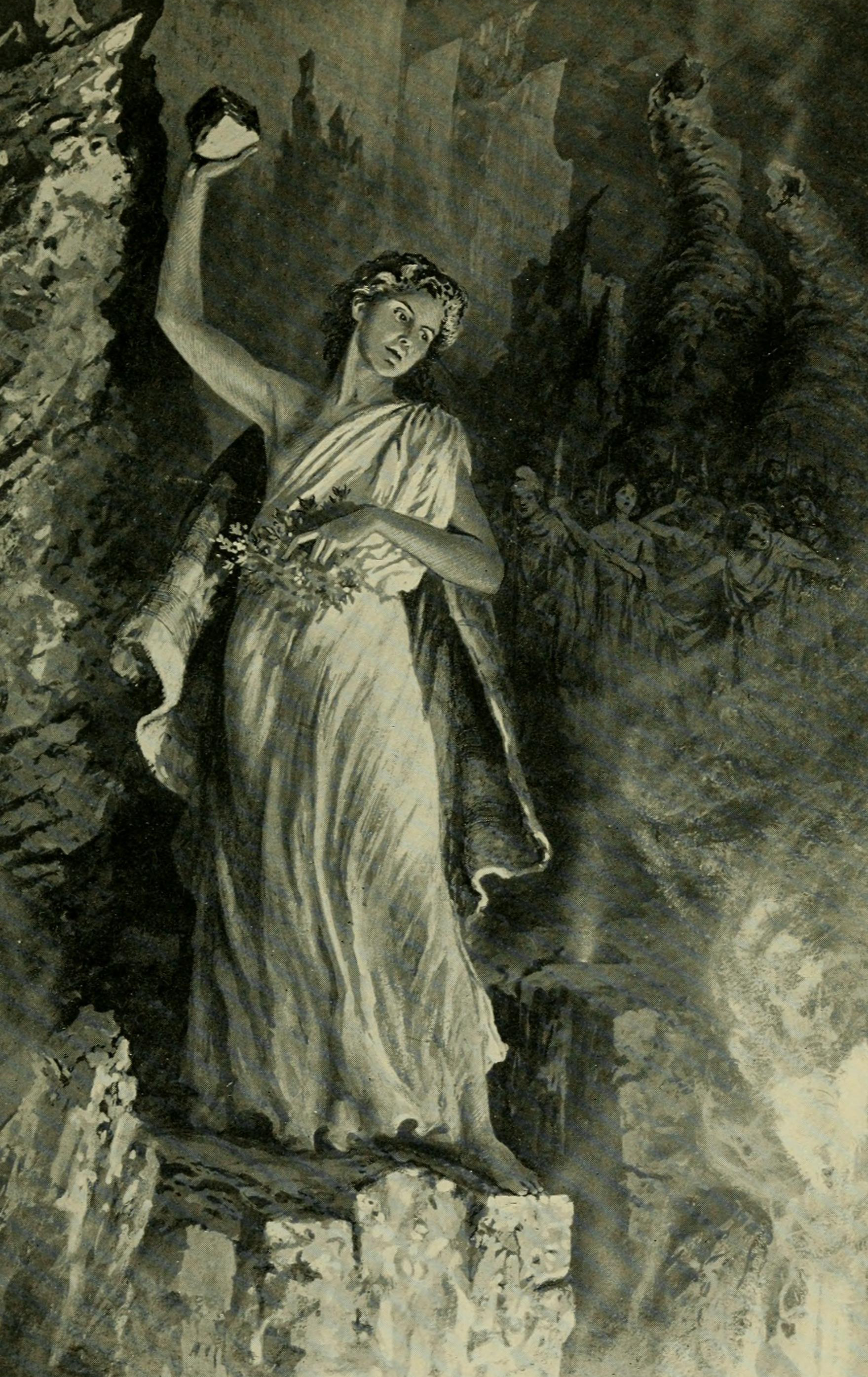
Book illustration of Kapiʻolani defying Pele

In the fall of 1824 she decided to show her people a dramatic demonstration of her faith.

Although many other temples were destroyed by this time, the native Hawaiians continued to honor the goddess Pele at Kīlauea, which was still active. Following the example of the Ellis trip, she traveled to the volcano. Because of the sharp, barren lava rock on the way, it would have been much faster to use canoes. However, she set out on foot, gathering a large crowd as she walked about sixty miles. Rev. Goodrich from the Hilo mission met her at the volcano near the end of December. The guardians of Pele warned that if she did not make the customary offerings, she would certainly be killed. Many remembered when their relatives were wiped out by an explosive eruption in 1790. She said a Christian prayer instead of the traditional one to Pele, and descended about 500 feet down into the main vent of Halemaʻumaʻu. There was a molten lava lake at the time, but no eruption and she survived intact, with only bruises on her feet from the long journey. This event has become legendary at the volcano. Whilst on the volcano, she defied Pele by breaking a taboo of eating ʻŌhelo berries without offering any to Pele, as was custom. Instead she told her onlookers that if she returned without being destroyed by Pele in the volcano, they must abandon their worship of Pele and instead worship the Christian God.

In July 1825, Admiral Lord Byron (cousin of the famous poet) brought back the bodies of Kamehameha II and Queen Kamāmalu who had died in England. Naihe traveled to Honolulu and helped negotiate the peaceful transition in which the 11-year-old Prince Kauikeaouli would be named Kamehameha III, but power would be held again by Queen Kaʻahumanu. Naihe led Byron back to Kealakekua Bay, where his crew looted many artifacts from the temples that remained in the area.

In October 1825 Kapiʻolani was baptized. Commanding the respect of the people, she kept order in her districts of south Kona and Kaʻū, and often traveled to help the less fortunate. This was very different than the strict isolation of the upper classes that was the tradition in ancient Hawaii. She is described as not being "hard and puritanical" but rather having a "nature-loving spirit". Rev. Samuel Ruggles became pastor of the church in 1828. He found the shoreline areas too hot, so Kapiʻolani offered some land at a higher elevation and a few miles inland to build a house. It was near the present town of Captain Cook, an area formerly used to grow taro called Kuapehu. USS Vincennes visited Kealakekua Bay in 1829 and she hosted the officers at her home. The ship chaplain, Rev. Charles Stewart, was a former missionary to Hawaii who had met Kapiʻolani in 1823.

In 1829, she was saddened to find the destruction of the temples included desecrating the bones of her ancestors at the Puʻuhonua o Hōnaunau. She removed the remains of the old chiefs and hid them in the Pali Kapu O Keōua cliffs. She then ordered this last temple to be destroyed. The bones were kept hidden safely until they were moved to the Royal Mausoleum of Hawaii in 1858.

Naihe died December 29, 1831, and Kapiʻolani moved uphill to live near the missionaries. She became friends with Persis Goodale Thurston Taylor (daughter of Asa and Lucy Goodale Thurston) who sketched a silhouette in 1839. She started a garden, experimenting with various plants, including guava, oranges, and coffee. This area is now known as the center for growing Kona coffee. In 1839 missionary Cochran Forbes started to build a massive stone church on more of her land. The site was kepulu, just uphill from the current village of Napoʻopoʻo, since the village of Kaʻawaloa was mostly abandoned.

In about 1840 she developed breast cancer. In March 1841 she traveled to Honolulu for surgery by Dr. Gerrit P. Judd (without anesthetic). She recovered, and was preparing to leave when she died on May 5, 1841. She was buried in a royal plot in Honolulu.

Chiefess Kapiʻolani Elementary School

Location
- 966 Kilauea Avenue; Hilo, Hawaiʻi 96720
- Coordinates: 19°42′48″N 155°4′41″W

Information
- Type: Public
- Grades: K–6
- Enrollment: 402
- Campus type: Outdoor
- Athletics conference: Big Island Interscholastic Federation
- Accreditation: Western Association of Schools and Colleges
- Affiliation: State of Hawaii

== Legacy ==
The massive stone church would fall into ruin, but be rebuilt several times. Now known as Kahikolu Church, it is still in use today.

The "Chiefess Kapiʻolani Elementary School" is named for her. As of 2008 enrollment was 402 students. The school is located at 966 Kilauea Avenue in Hilo, Hawaii.

The story of Kapiʻolani became very popular in the middle of the 19th century. The British author Alfred, Lord Tennyson (1809–1892) wrote a poem about her, published after his death by his son. Verse IV, for example reads:

Long as the lava-light
Glares from the lava-take,
Dazing the starlight;
Long as the silvery vapor in daylight,
Over the mountain

Floats, will the glory of Kapiolani be mingled with either on Hawa-i-ee.

Her nephew Kūhiō Kalanianaʻole named his daughter after her, who became known as Queen Kapiʻolani (1834–1899) when her husband became King Kalākaua. This namesake would in turn lend her name to several notable institutions in Hawaii.

== See also ==
- List of Missionaries to Hawaii
- List of Kapiʻolani namesakes

Ancestors of Kapiʻolani

16. High Chief Kanaloaikaiwilenakapulehu
8. Keaweʻīkekahialiʻiokamoku of Hawaiʻi
17. Keakealaniwahine of Hawaiʻi
4. Prince Kalaninuiamamao of Hawaii, Aliʻi Nui of Kaʻū
18. High Chief Ahu-a-Iʻ of Hilo
9. High Chiefess Lonomaaikanaka of Hilo
19. Princess Piʻilaniwahine of Maui
2. High Chief Keawemauhili of Hilo
20. High Chief Kanaloaikaiwilenakapulehu
10. Keaweʻīkekahialiʻiokamoku of Hawaiʻi
21. Keakealaniwahine of Hawaiʻi
5. Princess Kekaulikeikawekiuonalini of Hawaiʻi
22. High Chief Hulu
11. High Chiefess Kauhiokaka
23. High Chiefess Lonomaʻaikanaka of Hilo
1. High Chiefess Kapiʻolani
24. High Chief Lonoikahaupu of Kauaʻi
12. High Chief Keawepoepoe
25. Princess Kalanikauleleiaiwi of Hawaiʻi
6. High Chief Kameʻeiamoku
26. High Chief Lonoikahaupu of Waimea
13. High Chiefess Kanoena
27. Princess Kalanikauleleiaiwi of Hawaiʻi
3. High Chiefess Kekikipaʻa
7. one of his wives (uncertain which)
