= Keaweʻōpala =

Keaweʻōpala is the first born son of Alapainui (the usurping aliʻi nui of Hawaii Island) and his wife Keaka, who cared for Kamehameha the Great in his youth along with her sister Hākau. He would inherit his father's position after being named heir by Alapainui shortly before his death.

His was a short rule of just 1 year beginning around 1754. He was overthrown by Kalaniʻōpuʻu.

Keaweʻopala would father a child with Moana Wahine, named Kalaimanokahoʻowaha also known as Kanaʻina, who would be taken into the new king's court to serve as a royal attendant as a new aliʻi line of secondary chiefs serving the supreme ruler of the island and the kingdom. Kanaʻina would cohabitate with his half sister from his mother Moana Wahine, Hākau. Her father was Heulu. The couple would have a child named Hao, the grandson of Keaweʻopala. Hao's daughter was Luahine. Luahine's daughter was Kōnia, who was the mother of Bernice Pauahi Bishop, the three times great granddaughter of Keaweʻopala.

With Namoe he had a son Kanekoa. With Keoua he had a daughter Peleuli. With Kaukuhakuonana he had two sons Kanehiwa and Kuapuu. Kanehiwa married a cousin named Kaulunae and were the parents of Lipoa and Julia Moemalie. Kanekoa's grandson was Joseph Heleluhe, who was the private secretary of Queen Liliuokalani.
