= Joseph Heleluhe =

Hawaiian nobleman (1855–1900)

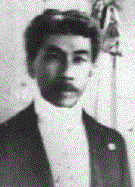
- Born: Joseph Hewahewa Kaimihakulani Heleluhe; June 2, 1855; Kapoho, Puna, Hawaiʻi, Kingdom of Hawaii
- Died: July 8, 1900 (aged 45); Honolulu, Oʻahu, Territory of Hawaii
- Resting place: Kawaiahaʻo Church
- Education: Hilo Boarding School
- Occupation: Secretary of Liliʻuokalani
- Spouse: Wakeke Ululani Heleluhe
- Children: Jack Heleluhe; Myra Heleluhe Iona
- Parent(s): Heleluhe and Kanoa

Joseph Hewahewa Kaimihakulani Heleluhe (June 2, 1855 – July 8, 1900) was a member of the Hawaiian nobility who served as a retainer and private secretary of Queen Liliʻuokalani, the last monarch of the Kingdom of Hawaii, and accompanied her on her trips to the United States and Washington, D.C., from 1896 to 1900 to prevent the American annexation of Hawaii.

== Life ==
=== Early life ===
He was born on June 2, 1855, on the island of Hawaiʻi. English language newspapers claimed he was a native of Kaʻū while the Ke Aloha Aina, a Hawaiian language newspaper, claimed he was born in Kapoho, Puna. His parents were Heleluhe and Kanoa. He had four known sisters: Keoki, Kaioewa, Kanoa, and Ana. From his mother Kanoa, he descended from Alapaʻinui and his son Keaweʻōpala, the kings of the island of Hawaiʻi prior to the accession of Kalaniʻōpuʻu. His father was possibly the same individual as J. H. Heleluhe, who served in the legislature of the kingdom as a member of the House of Representatives for the district of Puna during the legislative assembly of 1855, 1862, 1864, 1866 and 1867.

He attended the local schools in the Puna district and later studied at the Hilo Boarding School under American missionary David Belden Lyman. After finishing his education, he did physical labor in the district of Kaʻū for a time before going to Honolulu to serve King Kalākaua.

=== Service to the Hawaiian monarchy ===
After coming to Honolulu, Heleluhe worked as a retainer for the royal family. He served King Kalākaua as an under-secretary. He also worked as a steward for Kalākaua's sister and successor Liliʻuokalani, and accompanied her to the leper settlement at Kalaupapa on Molokai in 1891. He steadily rose in rank until he was appointed her private secretary in 1896. In 1892. Heleluhe was nominated as a National Reform Party candidate for the House of Representatives for Oʻahu's first ward. He lost this election. After the overthrow of the monarchy in 1893, Heleluhe and his wife Wakeke Ululani remained loyal to the royalist cause and supported the deposed Queen Liliʻuokalani. Following the outbreak of the unsuccessful 1895 Counter-Revolution, Heleluhe was arrested, held as a political prisoner, and temporarily imprisoned by forces loyal to the Republic of Hawaii in order for him to "disclose the queen's treachery." Queen Liliʻuokalani, who was also imprisoned in the former ʻIolani Palace, described the ordeal Heleluhe had to endure in her 1898 memoir Hawaii's Story by Hawaii's Queen:

Mr. Heleluhe was taken by the government officers, stripped of all clothing, placed in a dark cell without light, food, air, or water, and was kept there for hours in hopes that the discomfort of his position would induce him to disclose something of my affairs. After this was found to be fruitless, he was imprisoned for about six weeks; when, finding their efforts in vain, his tormentors released him. No charge was ever brought against him in any way, which is true of about two hundred persons who were similarly confined.

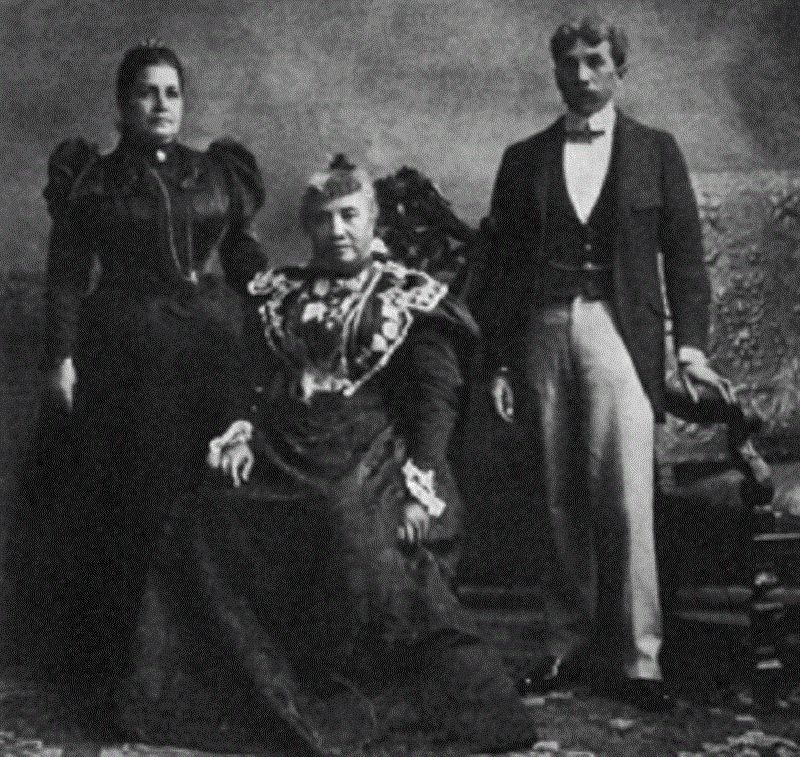
The Queen with Joseph Heleluhe and her lady-in-waiting Elizabeth Kia Nahaolelua, c. 1896–97

Between 1896 and 1900, Heleluhe accompanied Queen Liliʻuokalani on her many trips abroad to the United States and Washington, D.C., to campaign against the American annexation of Hawaii and then assisted her in her attempts to reclaim the crown land after 1898. Initially, Elizabeth Kia Nahaolelua was chosen to be her lady-in-waiting but after the trips were extended, Heleluhe's wife Wakeke replaced her in the royal party as lady-in-waiting to the queen. From 1897 to 1898, Heleluke was also actively involved in rallying Hawaiians in signing the Kūʻē Petitions and petitioning against annexation. In 1897, he wrote to US President William McKinley and Secretary of State John Sherman with the petitions collected by Hui Aloha ʻĀina (Hawaiian Patriotic League) and Hui Kālaiʻāina (Hawaiian Political Association).

Following Liliʻuokalani's return to Hawaii in 1900, the 45-year-old Heleluhe succumbed to tuberculosis, on July 8, 1900. When it became evident his death was near, his final request was to die at Washington Place. Although he expired before arrival at the queen's residence, his funeral was held there. He was buried at the Kawaiahaʻo Church cemetery.

== Family ==
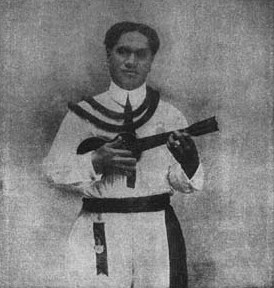
"Prince" Jack Heleluhe, 1914

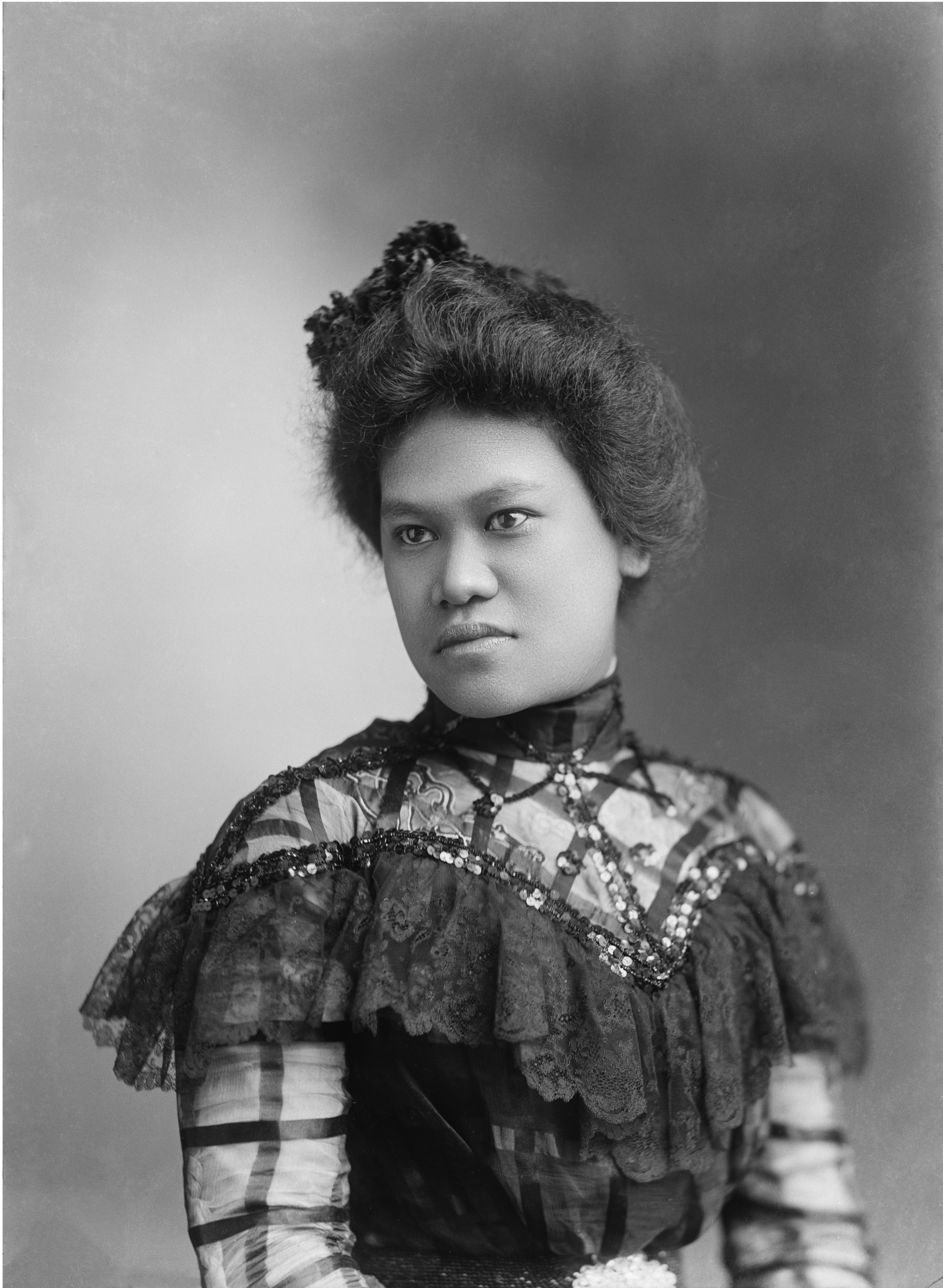
Myra Kailipanio Heleluhe, c. 1890s

Heleluhe married Wakeke Ululani Heleluhe, from Maui, who served as a lady-in-waiting to Queen Liliʻuokalani. They had two children: Jack Paokalani Heleluhe (1880–1958) and Myra Kailipanio Heleluhe Iona (1879–1934). Jack, also known as "Prince Jack Heleluhe", worked as a musician and member of the Royal Hawaiian Band; he became one of the first musicians to play Hawaiian music in the United States and was featured on N. B. Bailey's 1914 book A Practical Method for Self Instruction on the Ukulele and Banjo Ukulele. Myra, sometimes referred to as Heleluhe's stepdaughter, became a protège of the queen at a young age and accompanied her to Washington, D.C., with her family. She later served as an associate of Princess Elizabeth Kahanu Kalanianaʻole and Prince Jonah Kūhiō Kalanianaʻole.

In 1906, Wakeke lost favor with the queen after an attempt to discredit Lydia Kaʻonohiponiponiokalani Aholo, the queen's hānai daughter, backfired, and she was evicted from the houses she occupied at Washington Place and the queen's residence in Waikiki by the queen and her financial agent Joseph O. Carter. The reasons given for the queen's anger was Wakeke's "disloyalty to me and dishonesty"; she had lied to Aholo that the queen never wished to see her again. She may have later reconciled with the queen because Wakeke and Onaʻala were listed as two of her old retainers at the deathbed of the queen. She, her daughter Myra and Lahilahi Webb stood vigil by Liliʻuokalani's casket while her body laid in the Royal Mausoleum prior to her final interment in the vault of the Kalākaua Crypt. Wakeke died at her Honolulu home, on November 21, 1921.
