= Frank Funk =

Frank Funk may refer to:

- Francis Funk, Hawaiian military adjutant general
- Frank H. Funk (1869–1940), U.S. Representative from Illinois
- Frank Funk (baseball) (born 1935), American Major League Baseball pitcher
- Frank Funk, member of the National Sprint Car Hall of Fame
