= Joel Hulu Mahoe =

Hawaiian pastor and missionary (1831–1891)

- Born: December 31, 1831; South Kona, island of Hawaii
- Died: January 23, 1891 (aged 59); Koloa, Kauai
- Spouse: Elizabeth Olivia (Libbie) Kale
- Children: 11
- Parent(s): Kamanawa II and Aulani

Joel Hulu Mahoe (1831–1891) was a noted Hawaiian pastor and missionary and half-uncle of two of Hawaii's future monarchs, King Kalākaua and Queen Liliʻuokalani.

== Early life ==
Mahoe was born about December 31, 1831, at Opihihale in the South Kona district on the island of Hawaii. His father was Chief Kamanawa II and mother was Aulani. He was a great-grandson of Kameʻeiamoku, one of the five Kona chiefs who supported Kamehameha I in his founding of the Kingdom of Hawaii, one of the royal twins on the coat of arms of Hawaii. His half-brother was Kaluaiku Kapaakea by his father's first wife Kamokuiki. His half-sister was Kekahili, the daughter of Kamokuiki and Chief Alapai, from which the House of Kawānanakoa descends.

His family was of high rank. In 1840 his father murdered his wife Kamokuiki because Kamanawa II was angry when he found out his wife Kamokuiki had daughter Kekahili with another man. Due to the influence of the conservative American missionaries, Judge John Papa ʻĪʻī and Queen Kaʻahumanu, he had been prevented from remarrying. Kamanawa Elua was convicted and hanged.

== Career ==
Mahoe converted at an early age to Christianity and was given the name Joel by Rev. David Belden Lyman of the Hilo mission. He was a devout follower of his new faith. Unlike his brother who took up politics, he became a missionary. He was called a patient and dedicated minister. He, along with Kanoa, started out as one of Hiram Bingham II's Hawaiian assistants. He worked as the delegate of the Hawaiian Board to the Gilbert Islands. On November 10, 1857, they landed on Abaiang (then spelled Apaiang, part of the country of Kiribati) in the Gilbert group with their wives.

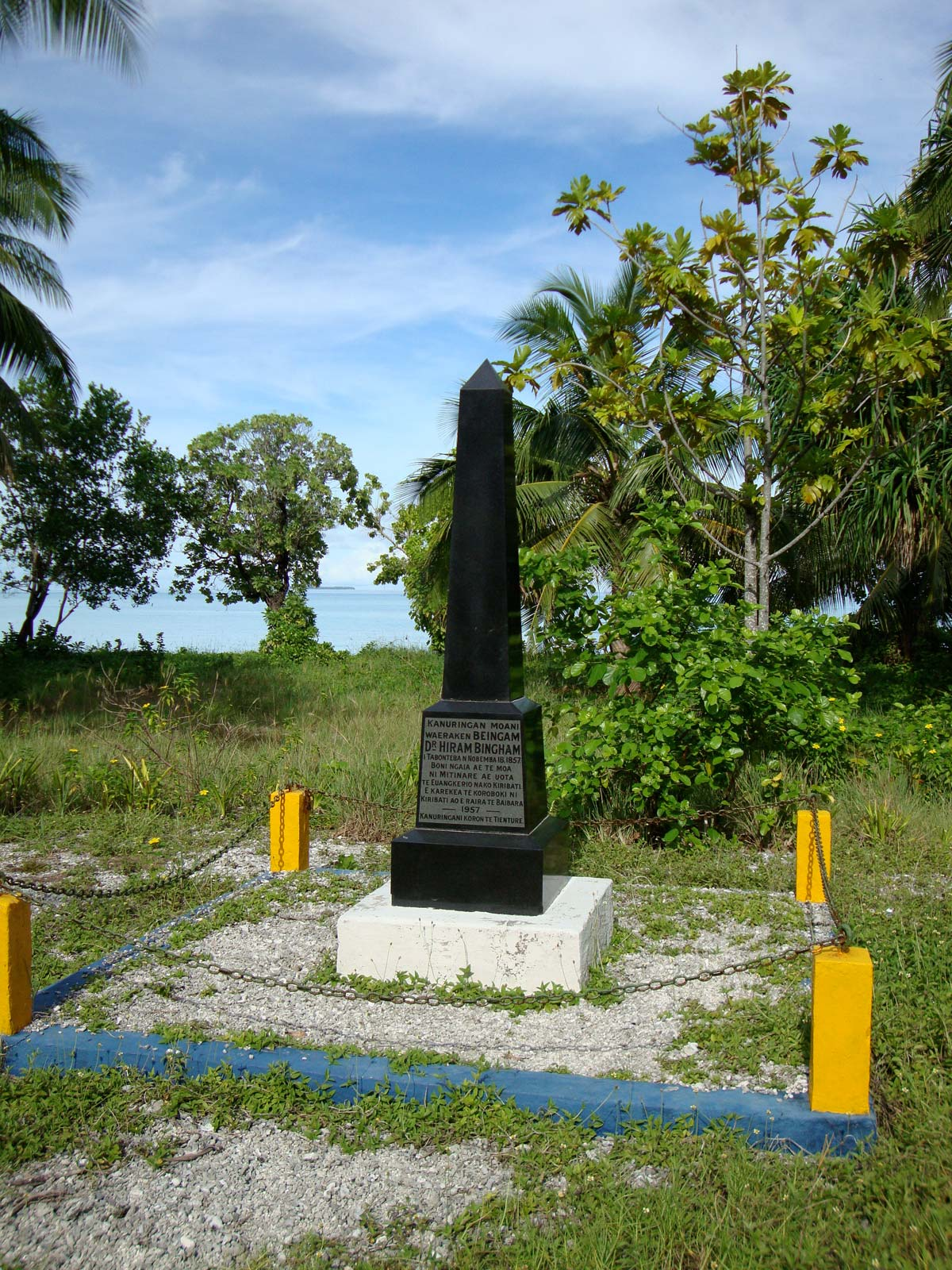
Monument in Koinawa for the arrival of Christian missionaries in 1857

In March 1869, Mahoe, who had been left in charge of Abaiang by Bingham, was shot and severely wounded by one of a rebels.

The rebellion seems to have arisen, in part at least, from an attempt of the king (of whose Christian character the missionaries had good hope) to enforce a code of laws against murder, theft, adultery and other crimes. The mission houses were destroyed and the cocoanut trees around them cut down. Yet the mission seems to have gained a hold on the islands of Tarawa, Butaritari, Makin, Tapiteuea, and the adverse occurrences at Apaiang may yet turn out for the furtherance of the Gospel.

This wound disabled him and brought him back to Hawaii before returning and finishing his work in the Gilbert Islands until blindness and old age forced him to retire.

After many years in the South Pacific, he returned home again. There his nephew had become the King. He was known to have assisted the Gilbertese immigrants to Kauai. Mahoe tried his best to preserve the souls and bodies of the unhappy Gilbertese. He was stationed at Kilauea, although he tried to assist all the Gilbertese on other islands since he was able to speak their language and was familiar with their customs. In his report to the Hawaiian Evangelical Association for 1880, he estimated 391 South Pacific Islanders on Kauai, with 113 at Kilauea. During the year, consumption, pneumonia, and dysentery had killed 34, and Mahoe worried about the damage being done by liquor, opium, and gambling, as well as the inroads made by the Mormons.

Reverend Mahoe, for twelve years a missionary to the Gilbert Islands, and, subsequently, for more than twenty years a Hawaiian pastor, died at his post in Koloa, Kauai, January 23, 1891. He was buried in the Koloa Hawaiian Church at Koloa, Kauai.

== Family life ==
In 1854 he married Elizabeth Olivia (Libbie) Kale. She was born at Lahaina, Maui October 16, 1840; she was the daughter of a Hawaiian Chief named Charles Kameeiamokuakeauiaole Mahoe aka Chief Kale, by his wife, Maria Koloakea. She followed her husband to the Gilbert Islands like most of the missionary wives. On the island of Tarawa she taught and formed a promising class of pupils. She and Mahoe had eleven children total.

1. Ruth Aulani Mahoe, born 1861 in Tarawa married the Reverend Louis Murie Mitchell; they had five children.
2. Marietta Mahoe, was born in Honolulu, Oahu, and died as a young child on the Morning Star.
3. Mary Koloakea Mahoe, born 1866 at Honolulu married John Keoua Kalanikau Piimoku Haalou.
4. Martha Kaumaka Mahoe who was also born in Honolulu and died at the age of 18 at Kawaiahao Seminary and later taken back to Koloa Hawaiian Church and buried next to her parents.
5. Abigail Kekulani Mahoe, their fourth daughter, begotten at Tarawa and born c. 1870 married James A. Harper of England and had two daughters Miss Emily Aulani Harper of Waianae, Oahu and Alice Kahalemalihinikalei Harper of Kapaa Kauai. Mrs. Abigail Kekulani Harper was buried at the Waianae Protestant Church in Waianae, Oahu.
6. Son Joel Hulu Mahoe Jr. known as Joel Hapa was cared for by his sister Abigail Kekulani Mahoe and her husband James A. Harper ("Hapa" for Harper).
7. Son Benjamin Hulu Mahoe, born at Kiribati, September 30, 1878 and married Henrietta Kaaialii and later married Helen Akau.
8. Son Joseph Kahoohuli Mahoe born c. 1872 lived and died in Kaʻū, Hawaii.

Other children that died young were Maria Mahoe, Luukia Mahoe, and another daughter who was still born.
