= Kalākaua =

King of Hawaii from 1874 to 1891

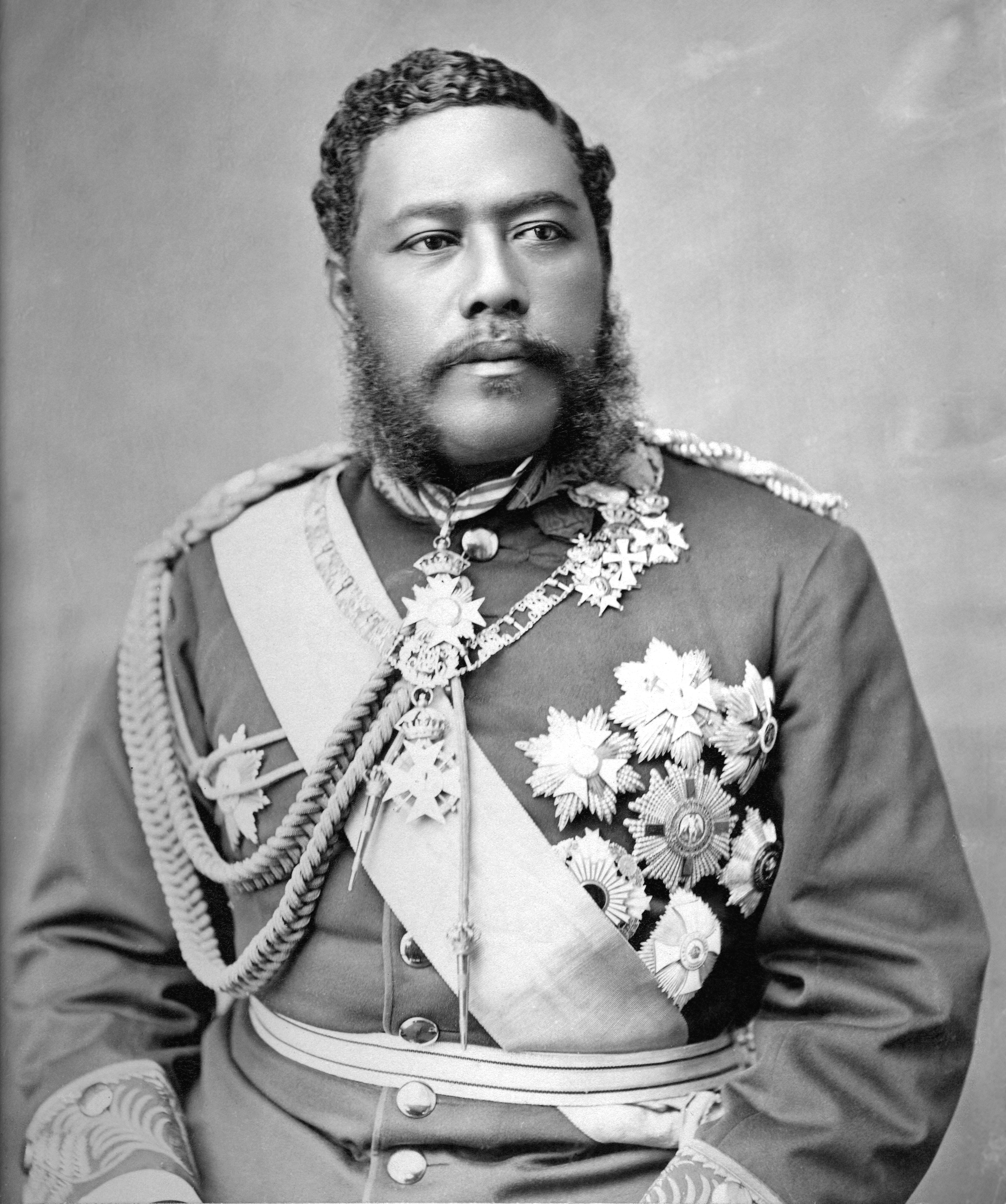
- 1882 portrait

King of the Hawaiian Islands
- Reign: February 12, 1874 – January 20, 1891
- Proclamation: February 13, 1874, Kīnaʻu Hale
- Coronation: February 12, 1883, ʻIolani Palace, Honolulu
- Predecessor: Lunalilo
- Successor: Liliʻuokalani
- Prime Minister: William L. Green; Walter M. Gibson
- Born: November 16, 1836; Honolulu, Kingdom of Hawai'i
- Died: January 20, 1891 (aged 54); San Francisco, California, U.S.
- Burial: February 15, 1891; Mauna ʻAla Royal Mausoleum
- Spouse: Kapiʻolani (m. 1852)
Names
- David Laʻamea Kamanakapuʻu Māhinulani Nālaʻiaʻehuokalani Lumialani Kalākaua
- House: House of Kalākaua
- Father: Caesar Kapaʻakea
- Mother: Analea Keohokālole
- Religion: Church of Hawaii

Kalākaua (David Laʻamea Kamanakapuʻu Māhinulani Nālaʻiaʻehuokalani Lumialani Kalākaua; November 16, 1836 – January 20, 1891) was the last king and penultimate monarch of the Kingdom of Hawaiʻi, reigning from February 12, 1874, until his death in 1891. Succeeding Lunalilo, he was elected to the vacant throne of Hawaiʻi against Queen Emma. Kalākaua was known as the Merrie Monarch for his convivial personality—he enjoyed entertaining guests with his singing and ukulele playing. At his coronation and his birthday jubilee, the hula, which had hitherto been banned in public in the kingdom, became a celebration of Hawaiian culture.

During Kalākaua's reign, the Reciprocity Treaty of 1875 brought great prosperity to the kingdom. Its renewal continued the prosperity but allowed the United States exclusive use of Pearl Harbor. In 1881, Kalākaua took a trip around the world to encourage the immigration of contract sugar plantation workers. He wanted Hawaiians to broaden their education beyond their nation. He instituted a government-financed program to sponsor qualified students to be sent abroad to further their education. Two of his projects, statue of Kamehameha I and the rebuilding of ʻIolani Palace, were expensive but are popular tourist attractions today.

Extravagant expenditures and Kalākaua's plans for a Polynesian confederation played into the hands of annexationists who were already working toward a United States takeover of Hawaiʻi. In 1887, Kalākaua was pressured to sign a new constitution that made the monarchy little more than a figurehead position. After his brother William Pitt Leleiohoku II died in 1877, the king named their sister Liliʻuokalani as heir-apparent. She acted as regent during his absences from the country. After Kalākaua's death, she became the last monarch of Hawaiʻi.

== Early life and family ==
Kalākaua was born at 2 a.m. on November 16, 1836, to Caesar Kaluaiku Kapaʻakea and Analea Keohokālole in his maternal grandfather ʻAikanaka's grass hut compound at the base of Punchbowl Crater in Honolulu on the island of Oʻahu. Of the aliʻi class of Hawaiian nobility, his family was considered collateral relations of the reigning House of Kamehameha, sharing common descent from the 18th-century aliʻi nui Keaweʻīkekahialiʻiokamoku. From his biological parents, he descended from Keawe-a-Heulu and Kameʻeiamoku, two of Kamehameha I's five royal counselors during his conquest of the Hawaiian Kingdom. Kameʻeiamoku, the grandfather of both his mother and father, was one of the royal twins, alongside Kamanawa, depicted on the Hawaiian coat of arms. But Kalākaua and his siblings traced their high rank from their mother's line of descent, calling themselves members of the "Keawe-a-Heulu line", though later historians called the family the House of Kalākaua. The second surviving child of a large family, his biological siblings included his elder brother James Kaliokalani and younger siblings Lydia Kamakaʻeha (later renamed Liliʻuokalani), Anna Kaʻiulani, Kaʻiminaʻauao, Miriam Likelike, and William Pitt Leleiohoku II.

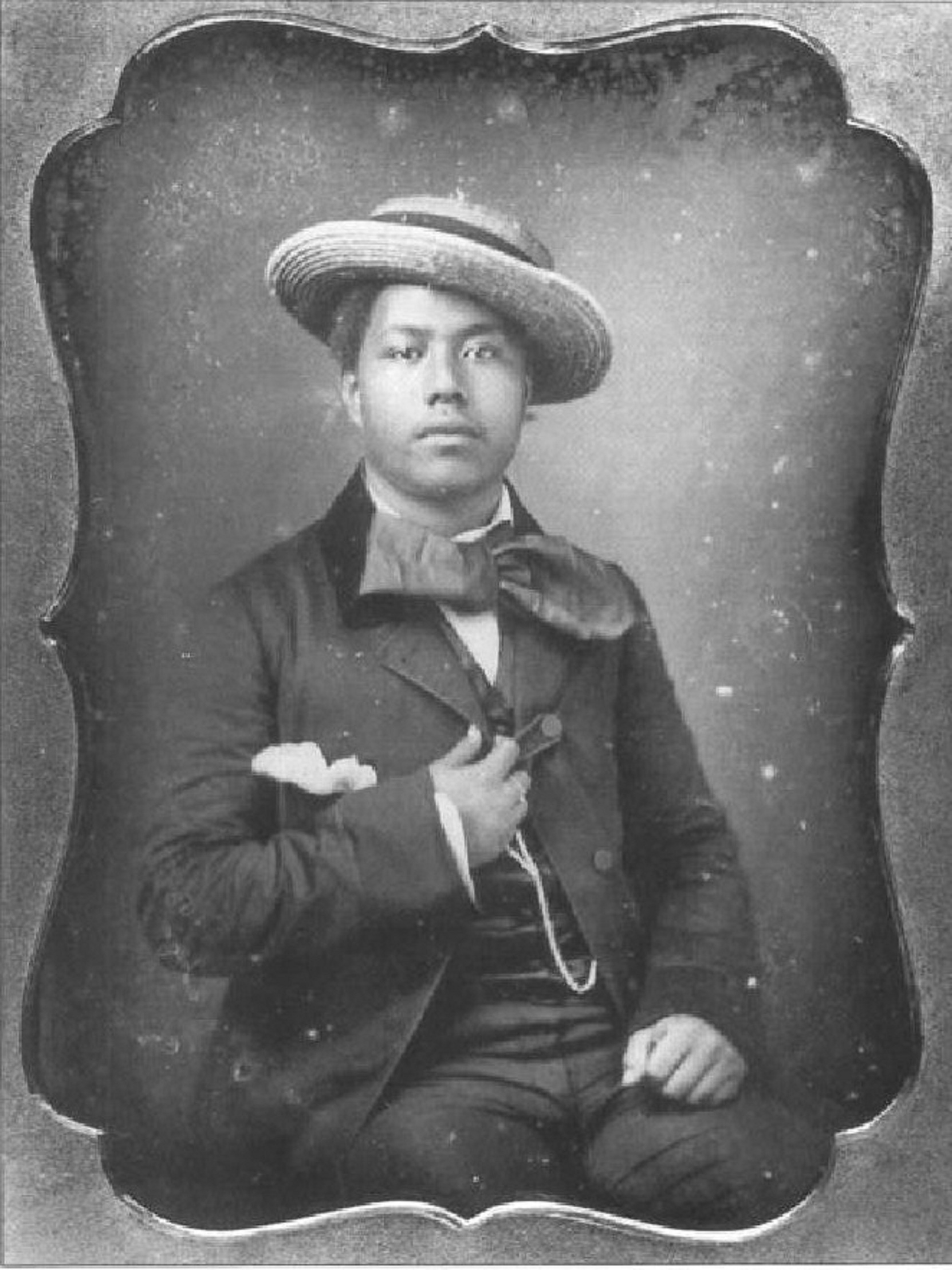
Kalākaua at the age of fourteen, c. 1850

Kalākaua, whose name means "The Day [of] Battle", was born on the day the unequal treaty imposed by British Captain Lord Edward Russell of the Actaeon on Kamehameha III was signed. He and his siblings were hānai (informally adopted) to other family members in the Native Hawaiian tradition. Before his birth, his parents had promised to give their child in hānai to Kuini Liliha, a high-ranking chiefess and the widow of High Chief Boki. But after he was born, High Chiefess Haʻaheo Kaniu took the baby to her home at Honuakaha, one of the king's residences. Kuhina Nui (regent) Elizabeth Kīnaʻu, who disliked Liliha, deliberated and decreed that his parents give him to Haʻaheo and her husband Keaweamahi Kinimaka. When Haʻaheo died in 1843 she bequeathed all her properties to him. After Haʻaheo's death, his guardianship was entrusted to his hānai father, a chief of lesser rank; he took Kalākaua to live in Lāhainā on the island of Maui. Kinimaka later married Pai, a subordinate Tahitian chiefess, who treated Kalākaua as her own until the birth of her own son.

== Education ==
At the age of four, Kalākaua returned to Oʻahu to begin his education at the Chiefs' Children's School (later renamed the Royal School). He and his classmates had been formally proclaimed by Kamehameha III as eligible for the throne of the Kingdom of Hawaiʻi. His classmates included his siblings James Kaliokalani and Lydia Kamakaʻeha and their 13 royal cousins, including the future kings Kamehameha IV, Kamehameha V, and Lunalilo. They were taught by American missionary Amos Starr Cooke and his wife, Juliette Montague Cooke. At the school, Kalākaua became fluent in English and the Hawaiian language and was noted for his fun and humor rather than his academic prowess. The strong-willed boy defended his less robust elder brother Kaliokalani from the older boys.

In October 1840, their paternal grandfather Kamanawa II requested that his grandsons visit him on the night before his execution for the murder of his wife Kamokuiki. The next morning the Cookes allowed the royal children's guardian, John Papa ʻĪʻī, to bring Kaliokalani and Kalākaua to see Kamanawa for the last time. It is not known whether their sister was also taken to see him. Later sources, especially biographies of Kalākaua, say the boys witnessed their grandfather's public hanging at the gallows. Historian Helena G. Allen noted the Cookes' indifference to the request and the traumatic effect it must have had on the boys.

After the Cookes retired and closed the school in 1850, Kalākaua briefly studied at Joseph Watt's English school for native children at Kawaiahaʻo and later joined the relocated day school (also called Royal School) run by Reverend Edward G. Beckwith. Illness prevented him from finishing his schooling and he was sent back to Lāhainā to live with his mother. After his formal schooling, he studied law under Charles Coffin Harris in 1853. Kalākaua appointed Harris as Chief Justice of the Supreme Court of Hawaii in 1877.

== Political and military careers ==
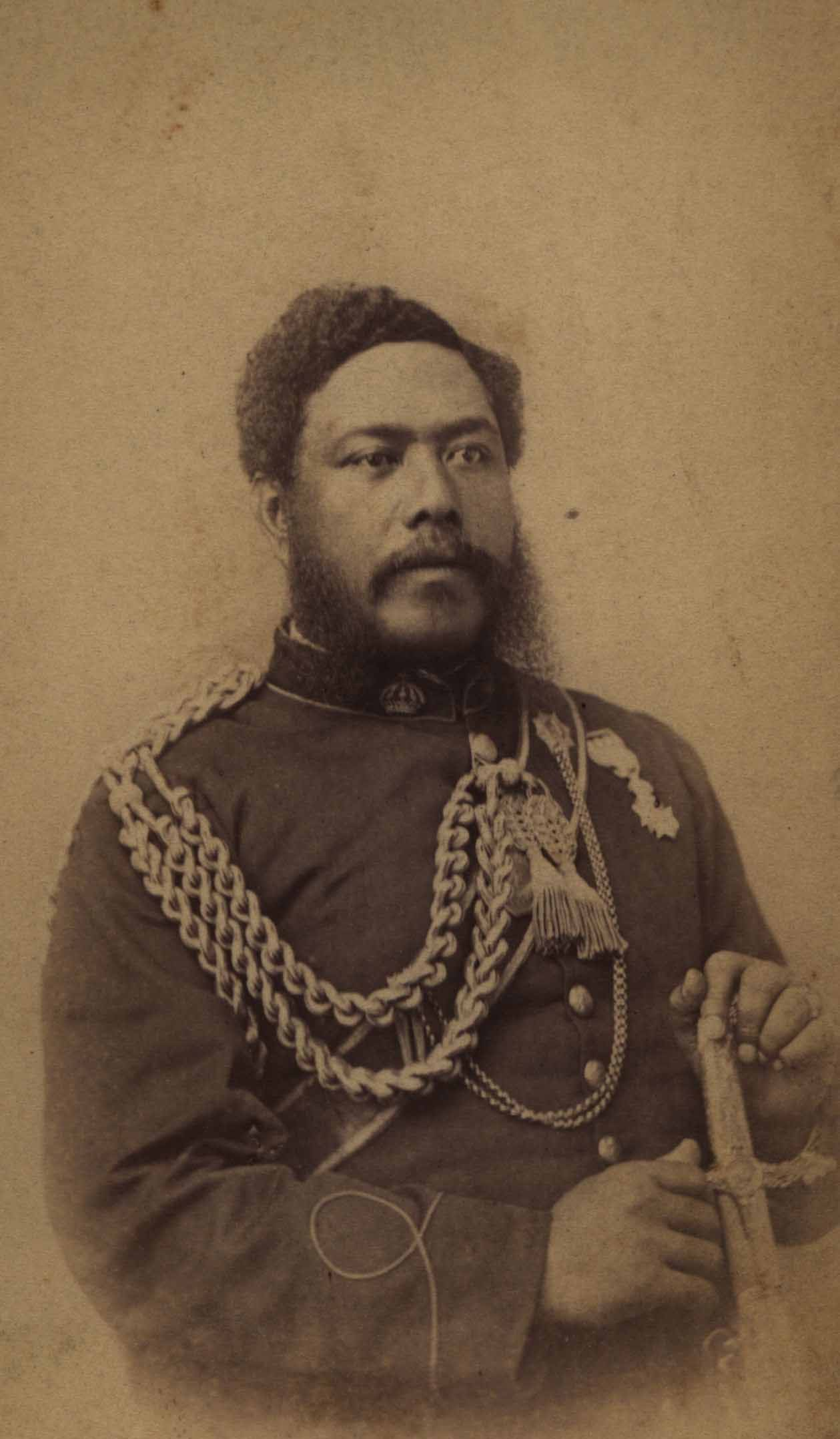
Kalākaua, photograph by Joseph W. King, c. 1860s

Kalākaua's various military, government and court positions prevented him from fully completing his legal training. He received his earliest military training under the Prussian officer, Major Francis Funk, who instilled an admiration of the Prussian military system. In 1852, Prince Liholiho, who would later reign as Kamehameha IV, appointed Kalakaua as one of his aide-de-camp on his military staff. The following year, he commissioned Kalākaua as brevet captain in the infantry. In the army, Kalākaua served as first lieutenant in his father Kapaʻakea's militia of 240 men and later worked as military secretary to Major John William Elliott Maikai, the adjutant general of the army. He was promoted to major and assigned to the personal staff of Kamehameha IV when the king ascended to the throne in 1855. He was promoted to the rank of colonel in 1858.

He became a personal associate and friend of Prince Lot, the future Kamehameha V, who instilled his mission of "Hawaiʻi for Hawaiians" in the young Kalākaua. In the fall of 1860, when he was Chief Clerk of the kingdom's Department of the Interior, Kalākaua accompanied Prince Lot, high chief Levi Haʻalelea and Hawaii's Consul for Peru, Josiah C. Spalding, on a two-month tour of British Columbia and California. They sailed from Honolulu aboard the yacht Emma Rooke, on August 29, arriving on September 18 in Victoria, British Columbia, where they were received by the local dignitaries of the city. In California, the party visited San Francisco, Sacramento, Folsom and other local areas where they were honorably received.

In 1856, Kalākaua was appointed a member of the Privy Council of State by Kamehameha IV. He was also appointed to the House of Nobles, the upper body of the Legislature of the Kingdom of Hawaiʻi in 1858, serving there until 1873. He served as 3rd Chief Clerk of the Department of the Interior in 1859 under Prince Lot who was Minister of the Interior before becoming king in 1863. He held this position until 1863. On June 30, 1863, Kalākaua was appointed Postmaster General and served until his resignation on March 18, 1865. In 1865, he was appointed the King's Chamberlain and served until 1869 when he resigned to finish his law studies. In 1870, he was admitted to the Hawaiian bar and was hired as a clerk in the Land Office, a post he held until he came to the throne. He was decorated a Knight Companion of the Royal Order of Kamehameha I in 1867.

American writer Mark Twain, working as a traveling reporter for the Sacramento Daily Union, visited Hawaiʻi in 1866 during the reign of Kamehameha V. He met the young Kalākaua and other members of the legislature and noted:

Hon. David Kalakaua, who at present holds the office of King's Chamberlain, is a man of fine presence, is an educated gentleman and a man of good abilities. He is approaching forty, I should judge—is thirty-five, at any rate. He is conservative, politic and calculating, makes little display, and does not talk much in the Legislature. He is a quiet, dignified, sensible man, and would do no discredit to the kingly office. The King has power to appoint his successor. If he does such a thing, his choice will probably fall on Kalakaua.

== Marriage ==
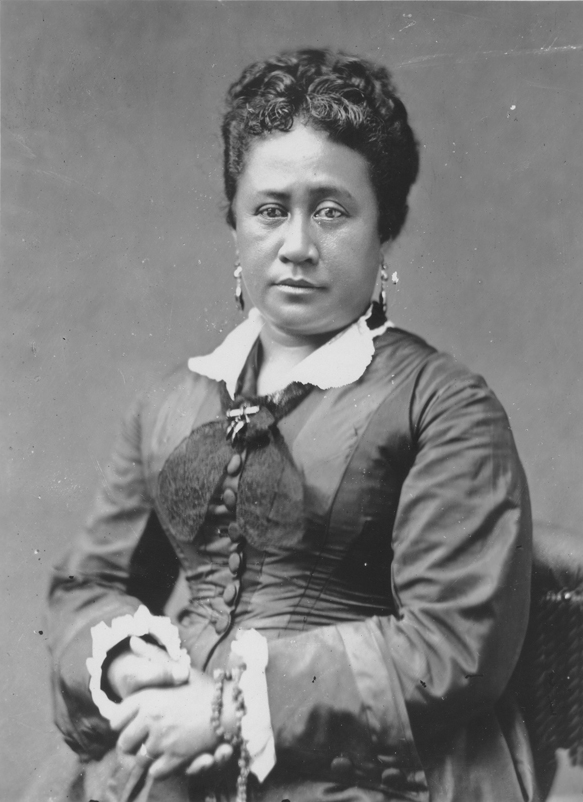
Kapiʻolani, the wife and future queen consort of Kalākaua

Kalākaua was briefly engaged to marry Princess Victoria Kamāmalu, the younger sister of Kamehameha IV and Kamehameha V. However, the match was terminated when the princess decided to renew her on-and-off betrothal to her cousin Lunalilo. Kalākaua would later fall in love with Kapiʻolani, the young widow of Bennett Nāmākēhā, the uncle of Kamehameha IV's wife Queen Emma. A descendant of King Kaumualiʻi of Kauai, Kapiʻolani was Queen Emma's lady-in-waiting and Prince Albert Edward Kamehameha's nurse and caretaker. They married on December 19, 1863, in a quiet ceremony conducted by a minister of the Anglican Church of Hawaiʻi. The timing of the wedding was heavily criticized since it fell during the official mourning period for King Kamehameha IV. Prior to his accession to the throne, the couple lived at Honuakaha, the Honolulu residence that he inherited from his hānai father Kinimaka, which was located at the corner of Punchbowl and Queen street and lay makai (seaside) to the Kawaiahaʻo Church. The marriage remained childless.

== Political ascendancy ==
=== 1873 election ===
King Kamehameha V, died on December 12, 1872, without naming a successor to the throne. Under the 1864 Constitution of the Kingdom of Hawaiʻi, if the king did not appoint a successor, a new king would be appointed by the legislature to begin a new royal line of succession.

There were several candidates for the Hawaiian throne including Bernice Pauahi Bishop, who had been asked to succeed to the throne by Kamehameha V on his deathbed but had declined the offer. However, the contest was centered on the two high-ranking male aliʻi, or chiefs: Lunalilo and Kalākaua. Lunalilo was more popular, partly because he was a higher-ranking chief than Kalākaua and was the immediate cousin of Kamehameha V. Lunalilo was also the more liberal of the two—he promised to amend the constitution to give the people a greater voice in the government. According to historian Ralph S. Kuykendall, there was an enthusiasm among Lunalilo's supporters to have him declared king without holding an election. In response, Lunalilo issued a proclamation stating that, even though he believed himself to be the rightful heir to the throne, he would submit to an election for the good of the kingdom. On January 1, 1873, a popular election was held for the office of King of Hawaiʻi. Lunalilo won with an overwhelming majority while Kalākaua performed extremely poorly receiving 12 votes out of the more than 11,000 votes cast. The next day, the legislature confirmed the popular vote and elected Lunalilo unanimously. Kalākaua conceded.

=== 1874 election ===
Following Lunalilo's ascension, Kalākaua was appointed as colonel on the military staff of the king. He kept politically active during Lunalilo's reign, including leadership involvement with a political organization known as the Young Hawaiians; the group's motto was "Hawaiʻi for the Hawaiians". He had gained political capital with his staunch opposition to ceding any part of the Hawaiian islands to foreign interests. During the ʻIolani Barracks mutiny by the Royal Guards of Hawaiʻi in September 1873, Kalākaua was suspected to have incited the native guards to rebel against their white officers. Lunalilo responded to the insurrection by disbanding the military unit altogether, leaving Hawaiʻi without a standing army for the remainder of his reign.

The issue of succession was a major concern especially since Lunalilo was unmarried and childless at the time. Queen Dowager Emma, the widow of Kamehameha IV, was considered to be Lunalilo's favorite choice as his presumptive heir. On the other hand, Kalākaua and his political cohorts actively campaigned for him to be named successor in the event of the king's death. Among the other candidates considered viable as Lunalilo's successor was the previously mentioned Bernice Pauahi Bishop. She had strong ties to the United States through her marriage to wealthy American businessman Charles Reed Bishop who also served as one of Lunalilo's cabinet ministers. When Lunalilo became ill several months after his election, Native Hawaiians counseled with him to appoint a successor to avoid another election. However he may have personally felt about Emma, he never put it in writing. He failed to act on the issue of a successor, and died on February 3, 1874, setting in motion a bitter election. While Lunalilo did not think of himself as a Kamehameha, his election continued the Kamehameha line to some degree making him the last of the monarchs of the Kamehameha dynasty.

Pauahi chose not to run. Kalākaua's political platform was that he would reign in strict accordance with the kingdom's constitution. Emma campaigned on her assurance that Lunalilo had personally told her he wanted her to succeed him. Several individuals who claimed first-hand knowledge of Lunalilo's wishes backed her publicly. With Lunalilo's privy council issuing a public denial of that claim, the kingdom was divided on the issue. British Commissioner James Hay Wodehouse put the British and American forces docked at Honolulu on the alert for possible violence.

The election was held on February 12, and Kalākaua was elected by the Legislative Assembly by a margin of thirty-nine to six. His election provoked the Honolulu Courthouse riot where supporters of Queen Emma targeted legislators who supported Kalākaua; thirteen legislators were injured. The kingdom was without an army since the mutiny the year before and many police officers sent to quell the riot joined the mob or did nothing. Unable to control the mob, Kalākaua and Lunalilo's former ministers had to request the aid of American and British military forces docked in the harbor to put down the uprising.

== Reign ==
Given the unfavorable political climate following the riot, Kalākaua was quickly sworn in the following day, in a ceremony witnessed by government officials, family members, foreign representatives and some spectators. This inauguration ceremony was held at Kīnaʻu Hale, the residence of the Royal Chamberlain, instead of Kawaiahaʻo Church, as was customary. The hastiness of the affair would prompt him to hold a coronation ceremony in 1883. Upon ascending to the throne, Kalākaua named his brother, William Pitt Leleiohoku, Leleiohoku II, as his heir-apparent. When Leleiohoku II died in 1877, Kalākaua changed the name of his sister Lydia Dominis to Liliuokalani and designated her as his heir-apparent.

From March to May 1874, he toured the main Hawaiian Islands of Kauai, Maui, Hawaiʻi Island, Molokai and Oahu and visited the Kalaupapa Leprosy Settlement.

=== Reciprocity Treaty of 1875 and its extension ===
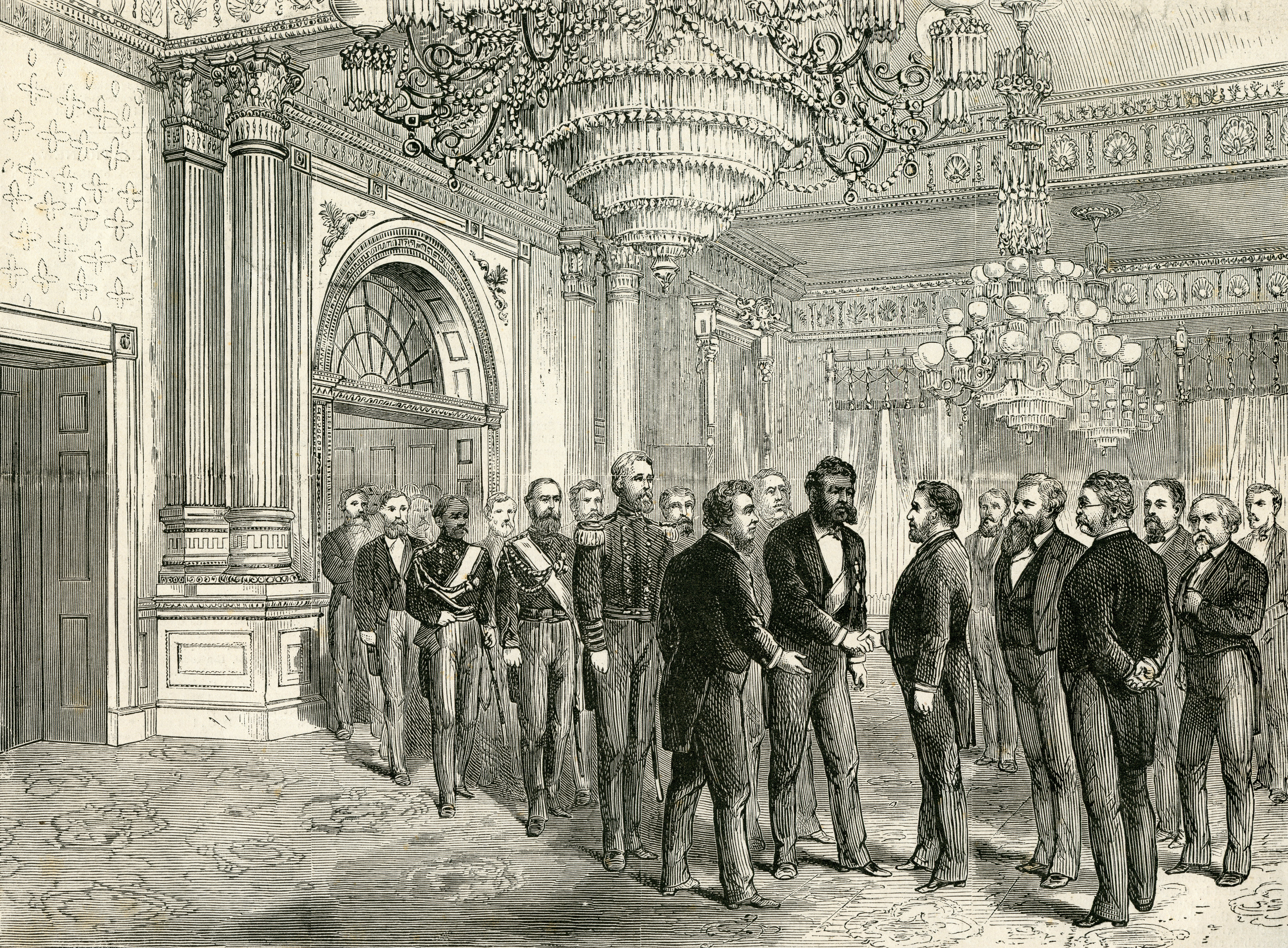
Illustration of Kalākaua's state dinner at the White House, meeting President Ulysses S. Grant

Within a year of Kalākaua's election, he helped negotiate the Reciprocity Treaty of 1875. This free trade agreement between the United States and Hawaiʻi, allowed sugar and other products to be exported to the US duty-free. He led the Reciprocity Commission consisting of sugar planter Henry A. P. Carter of C. Brewer & Co., Hawaiʻi Chief Justice Elisha Hunt Allen, and Minister of Foreign Affairs William Lowthian Green. Kalākaua became the first reigning monarch to visit America. The state dinner in his honor hosted by President Ulysses S. Grant was the first White House state dinner ever held.

Many in the Hawaiʻi business community were willing to cede Pearl Harbor to the United States in exchange for the treaty, but Kalākaua was opposed to the idea. A seven-year treaty was signed on January 30, 1875, without any Hawaiian land being ceded. San Francisco sugar refiner Claus Spreckels became a major investor in Hawaiʻi's sugar industry. Initially, he bought half of the first year's production; ultimately he became the plantations' major shareholder. Spreckels became one of Kalākaua's close associates.

When it expired, an extension of the treaty was negotiated, giving exclusive use of Pearl Harbor to the United States. Ratifications by both parties took two years and eleven months, and were exchanged on December 9, 1887, extending the agreement for an additional seven years.

Over the term of Kalākaua's reign, the treaty had a major effect on the kingdom's income. In 1874, Hawaiʻi exported $1,839,620.27 in products. The value of exported products in 1890, the last full year of his reign, was $13,282,729.48, an increase of 722%. The export of sugar during that period grew from 24,566,611 pounds to 330,822,879 pounds.

=== Education of Hawaiian Youths Abroad ===
The Education of Hawaiian Youths Abroad was a government-funded educational program during Kalākaua's reign to help students further their education beyond the institutions available in Hawaiʻi at that time. Between 1880 and 1887, Kalākaua selected 18 students for enrollment in a university or apprenticeship to a trade, outside the Kingdom of Hawaiʻi. These students furthered their education in Italy, England, Scotland, China, Japan and California. During the life of the program, the legislature appropriated $100,000 to support it. When the Bayonet Constitution went into effect, the students were recalled to Hawaiʻi.

=== Trip around the world ===
Journey of King Kalākaua in 1881

King Kalākaua and his boyhood friends William Nevins Armstrong and Charles Hastings Judd, along with personal cook Robert von Oelhoffen, circumnavigated the globe in 1881. The purpose of the 281-day trip was to encourage the importation of contract labor for plantations. Kalākaua set a world record as the first monarch to travel around the world. He appointed his sister and heir-apparent Liliuokalani to act as Regent during his absence.

Setting sail on January 20, they visited California before sailing to Asia. There they spent four months opening contract labor dialogue in Japan and China, while sightseeing and spreading goodwill through nations that were potential sources for workers. They continued through Southeast Asia, and then headed for Europe in June, where they stayed until mid-September. Their most productive immigration talks were in Portugal, where Armstrong stayed behind to negotiate an expansion of Hawaiʻi's existing treaty with the government.

President James A. Garfield in Washington, D.C., had been assassinated in their absence. On their return trip to the United States, Kalākaua paid a courtesy call on Garfield's successor President Chester A. Arthur. Before embarking on a train ride across the United States, Kalākaua visited Thomas Edison for a demonstration of electric lighting, discussing its potential use in Honolulu.

They departed for Hawaiʻi from San Francisco on October 22, arriving in Honolulu on October 31. His homecoming celebration went on for days. He had brought the small island nation to the attention of world leaders, but the trip had sparked rumors that the kingdom was for sale. In Hawaiʻi there were critics who believed the labor negotiations were just his excuse to see the world. Eventually, his efforts bore fruit in increased contract labor for Hawaiʻi.

Thomas Thrum's Hawaiian Almanac and Annual for 1883 reported Kalākaua's tour expense appropriated by the government as $22,500, although his personal correspondence indicates he exceeded that early on.

=== ʻIolani Palace ===
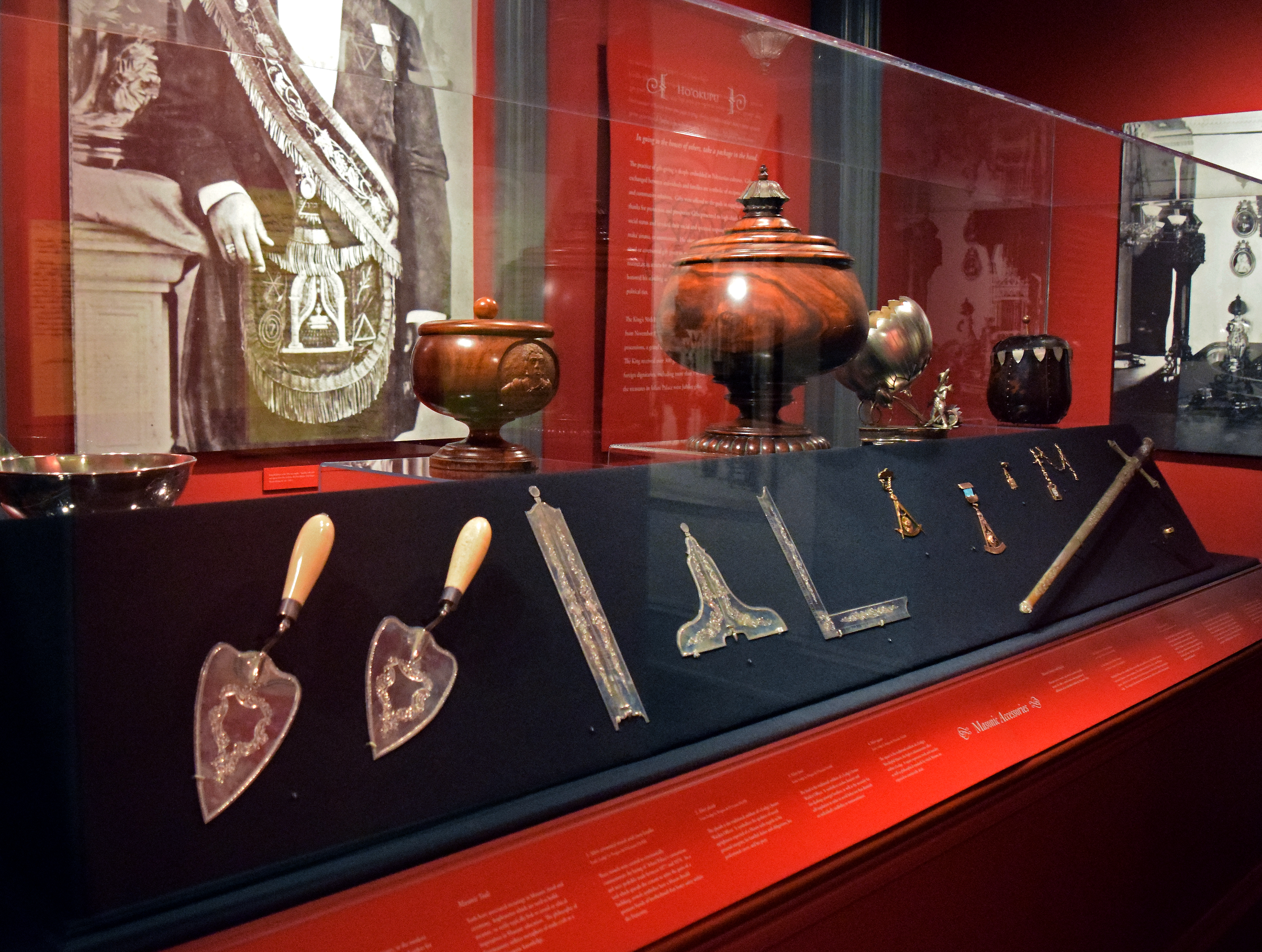
"[T]he working tools of a mason" presented to Kalākaua by the freemasons on December 31, 1879, on display in the palace basement

'Iolani Palace is the only royal palace on US soil. The first palace was a coral and wood structure which served primarily as office space for the kingdom's monarchs beginning with Kamehameha III in 1845. By the time Kalākaua became king, the structure had decayed, and he ordered it destroyed to be replaced with a new building. During the 1878 session of the legislature Finance Chairman Walter Murray Gibson, a political supporter of Kalākaua's, pushed through appropriations of $50,000 for the new palace.

Construction began in 1879, with an additional $80,000 appropriated later to furnish it and complete the construction. Three architects worked on the design, Thomas J. Baker, Charles J. Wall and Isaac Moore. December 31, 1879, the 45th birthday of Queen Kapiʻolani, was the date Kalākaua chose for the ceremonial laying of the cornerstone. Minister of Foreign Affairs John Mākini Kapena delivered the ceremony's formal address in Hawaiian. As Master of the Freemason Lodge Le Progres de L'Oceanie, Kalākaua charged the freemasons with orchestrating the ceremonies. The parade preceding the laying of the cornerstone involved every civilian and military organization in Hawaiʻi. The Pacific Commercial Advertiser noted it was "one of the largest seen in Honolulu for some years". A copper time capsule containing photographs, documents, currency, and the Hawaiian census was sealed inside the cornerstone. After speeches had been made, the freemasons presented the king with "the working tools of a mason", a plumb bob, level, square tool, and a trowel.

In between the laying of the cornerstone and the finishing of the new palace, Kalākaua had seen how other monarchs lived. He wanted ʻIolani to measure up to the standards of the rest of the world. The furnishing and interiors of the finished palace were reflective of that. Immediately upon completion, the king invited all 120 members of Lodge Le Progres de L'Oceanie to the palace for a lodge meeting. Kalākaua had also seen during his visit to Edison's studio how effective electric lighting could be for the kingdom. On July 21, 1886, ʻIolani Palace led the way with the first electric lights in the kingdom, showcasing the technology. The monarch invited the public to attend a lighting ceremony on the palace grounds, attracting 5,000 spectators. The Royal Hawaiian Band entertained, refreshments were served, and the king paraded his troops around the grounds. The total cost of building and furnishing the new palace was $343,595.

=== 1883 coronation ===
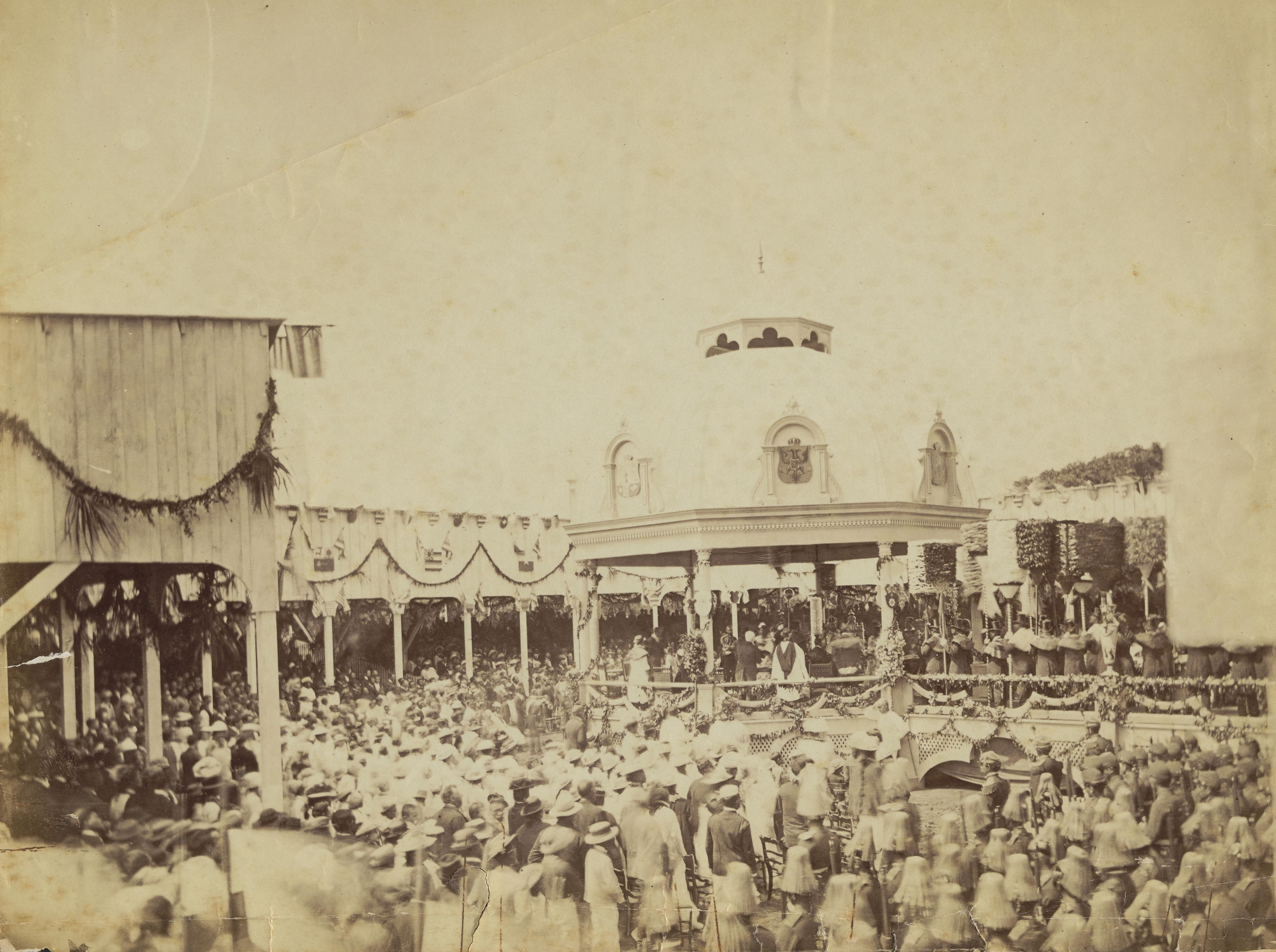
Coronation ceremony at ʻIolani Palace, 1883

Kalākaua and Kapiʻolani had been denied a coronation ceremony in 1874 because of the civil unrest following the election. Under Finance Chairman Gibson, the 1880 legislature appropriated $10,000 for a coronation. Gibson was believed to be the main proponent behind the event. On October 10, 1882, the Saturday Press indicated that not all the public was in favor of the coronation. By this point, Gibson's role in the kingdom's finances and his influence on Kalākaua were beginning to come under scrutiny: "Our versatile Premier ... is pulling another string in this puppet farce." At the same time, the newspaper rebuked many of the recent actions and policies not only of Gibson but of the King's cabinet in general.

The coronation ceremony and related celebratory events were spread out over a two-week period. A special octagon-shaped pavilion and grandstand were built for the February 12, 1883, ceremony. Preparations were made for an anticipated crowd exceeding 5,000, with lawn chairs to accommodate any overflow. Before the actual event, a procession of 630 adults and children paraded from downtown to the palace. Kalākaua and Kapiʻolani, accompanied by their royal retinue, came out of the palace onto the event grounds. The coronation was preceded by a choir singing and the formal recitation of the King's official titles. The news coverage noted, "The King looked ill at ease." Chief Justice of Hawaiʻi's Supreme Court Albert Francis Judd officiated and delivered the oath of office to the king. The crown was then handed to Kalākaua, and he placed it upon his head. The ceremony ended with the choir singing, and a prayer. A planned post-coronation reception by Kalākaua and Kapiʻolani was cancelled without advance notice. Today, Kalākaua's coronation pavilion serves as the bandstand for the Royal Hawaiian Band.

Following the ceremony, Kalākaua unveiled the Kamehameha Statue in front of Aliiolani Hale, the government building, with Gibson delivering the unveiling speech. This statue was a second replica. Originally intended for the centennial of Captain James Cook's landing in Hawaiʻi, the statue, which was the brainchild of Gibson, had been cast by Thomas Ridgeway Gould but had been lost during shipment off the Falkland Islands. By the time the replica arrived, the intended date had passed, and it was decided to unveil the statue as part of the coronation ceremony. Later, the original statue was salvaged and restored. It was sent to Kohala, Hawaiʻi, Kamehameha's birthplace, where it was unveiled by the king on May 8. The legislature had allocated $10,000 for the first statue and insured it for $12,000. A further $7,000 was allocated for the second statue with an additional $4,000 from the insurance money spent to add four bas relief panels depicting historic moments during Kamehamena's reign.

That evening, the royal couple hosted a state dinner, and there was a luau at a later day. The hula was performed nightly on the palace grounds. Regattas, horse races and a number of events filled the celebration period. Due to weather conditions, the planned illumination of the palace and grounds for the day of the coronation happened a week later, and the public was invited to attend. Fireworks displays lit up the sky at the palace and at Punchbowl Crater. A grand ball was held the evening of February 20.

Volcano school painter Charles Furneaux attended the coronation, where he painted two scenes: the moment the King placed the crown upon his head, and an image of the King viewing a hula performance from the palace. Although both works were highly regarded and their existence was confirmed as recently as 1909, their current locations are unknown.

Although exact figures are unknown, historian Kuykendall stated that the final cost of the coronation exceeded $50,000.

=== Kalākaua coinage ===
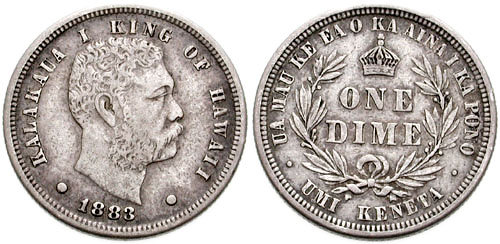
Kalākaua 1883 dime

The Kalākaua coinage was minted to boost Hawaiian pride. At this time, United States gold coins had been accepted for any debt over $50; any debt under $50 was payable by US silver coins. In 1880, the legislature passed a currency law that allowed it to purchase bullion for the United States mint to produce Hawaiʻi's own coins. The design would have the King's image on the obverse side, with Hawaiʻi's coat of arms and motto "Ua Mau ke Ea o ka ʻĀina i ka Pono" on the reverse. In a deal with Claus Spreckels, he sponsored the minting by purchasing the required silver. In return, he was guaranteed an equal amount of six percent gold bonds, thereby giving him a guaranteed profit.

When Hawaiʻi's silver coins began circulating in December 1883, the business community was reluctant to accept them, fearing they would drive US gold coins out of the market. Spreckels opened his own bank to circulate them. Business owners feared economic inflation and lost faith in the government, as did foreign governments. Political fallout from the coinage led to the 1884 election-year shift towards the Kuokoa (independent) Party in the legislature. It passed the Currency Act to restrict acceptance of silver coins as payment for debts under $10. Exchange of silver for gold at the treasury was then limited to $150,000 a month. In 1903, the Hawaiʻi silver coins were redeemed for US silver and melted down at the San Francisco Mint.

=== Birthday Jubilee, November 15–29, 1886 ===
Kalākaua's 50th birthday on November 16, 1886, was celebrated with a two-week jubilee. Gibson had by this time joined the King's cabinet as prime minister of Hawaiʻi. He and Minister of the Interior Luther Aholo put forth a motion for the legislature to form a committee to oversee the birthday jubilee on September 20. The motion was approved, and at Gibson's subsequent request, the legislature appropriated $15,000 for the jubilee. An announcement was made on November 3 that all government schools would be closed the week of November 15.

Gifts for the king began arriving on November 15. At midnight, the jubilee officially began with fireworks at the Punchbowl Crater. At sunrise, the kingdom's police force arrived at ʻIolani Palace to pay tribute, followed by the king's Cabinet, Supreme Court justices, the kingdom's diplomats, and officials of government departments. School student bodies and civic organizations also paid tribute. The Royal Hawaiian Band played throughout the day. In the afternoon, the doors of the palace were opened to all the officials and organizations, and the public. In the evening, the palace was aglow with lanterns, candles and electric lighting throwing "a flood of radiance over the Palace and grounds". The evening ended with a Fireman's Parade and fireworks. Throughout the next two weeks, there was a regatta, a Jubilee ball, a luau, athletic competitions, a state dinner, and a marksmanship contest won by the Honolulu Rifles. Harper's Weekly reported in 1891 that the final cost of the jubilee was $75,000.

=== Military policy ===
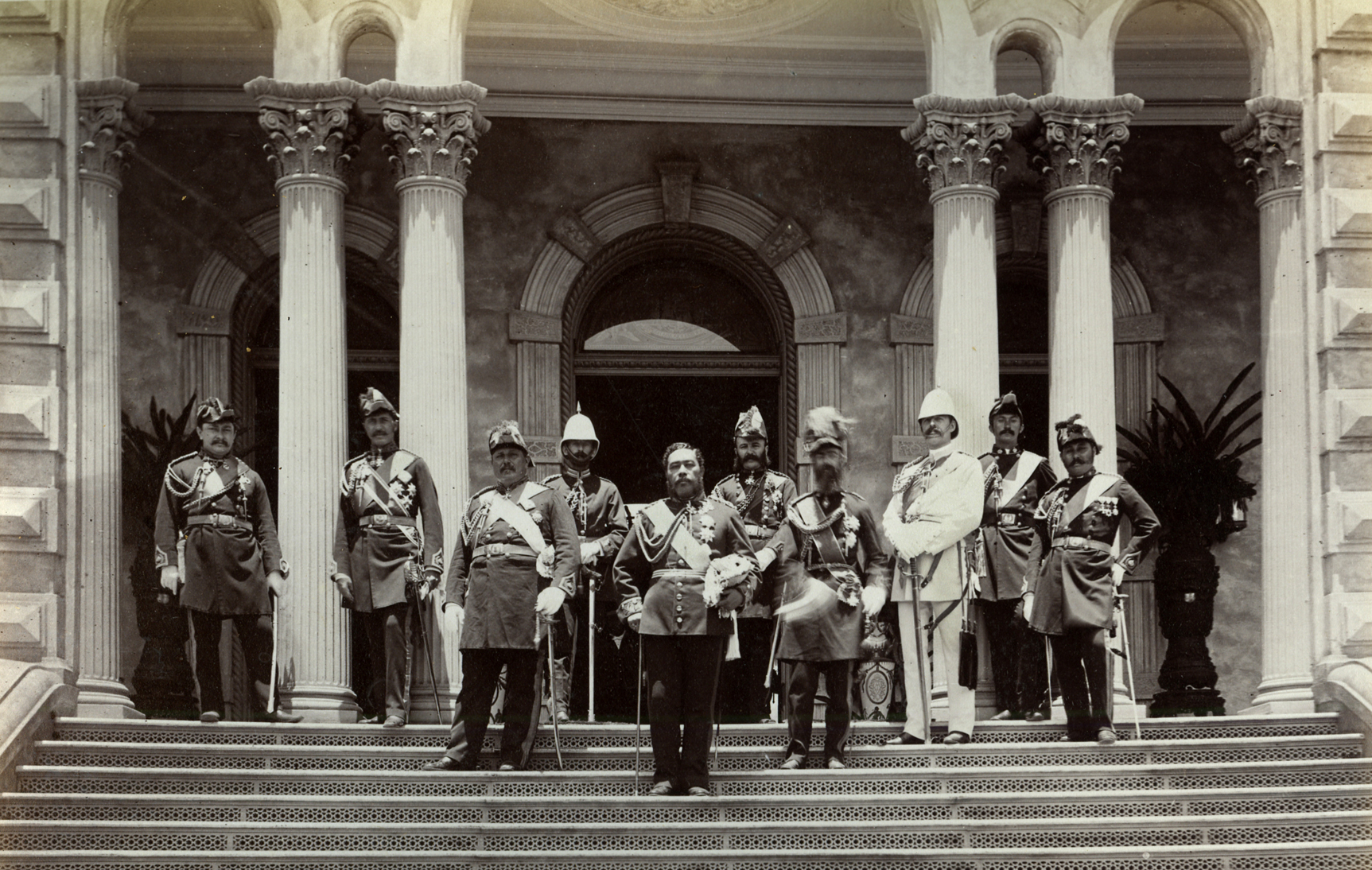
Kalākaua with his military staff officers, 1882

During the early part of his reign, Kalākaua restored the Household Guards which had been defunct since his predecessor Lunalilo abolished the unit in 1874. Initially, the king created three volunteer companies: the Leleiohoku Guard, a cavalry unit; the Prince's Own, an artillery unit; and the Hawaiian Guards, an infantry unit. By the latter part of his reign, the army of the Kingdom of Hawaiʻi consisted of six volunteer companies including the King's Own, the Queen's Own, the Prince's Own, the Leleiohoku Guard, the Mamalahoa Guard and the Honolulu Rifles, and the regular troops of the King's Household Guard. The ranks of these regiments were composed mainly of Hawaiian and part-Hawaiian officers with a few white officers including his brother-in-law John Owen Dominis. Each unit was subject to call for active service when necessary. The king and the governor of Oahu also had their own personal staff of military officers with the ranks of colonel and major.

On October 1, 1886, the Military Act of 1886 was passed which created a Department of War and a Department of the Navy under the Minister of Foreign Affairs who would also serve as Secretary of War and of the Navy. Dominis was appointed lieutenant general and commander-in-chief and other officers were commissioned while the king was made the supreme commander and generalissimo of the Hawaiian Army. Around this time, the government also bought and commissioned His Hawaiian Majesty's Ship (HHMS) Kaimiloa, the first and only vessel of the Hawaiian Royal Navy, under the command of Captain George E. Gresley Jackson.

After 1887, the military commissions creating Dominis and his staff officers were recalled for economic reasons and the Military Act of 1886 was later declared unconstitutional. The Military Act of 1888 was passed reducing the size of the army to the King's Guards, a permanent force with a cap of 65 members, and five volunteer companies: the Honolulu Rifles, the King's Own, the Queen's Own, the Prince's Own, and the Leleiohoku Guard. In 1890, another military act further restricted the army to just the King's Royal Guards with a maximal recruitment of 36-100 men.

=== Polynesian confederation ===
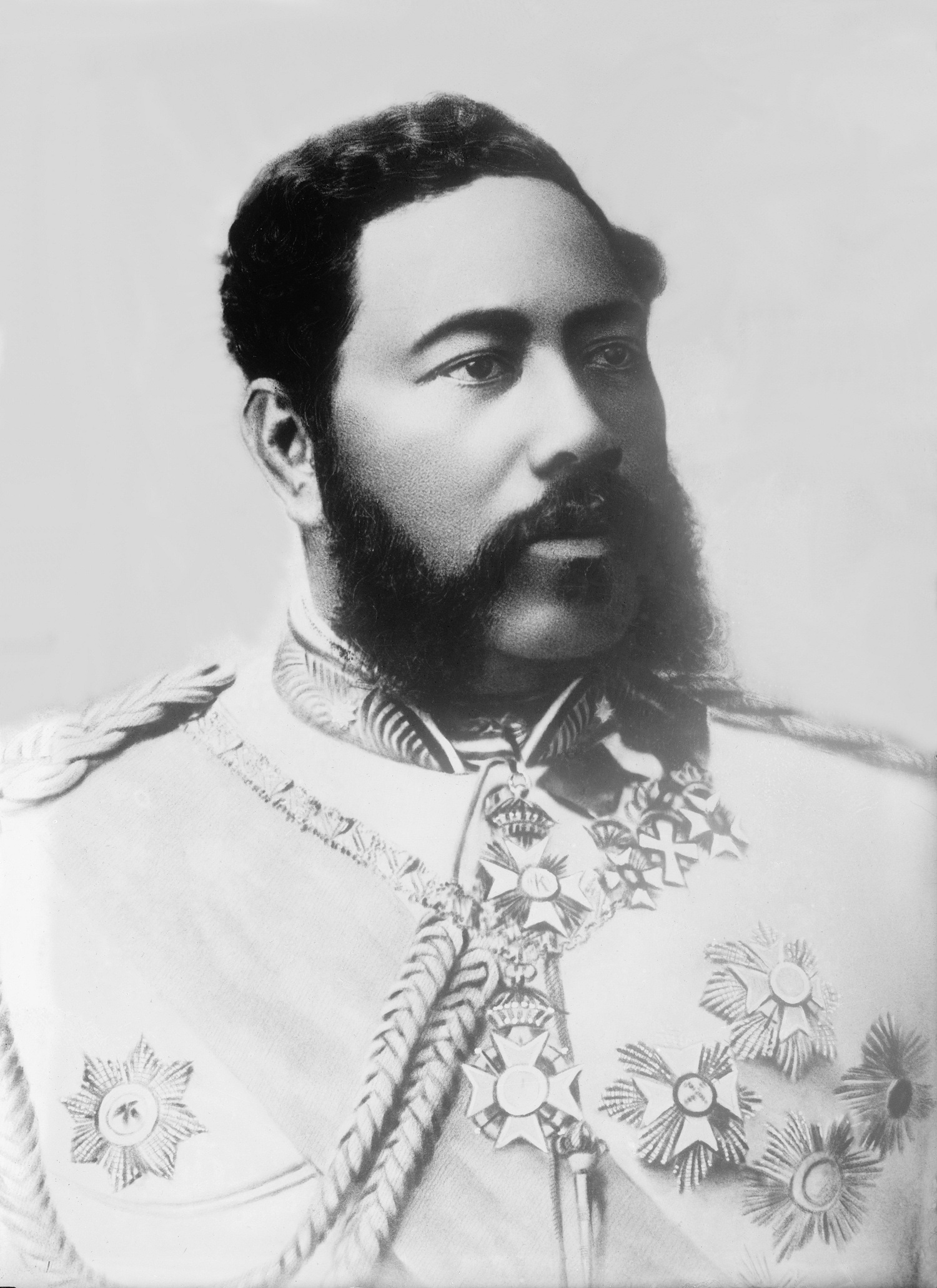
Portrait of Kalākaua

The idea of Hawaiʻi's involvement in the internal affairs of Polynesian nations had been around at least two decades before Kalākaua's election, when Australian Charles St Julian volunteered to be a political liaison to Hawaiʻi in 1853. He accomplished nothing of any significance. Kalākaua's interest in forming a Polynesian coalition, with him at the head, was influenced by both Walter M. Gibson and Italian soldier of fortune Celso Caesar Moreno. In 1879 Moreno urged the king to create such a realm with Hawaiʻi at the top of the empire by " ... uniting under your sceptre the whole Polynesian race and make Honolulu a monarchical Washington, where the representatives of all the islands would convene in Congress."

In response to the activities of Germany and the United Kingdom in Oceania, Gibson's Pacific Commercial Advertiser urged Hawaiʻi's involvement in protecting the island nations from international aggression. Gibson was appointed to Kalākaua's cabinet as Minister of Foreign Affairs in 1882. In 1883, he introduced the approved legislation to convey in writing to foreign governments that Hawaiʻi fully supported the independence of Polynesian nations. The subsequent "Hawaiian protest" letter he drafted was mostly ignored by nations that received it. The Daily Bulletin in Honolulu issued its own response, "Hawaiʻi's true policy is to confine her attention to herself, ...". The Hawaiian Gazette criticized Gibson's character and mockingly referred to the proposed venture as the "Empire of the Calabash".

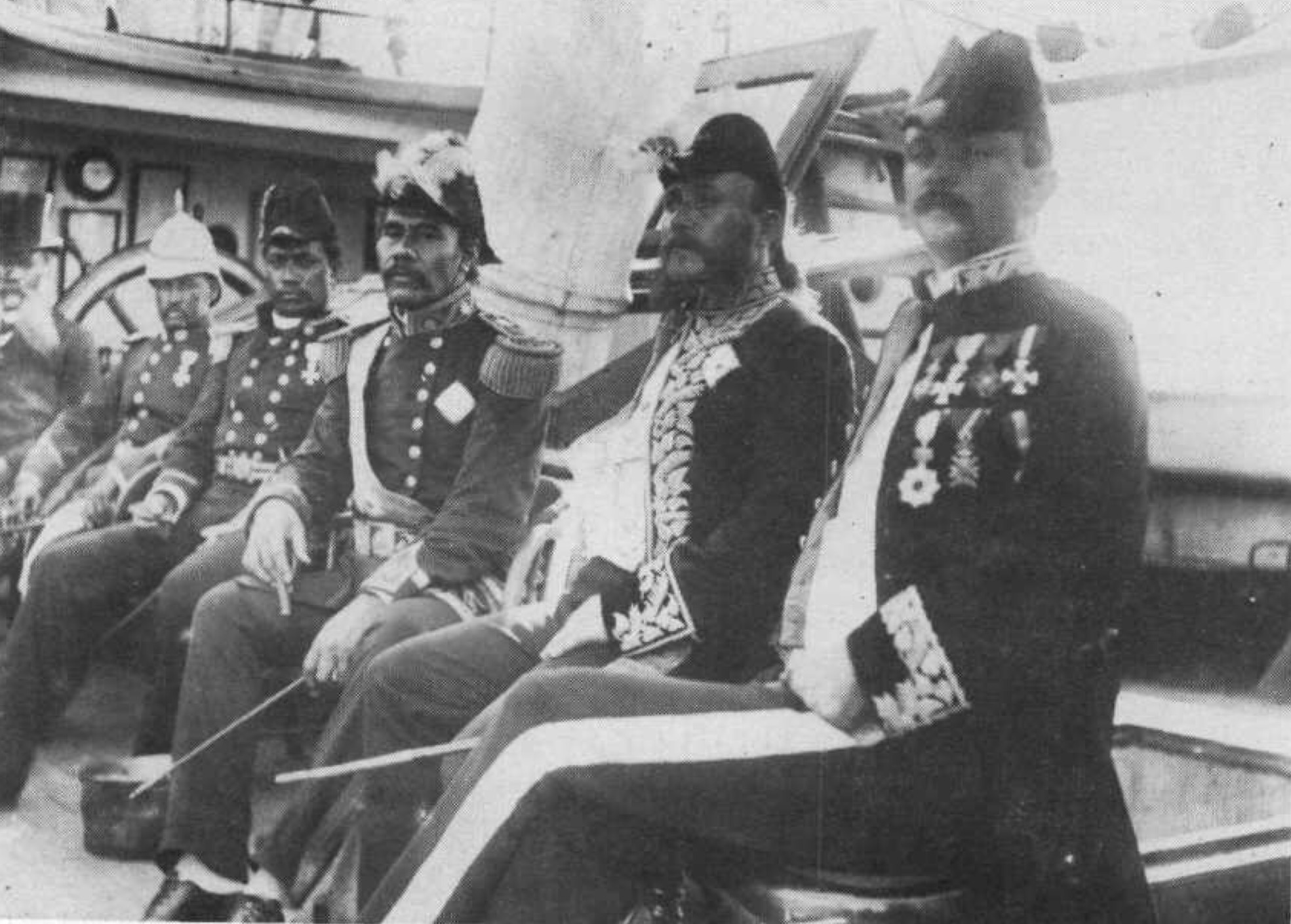
Hawaiian envoys and Malietoa Laupepa on board of the Kaimiloa in 1887

In 1885, Gibson dispatched Minister to the United States Henry A. P. Carter to Washington, D.C., and Europe to convey Hawaiʻi's intentions towards Polynesia. Carter made little headway with Gibson's instructions. He pushed for direct intervention into a political upheaval in Samoa, where the German Empire backed rebels under their leader Tamasese in an attempt to overthrow King Malietoa Laupepa. In an effort to keep him in power, Gibson convinced the 1886 legislature to allocate $100,000 to purchase the steamship Zealandia, $50,000 for its operating expenses, and $35,000 for foreign missions. United States special commissioner to Samoa, George H. Bates advised Kalākaua that Hawaiʻi should mind its own business and stay out of Samoan affairs. Instead, Hawaiʻi sent a delegation headed by John E. Bush to Samoa, where Samoan King Malietoa Laupepa signed a Samoan-Hawaiian confederation treaty on February 17, 1887. Bush also presented Malietoa with the Royal Order of the Star of Oceania, which Kalakaua had created to honor the monarchs and chiefs of the Polynesian confederation. The government sent HHMS Kaimiloa for Bush's use in visiting the chiefs of the other islands of Polynesia.

The United States and the United Kingdom joined with Germany in expressing their disapproval of the treaty. Germany warned the United States and the United Kingdom, "In case Hawaiʻi ... should try to interfere in favor of Malietoa, the King of the Sandwich Islands would thereby enter into [a] state of war with us." When German warships arrived in Samoan waters, Malietoa surrendered and was sent into exile. The Kaimiloa and Bush's delegation were recalled to Honolulu after the ousting of the Gibson administration. Kalākaua's later explanation of Hawaiʻi's interference in Samoa was, "Our Mission was simply a Mission of phylanthropy [sic] more than any thing, but the arogance [sic] of the Germans prevented our good intentions and . . . we had to withdraw the Mission."

== 1887 Bayonet Constitution ==
In Memoirs of the Hawaiian Revolution, Sanford B. Dole devoted a chapter to the Bayonet Constitution. He stated that King Kalākaua appointed cabinet members not for their ability to do the job, but for their ability to bend to his will. Consequently, according to Dole, appropriated funds were shifted from one account to another, "for fantastic enterprises and for the personal aggrandizement of the royal family." Dole placed much of the blame on Gibson, and accused Kalākaua of taking a bribe of $71,000 from Tong Kee to grant an opium license, an action done via one of the king's political allies Junius Kaʻae.

Despite his own personal opposition, Kalākaua signed a legislative bill in 1886 creating a single opium vending and distribution license. Kaʻae had suggested to rice planter Tong Kee, also known as Aki, that a monetary gift to the king might help him acquire it. Aki took the suggestion and gave thousands of dollars to the king. Another merchant, Chun Lung, made the government an offer of $80,000.00 which forced Aki to raise even more cash. The license was eventually awarded to Chun who withheld his payment until the license was actually signed over to him on December 31, 1886. Kalākaua admitted that he had been overruled by his cabinet who were friendly with Chun. After the reform party took control of the government, the opium license debt remained unpaid. Kalākaua agreed to make restitution for his debts via revenues from the Crown Lands. However, other liabilities and outstanding debt forced him to sign his debt over to trustees who would control all of Kalākaua's private estates and Crown Land revenues. When trustees refused to add the opium debt, Aki sued. Although the court ruled, "The king could do no wrong", the trustees were found liable for the debt.

The Hawaiian League was formed to change the status quo of government "by all means necessary", and had joined forces with the Honolulu Rifles militia group. Anticipating a coup d'état, the king took measures to save himself by dismissing Gibson and his entire cabinet on June 28. Fearing an assassination was not out of the question, Kalākaua barricaded himself inside the palace. The Hawaiian League presented a June 30 resolution demanding the king's restitution for the alleged bribe. Also known as the "committee of thirteen", it was composed of: Paul Isenberg, William W. Hall, James A. Kennedy, William Hyde Rice, Captain James A. King, E. B. Thomas, H. C. Reed, John Mark Vivas, W. P. A. Brewer, Rev. W. B. Oleson, Cecil Brown, Captain George Ross and Joseph Ballard Atherton.

The newly appointed cabinet members were William Lowthian Green as prime minister and minister of finance, Clarence W. Ashford as attorney general, Lorrin A. Thurston as minister of the interior, and Godfrey Brown as minister of foreign affairs.

A new constitution was drafted immediately by the Hawaiian Committee and presented to Kalākaua for his signature on July 6. The next day he issued a proclamation of the abrogation of the 1864 Constitution of the Kingdom of Hawaiʻi. The new constitution was nicknamed the Bayonet Constitution because of the duress under which it was signed. His sister Liliuokalani stated in Hawaii's Story that her brother was convinced that if he did not sign, he would be assassinated. She wrote that he no longer knew who was friend or foe. He felt betrayed by people he once trusted and had told her that everywhere he went he was under constant surveillance.

It has been known ever since that day as "The Bayonet Constitution," and the name is well chosen; for the cruel treatment received by the king from the military companies, which had been organized by his enemies under other pretences, but really to give them the power of coercion, was the chief measure used to enforce his submission.

— Liliʻuokalani

The Bayonet Constitution allowed the King to appoint his cabinet but placed that cabinet under the sole authority of the legislature. It required any executive actions of the monarch to be approved by the cabinet. Previous suffrage (voting rights) was restricted to male subjects of the kingdom regardless of race. The new constitution restricted suffrage only to Hawaiian, American or European men residing in Hawaii, if they were 21 years old, literate with no back unpaid taxes, and would take an oath to support the law of the land. By placing a new minimum qualifier of $3,000 in property ownership and a minimum income of $600 for voters of the House of Nobles, the new constitution disqualified many poor Native Hawaiians from voting for half of the legislature. Naturalized Asians were deprived of the vote for both houses of the legislature.

Gibson was arrested on July 1 and charged with embezzlement of public funds. The case was soon dropped for lack of evidence. Gibson fled to California on July 12, and died there 6 months later on January 21, 1888.

When the new constitution went into effect, state-sponsored students studying abroad were recalled. One of those was Robert William Wilcox who had been sent to Italy for military training. Wilcox's initial reaction to the turn of events was advocating Liliuokalani be installed as Regent. On July 30, 1889, however, he and Robert Napuʻuako Boyd, another state-sponsored student, led a rebellion aimed at restoring the 1864 constitution, and, thereby, the king's power. Kalākaua, possibly fearing Wilcox intended to force him to abdicate in favor of his sister, was not in the palace when the insurrection happened. The government's military defense led to the surrender of the Wilcox's insurgents.

== Death and succession ==
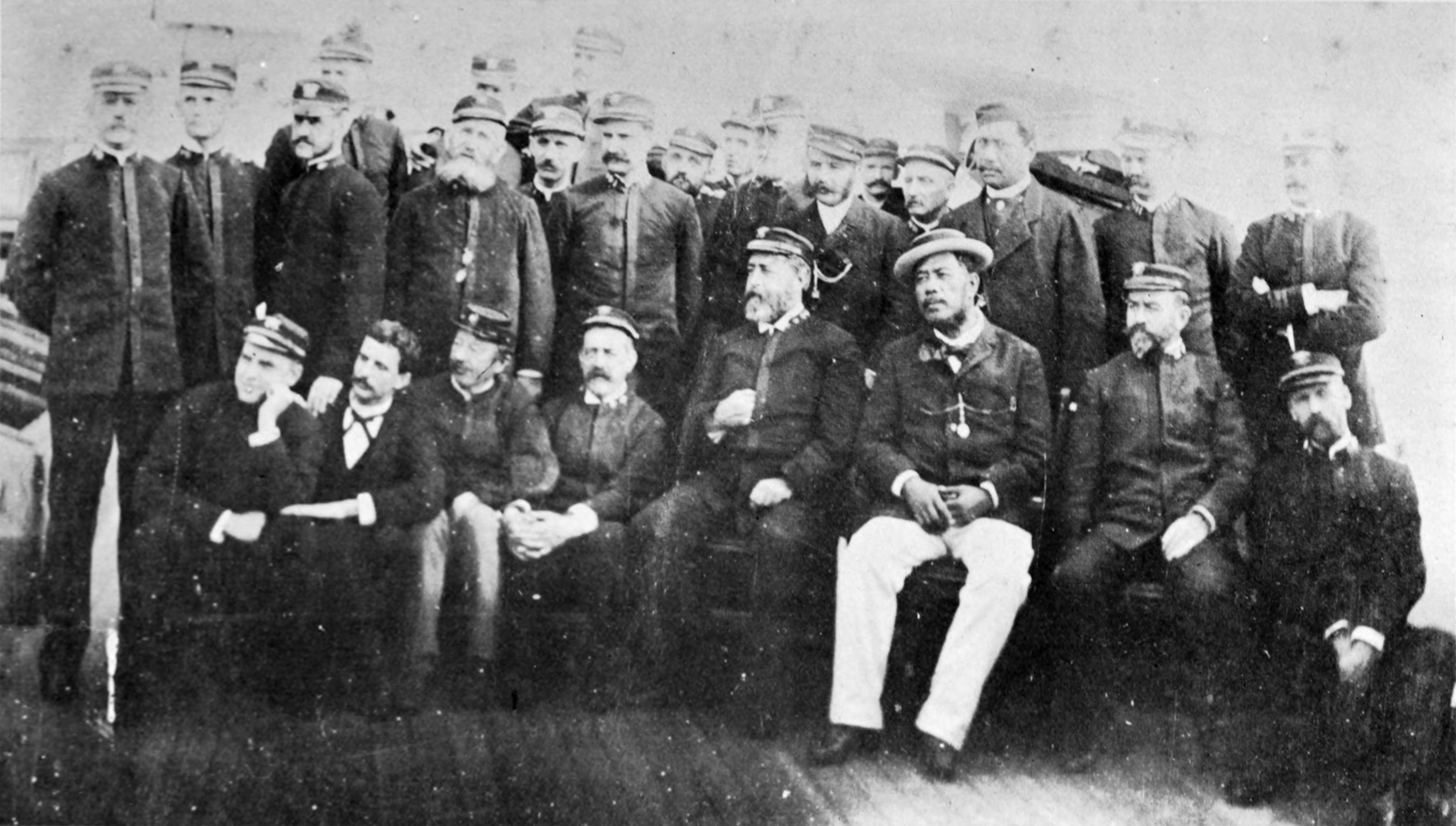
Kalākaua (in white slacks) aboard the USS Charleston en route to San Francisco

Kalākaua sailed for California aboard the USS Charleston on November 25, 1890. Accompanying him were his trusted friends George W. Macfarlane and Robert Hoapili Baker. There was uncertainty about the purpose of the king's trip. Minister of Foreign Affairs John Adams Cummins reported the trip was solely for the king's health and would not extend beyond California. Local newspapers and British commissioner Wodehouse worried the king might go farther east to Washington, D.C., to negotiate a continued cession of Pearl Harbor to the United States after the expiration of the reciprocity treaty or possible annexation of the kingdom. His sister Liliʻuokalani, after unsuccessfully dissuading him from departing, wrote he meant to discuss the McKinley Tariff with the Hawaiian ambassador to the United States Henry A. P. Carter in Washington. She was again appointed to serve as regent during his absence.

Upon arriving in California, the party landed in San Francisco on December 5. Kalākaua, whose health had been declining, stayed in a suite at the Palace Hotel. Traveling throughout Southern California and Northern Mexico, he suffered a minor stroke in Santa Barbara and was rushed back to San Francisco. He was placed under the care of George W. Woods, surgeon of the United States Pacific Fleet. Against the advice of Dr. Woods, Kalākaua insisted on going to his initiation at the Ancient Arabic Order of the Nobles of the Mystic Shrine (A.A.O.N.M.S.) on January 14. He was given a tonic of Vin Mariani that got him on his feet, and was accompanied to the rites by an escort from the Nobles of the Mystic Shrine. The ceremonies did not take long, and he was returned to his suite within an hour. Two days before his death, he lapsed into a coma. Kalākaua died at 2:35 pm on Tuesday, January 20, 1891. US Navy officials listed the official cause of death as Bright's Disease (inflammation of the kidneys).

His last words were, "Aue, he kanaka au, eia i loko o ke kukonukonu o ka maʻi!," or "Alas, I am a man who is seriously ill." The more popular quote, "Tell my people I tried", attributed as his last words, was actually invented by novelist Eugene Burns in his 1952 biography of Kalākaua, The Last King of Paradise. Shortly before his death, his voice was recorded on a phonograph cylinder, which is now in the Bernice P. Bishop Museum.

The news of Kalākaua's death did not reach Hawaiʻi until January 29 when the Charleston returned to Honolulu with the king's remains. As his designated heir-apparent, Liliuokalani ascended to the throne the same day.

After a state funeral in California and a second one in Honolulu, the king's remains were buried in the Royal Mausoleum at Mauna ʻAla on February 15, 1891. In a ceremony officiated by his sister Liliʻuokalani on June 24, 1910, his remains, and those of his family, were transferred to the underground Kalākaua Crypt after the main mausoleum building had been converted into a chapel.

== Legacy ==
Kalākaua's reign is generally regarded as the first Hawaiian Renaissance, for both his influence on Hawaiʻi's music, and for other contributions he made to reinvigorate Hawaiian culture. His actions inspired the reawakening Hawaiian pride and nationalism for the kingdom.

During the earlier reign of Christian convert Kaʻahumanu, dancing the hula was forbidden and punishable by law. Subsequent monarchs gradually began allowing the hula, but it was Kalākaua who brought it back in full force. Chants, meles and the hula were part of the official entertainment at Kalākaua's coronation and his birthday jubilee. He issued an invitation to all Hawaiians with knowledge of the old mele and chants to participate in the coronation, and arranged for musicologist A. Marques to observe the celebrations. Kalākaua's cultural legacy lives on in the Merrie Monarch Festival, a large-scale annual hula competition in Hilo, Hawaiʻi, begun in 1964 and named in his honor. A composer of the ancient chants or mele, for the first time Kalākaua published a written version of the Kumulipo, a 2,102-line chant that had traditionally been passed down orally. It traces the royal lineage and the creation of the cosmos. He is also known to have revived the Hawaiian martial art of Lua, and surfing.

The Hawaiian Board of Health (different from the governmental Board of Health) passed by the 1886 legislature consisted of five Native Hawaiians, appointed by Kalākaua, who oversaw the licensing and regulation of the traditional practice of native healing arts. He also appointed Emma Kaili Metcalf Beckley Nakuina as the first Native Hawaiian curator of the Hawaiian National Museum and increased funding for the institution.

In 1886, Kalākaua had his Privy Council license the ancient Hale Nauā Society for persons of Hawaiian ancestry. The original Hale Naua had not been active since Kamehameha I, when it had functioned as a genealogical research organization for claims of royal lineage. When Kalākaua reactivated it, he expanded its purpose to encompass Hawaiian culture as well as modern-day arts and sciences and included women as equals. The ranks of the society grew to more than 200 members, and was a political support for Kalākaua that lasted until his death in 1891. In 2004, the National Museum of Natural History displayed Kalākaua's red-and-yellow feathered Hale Naua ʻahuʻula and feathered kāhili as part of its Hawaiian special exhibit.

Kalākaua's sponsorship of and a brief career in the Hawaiian language press gave him the additional epithet of the "Editor King". From 1861 to 1863, Kalākaua with G. W. Mila, J. W. H. Kauwahi and John K. Kaunamano co-edited Ka Hoku o ka Pakipika (The Star of the Pacific), the first Hawaiian language newspaper solely written by Native Hawaiians without the influence of American missionaries. This nationalist paper focused on Hawaiian topics especially traditional folklore and poetry. In 1870 he also edited the daily newspaper Ka Manawa (Times), which concerned itself with international news, local news and genealogies but only lasted for two months. He also sponsored the literary journal, Ka Hoku o Ke Kai (The Star of the Sea), which ran from 1883 to 1884.

The Hawaiian Music Hall of Fame honored Kalākaua and his brother and sisters as Na Lani ʻEhā ("The Heavenly Four") for their patronage and enrichment of Hawaiʻi's musical culture and history. "Hawaiʻi Ponoʻī" was officially designated the Hawaiʻi state anthem in 1967. Originally titled "Hymn to Kamehameha I", Henri Berger, leader of the Royal Hawaiian Band, wrote the instrumental melody in 1872, influenced by the Prussian anthem "Heil dir im Siegerkranz". Kalākaua added the lyrics in 1874, and the Kawaiahaʻo Church Choir sang it on his birthday that year. In 1876, it became the official anthem of the Kingdom of Hawaiʻi until the overthrow of the monarchy. Other works by the king include "Sweet Lei Lehua", "ʻAkahi Hoʻi", "E Nihi Ka Hele", "Ka Momi", and "Koni Au I Ka Wai". Seven of his songs were published in Ka Buke O Na Leo Mele Hawaii (1888) using the pseudonym "Figgs". He generally wrote only the lyrics for most of his surviving works.

He established diplomatic relations with the Kingdom of Serbia and was awarded the Order of Cross of Takovo.

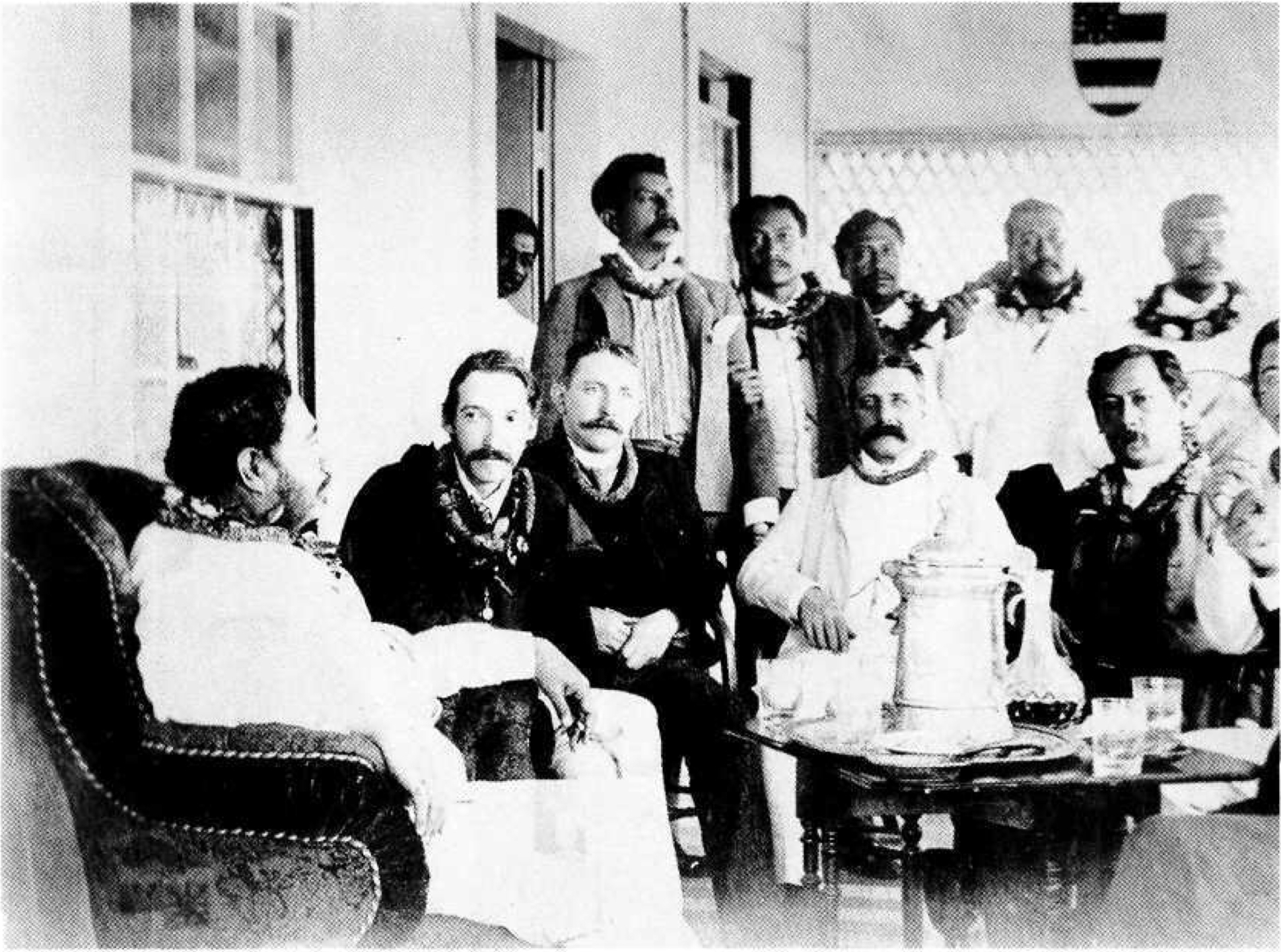
King Kalākaua, Scottish writer Robert Louis Stevenson, and "Kalākaua's Singing Boys", his own personal headed choir, c. 1889

The ukulele was introduced to the Hawaiian islands during the reign of Kalākaua, by Manuel Nunes, José do Espírito Santo, and Augusto Dias, Portuguese immigrants from Madeira and Cape Verde. The king became proficient on the instrument. According to American journalist Mary Hannah Krout and Hawaiʻi resident Isobel Osbourne Strong, wife of artist Joseph Dwight Strong and stepdaughter of Robert Louis Stevenson, he would often play the ukulele and perform meles for his visitors, accompanied by his personal musical group Kalākaua's Singing Boys (aka King's Singing Boys). Strong recalled the Singing Boys as "the best singers and performers on the ukulele and guitar in the whole islands". Kalākaua was inducted into the Ukulele Hall of Fame in 1997.

Kalākaua Avenue was created in March 1905 by the House and Senate of the Hawaiʻi Territorial Legislature. It renamed the highway known as Waikiki Road, "to commemorate the name of his late Majesty Kalākaua, during whose reign Hawaiʻi made great advancement in material prosperity".

The King David Kalakaua Building was listed on the National Register of Historic Places in 1975 under its former name U.S. Post Office, Customhouse, and Courthouse. Located at 335 Merchant Street in Honolulu, it was once the official seat of administration for the Territory of Hawaiʻi. The building was renamed for Kalākaua in 2003.

In 1985, a bronze statue of Kalākaua was donated to the City and County of Honolulu to commemorate the 100-year anniversary of the arrival of the first Japanese laborers after the king's visit to Japan. It was commissioned by the Oahu Kanyaku Imin Centennial Committee on behalf of the Japanese-American community of Hawaiʻi. The statue was designed and created by musician Palani Vaughan, architect Leland Onekea and Native Hawaiian sculptor Sean Kekamakupaa Kaonohiokalani Lee Loy Browne. It is located at the corner of Kalākaua and Kuhio avenues in Waikiki.

In 1988, a cast bronze statue titled "King David Kalākaua" was placed in Kalakaua Park in Hilo, Hawai'i (57" H). It was created by Hawaiian artist Henry Bianchini.

A Hawaiian song about Kalākaua can be heard in the Disney movie Lilo & Stitch when Lilo is introduced in the movie. The mele was written as a mele inoa, its original title being "He Inoa No Kalani Kalākaua Kulele" (a namesong for the chief, Kalākaua). On the Lilo & Stitch soundtrack, it was retitled as "He Mele No Lilo".

=== Notable published works ===
- Na Mele Aimoku, Na Mele Kupuna, a Me Na Mele Ponoi O Ka Moi Kalākaua I. Dynastic Chants, Ancestral Chants, and Personal Chants of King Kalākaua I. (1886). Hawaiian Historical Society, Honolulu, 2001.
- The Legends and Myths of Hawaii: The Fables and Folk-lore of a Strange People. (1888). C.E. Tuttle Company, New York, 1990.

== Honours ==
- Kingdom of Hawaii:
  - Companion of the Order of Kamehameha I, 1867
  - Founder of the Order of Kalākaua, September 28, 1874
  - Founder of the Order of Kapiolani, August 30, 1880
  - Founder of the Order of the Star of Oceania, December 16, 1886
- Austria-Hungary: Commander of the Order of Franz Joseph, 1871; Grand Cross, 1874
- German Empire: Knight of the Red Eagle, 1st Class, April 21, 1878
- Denmark: Grand Cross of the Dannebrog, March 11, 1880
- Sweden–Norway: Commander Grand Cross of the Order of Vasa, February 18, 1881
- Empire of Japan: Collar of the Supreme Order of the Chrysanthemum, March 14, 1881
- Siam: Grand Cross of the Crown of Siam, April 1881
- United Kingdom: Honorary Knight Grand Cross of St Michael and St George, July 28, 1881
- Belgium: Grand Cordon of the Order of Leopold, August 1881
- Kingdom of Portugal: Grand Cross of the Immaculate Conception of Vila Viçosa, August 19, 1881
- Kingdom of Serbia:
  - Grand Cross of the Cross of Takovo, June 28, 1883
  - Grand Cross of St. Sava, June 28, 1883

== Ancestry ==
Ancestors of Kalākaua

8. High Chief Kepoʻokalani
4. High Chief Kamanawa II
9. High Chiefess Alapaʻiwahine
2. High Chief Caesar Kapaʻakea
10. High Chief Kanepawale
5. High Chiefess Kamokuiki
11. High Chiefess Uaua
1. Kalākaua
12. High Chief Kepoʻokalani (= 8)
6. High Chief ʻAikanaka
13. High Chiefess Keohohiwa
3. High Chiefess Analea Keohokālole
14. High Chief Kahoalani Eia
7. High Chiefess Kamaʻeokalani
15. High Chiefess Keakaula

Kalākaua family tree

Key- (k)= Kane (male/husband)
(w)= wahine (female/wife)
Subjects with bold titles, lavender highlighted, bold box= Direct bloodline
Bold title, bold, grey box= Aunts, uncles, cousins line
Bold title, bold white box= European or American (raised to aliʻi status by marriage or monarch's decree)
Regular name and box= makaʻāinana or untitled foreign subject

Kāneikaiwilani (k)
Lonoikahaupu (k)
Keawepoepoe (k)
Kameʻeiamoku (k)
Kepoʻokalani (k)
Kamanawa II (k)
Kapaʻakea (1815–1866)
Kaliokalani (1835–1852)

Kanalohanaui (k)	Keākealani (w)	Ahu-a-ʻI (k)	Piʻilani (w) II	Moana (k)
Kalanikauleleiaiwi (w)	Kauauaʻamahi (k)	Keawe II (k)	Lonomaʻaikanaka (w)	Kauhiahaki (k)	ʻIliki-ā-Moana (w)
Kanoena (w)	Haʻaeamahi (k)	Kekelakekeokalani (w)	Alapaʻi Nui (k)	Keaka (w)	Keeaumoku Nui (k)	Kamakaimoku (w)	Kaeamamao (k) (Note: Genealogy of Liliuokalani, page 400, appendix B, No. 2 Queen of Hawaii, Liliuokalani (1898). Hawaii's Story by Hawaii's Queen. University of Hawaii Press. p. 400. "Kapaakea genealogy.")	Kaolanialiʻi (w)
Kamakaʻeheikuli (w)	Keōua (k)	Kahekili II (k)	Kekuiapoiwa II (w)	Ikuaʻana (w)	Heulu (k)	Moana (w)	Keaweʻopala (k)	Nohomualani (k)
Keaweaheulu (k)	Ululani (w)	Hakau (w)	Kanaʻina (k)	Kauwa (w)	Eia (k)
Alapai (w)	Keohohiwa (w)	Keōpūolani (w)	Kamehameha I	Kalaniʻōpuʻu (k)	Kānekapōlei (w)	Kiʻilaweau (k)	Nāhiʻōleʻa (k)	Kahoʻowaha II (w)	Inaina (w)
Hao (K)	Kailipakalua (w)
Kamokuiki (w)	ʻAikanaka (k)	Kamaeokalani (w)	Kaōleiokū (k)	Keoua (w)	Luahine (w)	Kalaʻimamahu	Kaheiheimālie
Kamehameha II	Kamehameha III	Kekūanaōʻa (k)	Kahalaiʻa; Luanuʻu (k)	Pauahi (w)	Kīnaʻu (w)	Pākī (k)	Kōnia (w)	Kanaʻina II	Kaʻahumanu III
Keohokālole (1816–1869)	Keʻelikōlani (w)	Kamehameha IV	Kamehameha V	Kaʻahumanu IV	Pauahi Bishop (w)	Bishop (k)	Lunalilo (k)
Kalākaua (1836–1891)	Kapiʻolani (1834–1899)	Liliʻuokalani (1838–1917)	Dominis (1832–1891)	Kaʻiulani (1842–?)	Kaʻiminaʻauao (1845–1848)	Cleghorn (1835–1910)	Likelike (1851–1887)	Leleiohoku II (1854–1877)
Kaʻiulani (1875–1899)

== See also ==
- Coins of the Hawaiian dollar
- Kalākaua's Cabinet ministers
- Kalākaua's Privy Council of State
- Kalākaua's 1881 world tour

== Notes ==
=== Citations ===
Royal titles
Preceded by Lunalilo	King of Hawaiʻi; 1874–1891	Succeeded by Liliʻuokalani
