= John William Elliott Maikai =

American lawyer

Member of the Kingdom of Hawaii House of Representatives for the island of Oahu
- In office 1848, 1850, 1853, 1854, 1855, 1856

Member of the Kingdom of Hawaii House of Nobles
- In office October 3, 1859 – May 27, 1860

Personal details
- Born: c. 1828
- Died: May 27, 1860 (aged 32) Honolulu, Oahu
- Education: Lahainaluna Seminary

Military service
- Allegiance: Kingdom of Hawaii
- Branch/service: Hawaiian Army
- Rank: Major, Adjutant General

Major John William Elliott Maikai (c. 1828 – May 27, 1860) was a lawyer, politician, and military officer of the Kingdom of Hawaii. He served as an aide to King Kamehameha III and was the Akukana Kenela or Adjutant General of the Hawaiian Army during the reigns of King Kamehameha III and Kamehameha IV.

== Life and career ==
He was the son of a man named Ehu, a recipient of the Great Māhele who owned land in the Mānoa Valley. Maikai became part of the early generations of Hawaiian youths educated at the Lahainaluna Seminary on the island of Maui by the American Protestant missionary Lorrin Andrews. He graduated in 1845 with high honors.

He initially went into governmental service as a secretary of Mataio Kekūanaōʻa, the Governor of Oahu. He later became a lawyer and was appointed a district justice, though he continued his law practice and working as a member of the Hawaiian bar. American diplomat David L. Gregg, who witnessed one of his cases, noted, "I thought he displayed extraordinary acuteness in the management of the case. His speech to the jury was graceful and apparently eloquent."

He was elected a member of the House of Representatives, the lower house of the legislature of the Kingdom of Hawaii, and sat in the legislative assembly sessions of 1848, 1850, 1853, 1854, 1855, and 1856. His contemporaries noted, "Maikai was one of the most eloquent and able members of the House of Representatives, and his liberal policy and tact in debate gave him an influence to which few of his compeers attained."

He became an aide-de-camp on the military staff to King Kamehameha III. He was enlisted by Lieutenant Commander Prince Alexander Liholiho, who would later succeed to the throne as King Kamehameha IV, to help re-organize the Hawaiian Army. He initially held the rank of Brevet Captain of Infantry. On August 25, 1854, Prince Alexander Liholiho appointed him as Akukana Kenela, or Adjutant General to the Forces of the Hawaiian Islands to succeed the previous office holder Major Francis Funk. He was placed in charge of all military accounts for the kingdom and held this post until his death. He later achieved the rank of Major. One of his protégés during this period was the future King Kalākaua who served as the military secretary to Maikai.

On October 3, 1859, he was appointed as a member of the Privy Council of State, the advisory council to King Kamehameha IV. He was also appointed a life member of the House of Nobles but only participated in the extraordinary session in 1859 in which Prince Albert Edward Kamehameha was conferred as heir-apparent to the throne. He did not get a chance to sit in the legislative session of 1860.

Maikai died at his home in Honolulu, on May 27, 1860, at thirty-two. On June 28, 1861, John Owen Dominis was appointed as his successor to the position of Adjutant General.

== Marriage and descendants ==
His wife was the High Chiefess Abigail Kapoʻoloku (or Kepoʻoloku) Maikai, who survived him and lived into the reign of King Kalākaua.

Their son Samuel Ikuwa Ulumaheihei Maikai would later serve as a lieutenant in the Royal Household Guard, a sub-lieutenant of the Royal Hawaiian Navy on HHMS Kaimiloa, and a military aide during the reign of King Kalākaua. By his first marriage to Annie Palekaluhi Kaikioʻewa (1855–1906), sister of Edward Kamakau Lilikalani, he had a daughter named Helina Kaiwaokalani. By his second marriage to Wahineopio, Samuel had three children: David Unualoha Maikai (1886–1933), Samuela Kahilolaamea Maikai (1886–1916), and Abigaila Kalanikuikepooloku Maikai.

== Bibliography ==
- Biographical Sketch of His Majesty King Kalakaua. Honolulu: P. C. Advertiser Steam Printing Office. 1884. pp. 72–74. OCLC 12787107.
- Forbes, David W., ed. (2001). Hawaiian National Bibliography, 1780–1900, Volume 3: 1851–1880. Vol. 3. Honolulu: University of Hawaii Press. ISBN 978-0-8248-2503-4. OCLC 123279964.
- Gregg, David L. (1982). King, Pauline (ed.). The Diaries of David Lawrence Gregg: An American Diplomat in Hawaii, 1853–1858. Honolulu: Hawaiian Historical Society. ISBN 9780824808617. OCLC 8773139.
- Hawaii (1918). Lydecker, Robert Colfax (ed.). Roster Legislatures of Hawaii, 1841–1918. Honolulu: Hawaiian Gazette Company. OCLC 60737418.
- McKinzie, Edith Kawelohea (1983). Stagner, Ishmael W. (ed.). Hawaiian Genealogies: Extracted from Hawaiian Language Newspapers. Vol. 1. Honolulu: University of Hawaii Press. pp. 33–38. ISBN 0-939154-28-5. OCLC 12555087.
- Osorio, Jon Kamakawiwoʻole (2002). Dismembering Lāhui: A History of the Hawaiian Nation to 1887. Honolulu: University of Hawaii Press. ISBN 0-8248-2549-7. OCLC 48579247.
- Poepoe, Joseph M.; Brown, George (1891). Ka Moolelo o ka Moi Kalakaua I. Honolulu. OCLC 16331688.
- Taylor, Albert Pierce (1922). Under Hawaiian Skies: A Narrative of the Romance, Adventure and History of the Hawaiian Islands. Honolulu: Advertiser Publishing Company, Ltd. OCLC 479709.
- Thrum, Thomas G., ed. (1890). "Manoa Valley – Description, Historic and Legendary". 1890. Honolulu: Honolulu Star-Bulletin: 110–116. hdl:10524/31851. OCLC 4386034.
- Zambucka, Kristin (2002). Kalakaua: Hawaiʻi's Last King. Honolulu: Māna Publishing Company. ISBN 978-0-931897-04-7. OCLC 123305738.

Military offices
Preceded by Francis Funk	Adjutant General to the Forces of the Hawaiian Islands; 1854–1860	Succeeded by John Owen Dominis
