= Kapaʻakea =

Hawaiian chief (1815–1866)

Caesar Kapaʻakea
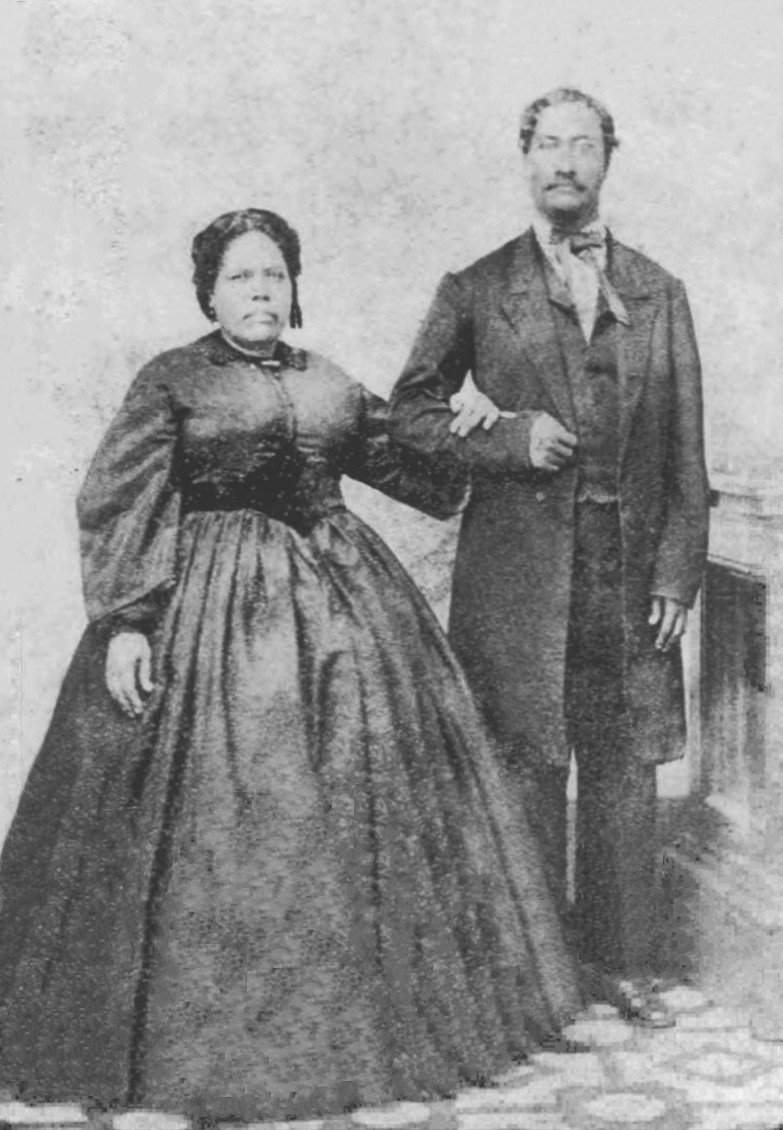
- Born: c. 1815; Kuiaha, Maui, Hawaiʻi
- Died: November 13, 1866 (aged 51); Honolulu, Oʻahu, Hawaiʻi
- Burial: December 9, 1866; Kawaiahaʻo Church Cemetery; November 30, 1875; Mauna ʻAla Royal Mausoleum
- Spouse: Analea Keohokālole
- Issue: James Kaliokalani; King David Kalākaua; Queen Lydia Liliʻuokalani; Anna Kaʻiulani; Kaʻiminaʻauao; Miriam Likelike; William Pitt Leleiohoku II
Names
- Kaisera (Caesar) Kaluaiku Kamakaʻehukai Kahana Keola Kapaʻakea
- House: Kalākaua
- Father: High Chief Kamanawa II
- Mother: High Chiefess Kamokuiki

Caesar Kaluaiku Kamakaʻehukai Kahana Keola Kapaʻakea (1815 – November 13, 1866) was a Hawaiian chief who was the patriarch of the House of Kalākaua that ruled the Kingdom of Hawaiʻi from 1874 to 1893. The name Kapaʻakea translates as "the coral or limestone surface" in Hawaiian.

== Biography ==
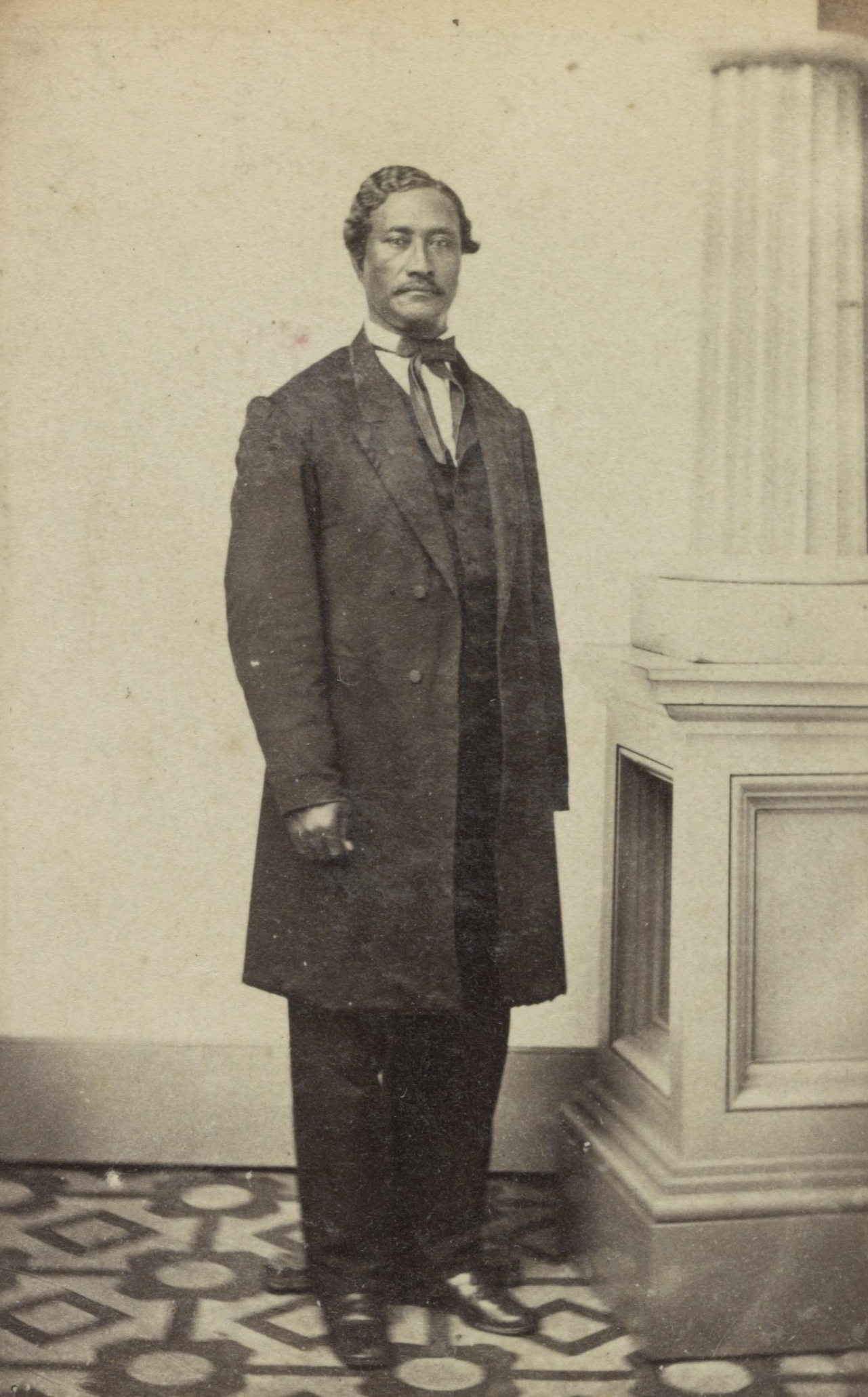
Kapaʻakea

Kapaʻakea was born in Kuiaha, Maui, about 1815. His Christian name was spelled several different ways, such as "Ceaser" in the state archives, or "Kaisera" in the style of the Hawaiian language. His father was High Chief Kamanawa II and mother was High Chiefess Kamokuiki. He was a great-grandson of one of the five Kona chiefs who supported Kamehameha I in his uprising against Kīwalaʻō, Kame'eiamoku, one of the royal twins on the coat of arms of Hawaii. His family was relatively of high rank and reputation until it was tarnished in 1840 when his father murdered his mother and was consequently executed. In the Great Mahele of 1848, he received few lands parceled out to the aliʻi or high chiefs. His siblings were the High Chief Joel Mahoe and the High Chiefess Kekahili.

He married the High Chiefess Analea Keohokālole in 1835. She was of a higher rank than he. They were cousins and their union was considered sacred because of their close blood relationship. He and Keohokālole had over 10 children although several died young. He was father of James Kaliokalani, future King David Kalākaua, future Queen Liliʻuokalani, Anna Kaʻiulani, Kaʻiminaʻauao, Likelike and Leleiohoku. Each of his children were hānai or adopted by different noble families. Liliʻuokalani was given to Abner Pākī and Laura Kōnia. Kaliokalani was given to his maternal grandfather ʻAikanaka. Kalākaua was given to the High Chiefess Haʻaheo Kaniu. Leleiohoku was given to the Princess Ruth Keʻelikōlani. Kaʻiulani was given to the Kekauʻōnohi. Kaʻiminiaʻauao was given to Kamehameha III and Queen Kalama. Likelike was given to a family in Kona.

He served in the House of Nobles from April 4, 1845, to his death and Privy Council from 1846. He also commanded the Punchbowl Battery, an artillery unit formerly under his father-in-law and held the rank of colonel Kapaʻakea died November 13, 1866, aged 51 years, at Honolulu, Oahu. Initially buried in the Kawaiahaʻo Cemetery, his son Kalākaua had his remains removed to the Royal Mausoleum of Hawaii on November 30, 1875.
