= J. W. H. Kauwahi =

Early LDS church leader, member of the Hawaiian legislature, and author

J. W. H. Kauwahi (1824–1870) was an early leader of the Church of Jesus Christ of Latter-day Saints (LDS Church) in Hawaii beginning in 1851 and was a member of the legislature of the Kingdom of Hawaii. He was the author of the first published dictionary of Hawaiian.

Kauwahi was one of those converted and baptized into the LDS Church through the efforts of George Q. Cannon. Kauwahi was baptized on 17 August 1851 by William Farrer, one of the first ten LDS missionaries in Hawaii. At the time, Kauwahi lived on Maui and was a member of the legislature of the Kingdom of Hawaii, and had good relations with King Kamehameha III. He later went with Philip Lewis to build up the LDS Church on Kauai. For much of 1853, Kauwahi worked with Cannon on doing a close read of the Hawaiian translation of the Book of Mormon that Cannon and Jonathan Napela had created. He was ordained an elder on 22 April 1853. Kauwahi and Uaua took a letter to Kamehameha III seeking an audience with him for representatives of the LDS Church. Kamehameha seemed willing to do this, but his ministers opposed the plan. In 1854, Kauwahi was arrested for bigamy, but his bail was paid by LDS missionaries. However, it has been said that sexual promiscuity was common among the native Hawaiian elders and that Kauwahi regularly committed adultery, but that he and other native elders were more quickly forgiven than American LDS members because the leadership viewed them as essential to the native Hawaiian missions.

Kauwahi seems to have left the LDS Church by 1856, and, on 31 January 1857, a pamphlet co-authored with fellow apostate John Hyde Jr. was published in Hawaiian which was "slandering and vilifying the Church to the lowest grade," according to Mormon mission historians. In 1857, a dictionary of the Hawaiian language written by Kauwahi was published.
