= Francis Funk =

American lawyer

Member of the Kingdom of Hawaii House of Representatives
- In office 1851–1853
- Monarch: Kamehameha III
- Nickname: Franz Funk

Military service
- Allegiance: Kingdom of Hawaii
- Branch/service: Hawaiian Army
- Rank: Major, Adjutant General

Francis Funk or Franz Funk (fl. 1853) was a lawyer, politician, sheriff, and military officer of the Kingdom of Hawaii. He held the rank of Major and served as the Akukana Kenela or Adjutant General of the Hawaiian Army during the reign of King Kamehameha III.

== Life and career ==
Prior to 1851, he worked as a lawyer and was a deputy sheriff during the 1840s. According to later writings, he was a former Prussian soldier. In the election of 1851, when direct suffrage was first established, he was elected a member of the House of Representatives, the lower house of the legislature of the Kingdom of Hawaii, and sat in the legislative sessions of 1851, 1852, and 1853. From 1851 to 1852, he served as Sheriff of the islands of Kauai and later Hawaii. In July 1853, he was mistakenly referred to as the United States Consul at Hawaii by a resident of Benicia, California.

Funk joined the service of the Hawaiian military during the end of the reign of Kamehameha III when it was going under reform by his heir-apparent, Prince Alexander Liholiho, who would succeed as King Kamehameha IV in 1855. On July 13, 1853, he was appointed by the King as a Major of Infantry and assigned the duties of Akukana Kenela, or Adjutant General to the Forces of the Hawaiian Islands by Prince Liholiho, who was the Lieutenant Commander at this time. Major Funk was placed in charge of all military accounts for the kingdom and held this post until John William Elliott Maikai was appointed as his successor in 1854.

One of his protégés during this period was the future King Kalākaua who received his first military training when he was fourteen years old under Captain Funk and later served as the military secretary to his successor Major Maikai. Letters between Major Funk and Prince Liholiho on military matters are preserved in the Hawaii State Archives.

In John William Holmes' article "A Case of Eye Troubles", published in the Hawaiian Journal of History, it was stated that Funk had intermittent eye troubles, possibly ocular syphilis, and received medical treatments from Robert Crichton Wyllie. Holmes noted: "Francis Funk, had a peripatetic and spotty career in the islands; one is tempted to label this specimen a typical adventurer whose constitution contained more brass than gold; certainly he was plunged, periodically, into difficulties not entirely fortuitous."

== Bibliography ==
- Allen, Helena G. (1995). Kalakaua: Renaissance King. Honolulu: Mutual Publishing. ISBN 978-1-56647-059-9. OCLC 35083815.
- Biographical Sketch of His Majesty King Kalakaua. Honolulu: P. C. Advertiser Steam Printing Office. 1884. pp. 72–74. OCLC 12787107.
- Forbes, David W., ed. (2001). Hawaiian National Bibliography, 1780–1900, Volume 3: 1851–1880. Vol. 3. Honolulu: University of Hawaii Press. ISBN 978-0-8248-2503-4. OCLC 123279964.
- Greer, Richard A. (1968). "Sketch of Ke-Kua-Nohu, 1845–1850, with Notes of Other Times Before and After". The Hawaiian Journal of History. 2. Honolulu: Hawaiian Historical Society: 3–41. hdl:10524/226. OCLC 60626541.
- Greer, Richard A. (1995). "A. G. Abell's Hawaiian Interlude". The Hawaiian Journal of History. 29. Honolulu: Hawaiian Historical Society: 57–74. hdl:10524/441. OCLC 60626541.
- Hawaii (1918). Lydecker, Robert Colfax (ed.). Roster Legislatures of Hawaii, 1841–1918. Honolulu: Hawaiian Gazette Company. OCLC 60737418.
- Osorio, Jon Kamakawiwoʻole (2002). Dismembering Lāhui: A History of the Hawaiian Nation to 1887. Honolulu: University of Hawaii Press. ISBN 0-8248-2549-7. OCLC 48579247.
- Poepoe, Joseph M.; Brown, George (1891). Ka Moolelo o ka Moi Kalakaua I. Honolulu. OCLC 16331688.
- Wyllie, Robert Crichton (1967). Holmes, William John (ed.). "A Case of Eye Trouble". The Hawaiian Journal of History. 1. Honolulu: Hawaiian Historical Society: 87–89. hdl:10524/158. OCLC 60626541. PMID 11635007.
- Zambucka, Kristin (2002). Kalakaua: Hawaiʻi's Last King. Honolulu: Māna Publishing Company. ISBN 978-0-931897-04-7. OCLC 123305738.

Military offices
Unknown	Adjutant General to the Forces of the Hawaiian Islands; 1853–1854	Succeeded by J. W. E. Maikai
