= Albert Kamehameha =

Crown Prince of the Hawaiian Islands (1858–1862)

- Crown Prince of the Hawaiian Islands
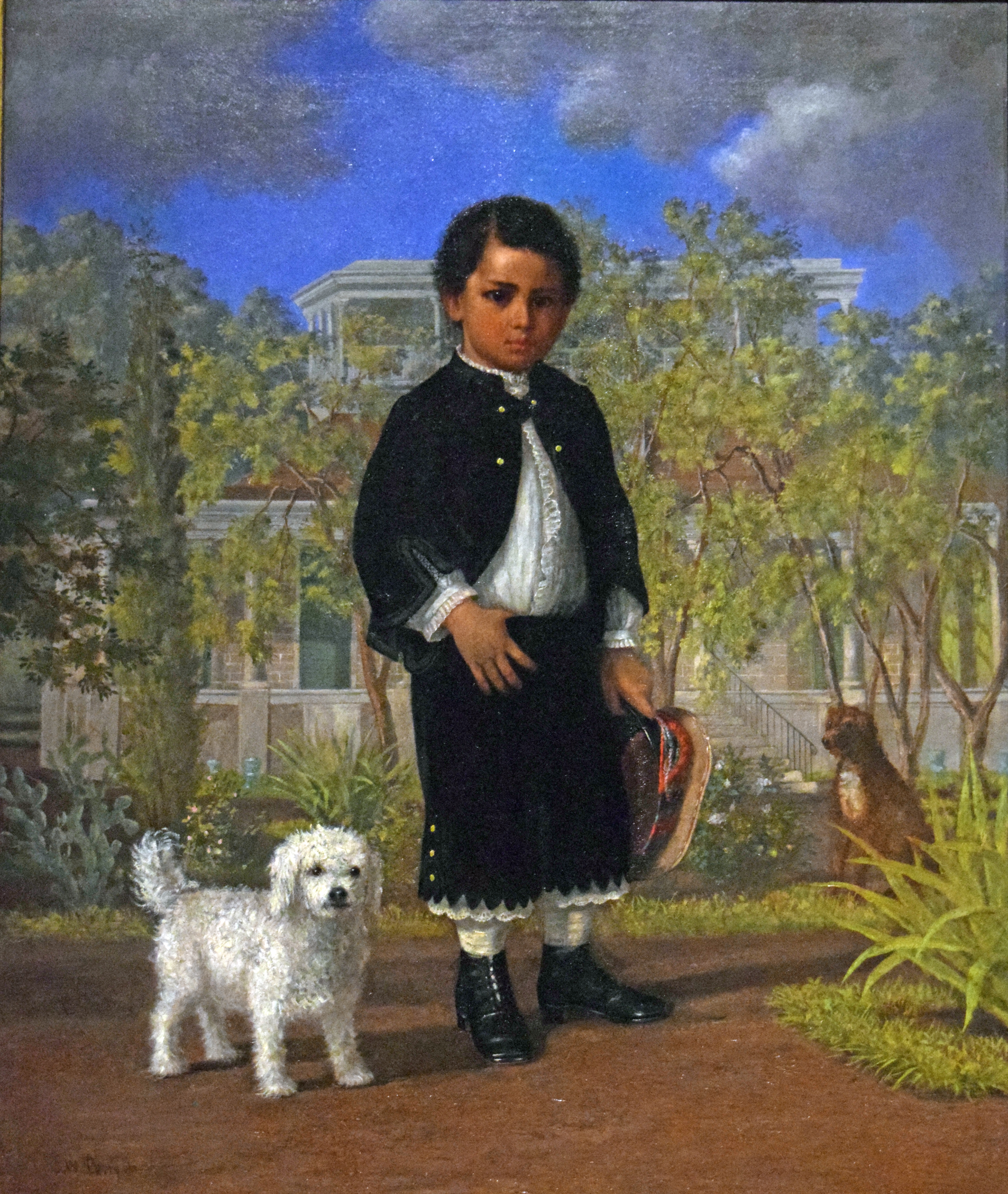
- Painting by Enoch Wood Perry, Jr. of the Prince with his dog outside the royal palace.
- Born: May 20, 1858; Ihikapukalani, Honolulu, Oʻahu
- Died: August 27, 1862 (aged 4) ʻIolani Palace, Honolulu, Oʻahu
- Burial: September 7, 1862; February 4, 1864; Mauna ʻAla Royal Mausoleum
Names
- Albert Edward Kauikeaouli Kaleiopapa a Kamehameha
- House: House of Kamehameha
- Father: Kamehameha IV
- Mother: Emma Rooke
- Religion: Church of Hawaii

Prince Albert Kamehameha, formally Albert Edward Kauikeaouli Kaleiopapa a Kamehameha (May 20, 1858 – August 27, 1862), was the only son of King Kamehameha IV and Queen Emma of Hawaii, who during his short life was the Crown Prince of the Kingdom of Hawaiʻi. He was the godson of Queen Victoria.

== Early life ==
He was born May 20, 1858, in the residence of Ihikapukalani that his father had built for his mother. The residence, oddly, had two names; the makai side was known as Kauluhinano, and the mauka side was known as Ihikapukalani. Created Crown prince and heir apparent to the throne of the Kingdom of Hawaiʻi on May 24, 1858, he was styled "His Royal Highness the Prince of Hawaii" by the Privy Council. Adored by the native Hawaiian public, he was affectionately known as Ka Haku O Hawaiʻi ("the Lord of Hawaiʻi") and was believed to be last hope of the Kamehameha Dynasty. His birth was celebrated for many days not only in Honolulu, but throughout the islands. He was the first child to be born to a reigning Hawaiian monarch since Prince Keawe Aweʻula-o-Kalani in 1839, son of Kamehameha III. He was the last ever to be born from any reigning Hawaiian monarch.

He was given the Hawaiian name Kauikeaouli Kaleiopapa after his adoptive grandfather Kauikeaouli who reigned as Kamehameha III. Translated from the Hawaiian language it means "the beloved child of a long line of chiefs, a sign in the heavens." The King and Queen called their son "Baby". However, when they spoke of him to their kahu (caretakers), it was as Kauikeaouli, which the Hawaiian people also used. He was named Albert Edward in honor of Albert Edward, Prince of Wales, the future King Edward VII of the United Kingdom. Despite the great differences in their kingdoms, Queen Emma and Queen Victoria would exchange letters and become lifelong friends.

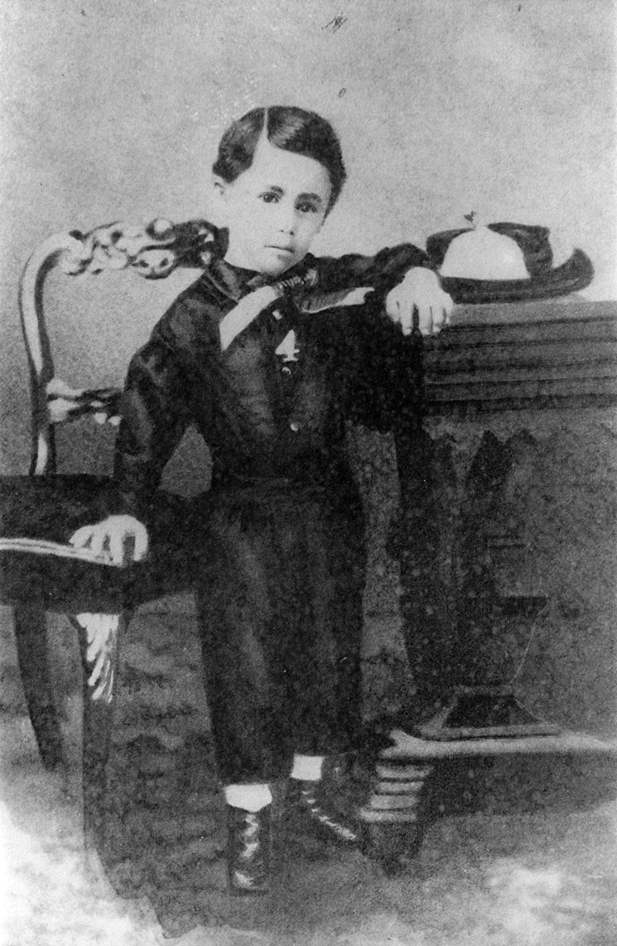
Prince Albert in his Company Four red fireman uniform.

Ten days after his birth, Mary Allen, second wife of the Chief Justice of the Supreme Court Elisha Hunt Allen, had a son Frederick. The two children became playmates, and Allen described the prince as "an unusually sweet child, gentle and gentlemanly in his manners, bright and precocious and of a most happy, serene temperament".

Albert during his life was also made an honorary member of Fire Engine Company Number Four in Honolulu and was given his own Company Four red uniform. It was said that he would rather become a fireman. His four birthdays were national holidays.

== Death ==
In August 1862, the usually serene child became restless, and his medical condition got progressively worse. The newspapers of the time reported the illness as "brain fever," now known as meningitis. Writing much later, Queen Liliʻuokalani blamed the father for putting the child under a cold-water faucet as punishment for throwing a tantrum over a pair of boots. The parents did mistake a fever for sunstroke. A modern medical historian and Honolulu physician analyzed the possible causes of Albert's death. They concluded the Prince most likely died from a case of appendicitis. Both the local and British naval doctors did not know the cause nor the treatment of his illness.

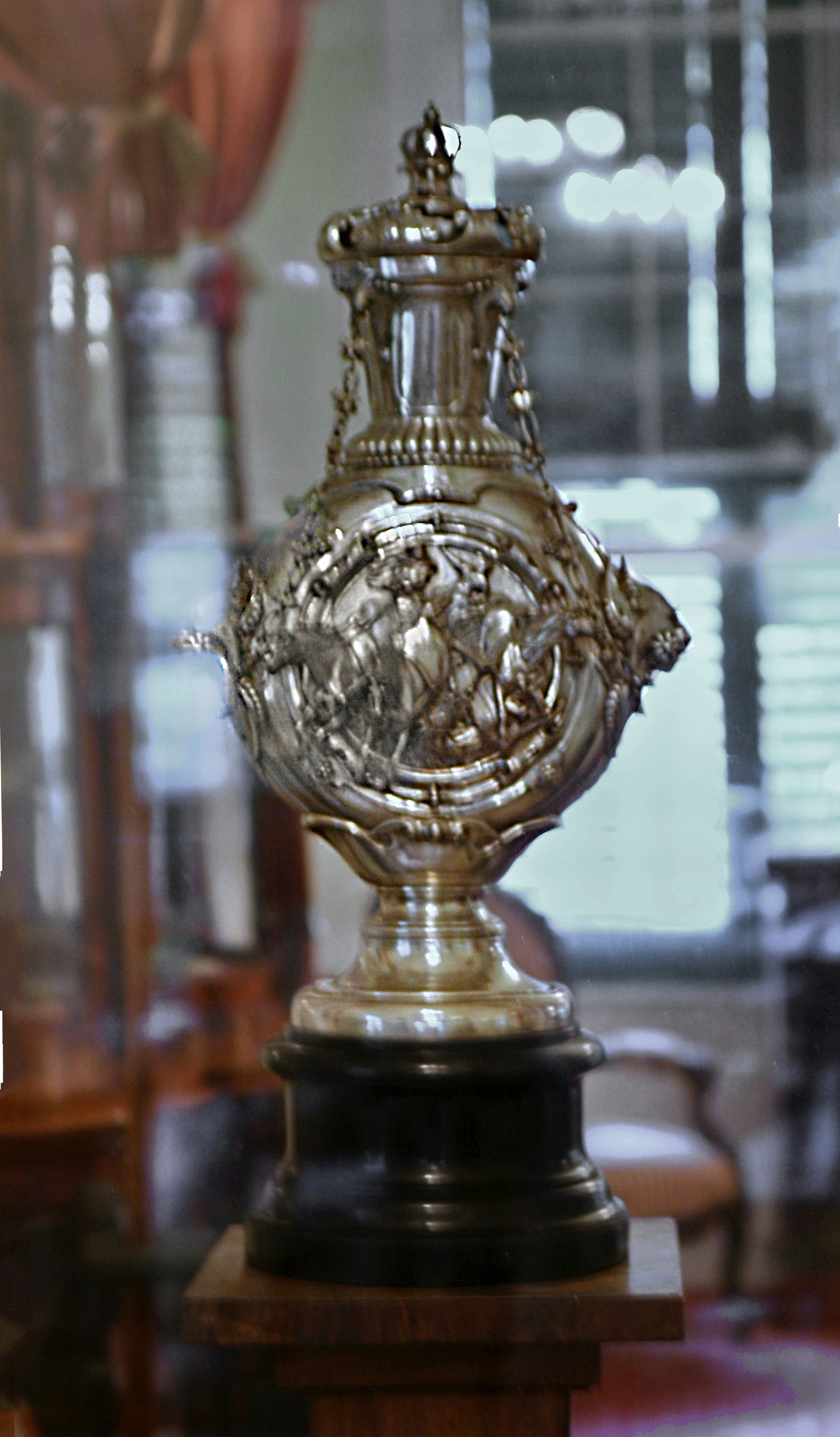
Queen Victoria consented to being Albert's godmother and sent as a baptismal gift an elaborate silver christening cup, about three feet high.

As the prince's condition declined, Kamehameha IV and Queen Emma made a personal request to Queen Victoria to send a bishop from the Anglican Church to baptize the prince. They also requested Queen Victoria to be his godmother. Queen Victoria consented to both requests, and sent as a baptismal gift an elaborate silver christening cup, about three feet high. Bishop Thomas Nettleship Staley was sent but would not arrive until October. As the prince grew sicker, the American minister Ephraim W. Clark from Kawaiahaʻo Church baptized the child on August 23. The Episcopal liturgy was used with the British Commissioner William Webb Follett Synge standing in for the godparents.

The Prince died on August 27, 1862, at the palace, four days after his baptism. His parents were grief-stricken, as they knelt by the side of the Prince's bed. The Queen took her dead boy in her arms and, weeping over him, said to him, "My Baby, my own Baby and you did not know me!" Prince Albert's funeral was held on September 7, 1862. He was temporarily placed in a temporary tomb in front of the palace below a tamarind tree. Before the lid of the coffin closed, the King removed the star of diamonds from his uniform and laid it on the chest of his only son.

Afterwards, the King fell into despair, blaming himself for the loss of his son. The Queen rarely left the grave of her child and was given the name Kaleleokalani (The Flight of the Heavenly Chief), in memory of Albert, by her husband. The King then ordered the construction of the Royal Mausoleum in Nuʻuanu Valley to house his son's body, since the old mausoleum had become too full. Today, the mausoleum is burial site of most of the members of the Hawaiian royal family. The King's depression was so severe that he considered abdicating the throne. A year later, he would die as well. To express her grief, Queen Emma changed her name to Kaleleo(n)ālani "Flight of the Heavenly Chief(s)," to symbolize her double loss.

== Legacy ==
His death left his father without a constitutionally recognized heir. Consequently, after his father's death in 1864, the Kuhina Nui (Albert's aunt) had to fill in the vacant office of head of state for a day until the Legislature could decide upon the accession of his uncle as king. Besides the Royal Mausoleum, the four-year-old prince left other marks on Hawaii. The area of Princeville on the island of Kauaʻi was named in honor of the young prince by Scotsman Robert Crichton Wyllie, Minister of Foreign Affairs to Kamehameha III and IV, after a visit by the Kamehameha IV family in 1860. In 1867 Elisha Allen bought the property and developed it into a sugarcane plantation. It was developed into a resort with its main street named Ka Huku Road at 22°13′24″N 159°29′7″W.

The road to Kamehameha III's birthplace is named Kaleiopapa Street near Keauhou Bay at 19°33′29″N 155°57′38″W on the island of Hawaiʻi. The Leiopapa a Kamehameha Building (the State Office Tower) in downtown Honolulu is also named for him. According to local folklore, his ghost is said to inhabit the building at 235 South Beretania Street, 21°18′33″N 157°51′29″W.

== Family tree ==
=== Paternal ===
Paternal ancestry

Kamehameha family tree

Kalaniʻōpuʻu (k)	Kalola (w)	Keōua (k)	Kekuʻiapoiwa II (w)	Kānekapōlei (w)
Kīwalaʻō	Kekuiapoiwa Liliha
Keōpūolani	Kamehameha I (The Great) (died 1819)	Kalākua Kaheiheimālie	Kaʻahumanu (1819–1832)
Liholiho; Kamehameha II (1819–1824)	Kamāmalu	Keouawahine	Pauli Kaʻōleiokū _{*Paternity is in question as daughter and mother both claim Kalaniopuu as the father.}	Kahailiopua; Luahine
Kauikeaouli; Kamehameha III (1825–1854)	Kalama	Elizabeth Kīnaʻu; Kaʻahumanu II	Mataio; Kekūanaōʻa	Pauahi	Laura Kōnia	Abner Pākī
Keaweaweʻulaokalani I	Keaweaweʻulaokalani II
Queen Emma	Alexander Liholiho; Kamehameha IV (1854–1863)	Lot Kapuāiwa; Kamehameha V (1863–1872)	Victoria Kamāmalu; Kaʻahumanu IV (1855–1863)	Ruth Keʻelikōlani	Charles Reed; Bishop	Bernice Pauahi; Bishop
Albert Kamehameha	John William Pitt Kīnaʻu	Keolaokalani Davis

=== Maternal ===
Maternal ancestry

John Young (Hawaii) family tree

Keliʻimaikaʻi (died 1809)	Kalikoʻokalani	Kalaipaihala
Kaʻōanāʻeha (died 1850)
Henry C. Lewis	Fanny Kekelaokalani (1806–1880)	George Naʻea (1797–1852)
Mary Paʻaʻāina (1833–1853)	James Augustus Griswold (1823–?)	Dr. T. C. B. Rooke (1806–1858)
House of Kamehameha
Queen Emma (1836–1885)	Kamehameha IV (1836–1885)	Kamehameha III (1813–1854)
Albert Kamehameha (1858–1862)	Kiwalaʻo (died 1851)

Robert Young	Grace
Davis Family
John Young (1742–1835)	Namokuelua (died 1804)
Robert (1796–1813?)	Haʻale	James Kānehoa (1797–1851)	Sarah Kaniaulono (1797–1867)
Jane Lahilahi	Nuʻuanu
Grace Kamaʻikuʻi (1808–1866)	Governor Cox Keʻeaumoku (1784–1824)
Samuel Nuʻuanu
Jane Lahilahi (1813–1862)	Joshua Kaʻeo (c. 1808–1858)	Keoni Ana (1810–1857)	Julia Alapaʻi (died 1849)
Albert Kūnuiākea (1851–1903)	Mary Lonokahikini (1851–1904)	Peter Kekuaokalani (1836–1880)	Keliʻimaikaʻi "Alebada" (died 1851)

Notes:
- Apple, Russel A. (1978). "Appendix A: Young Family Geneology". Pahukanilua: Homestead of John Young: Kawaihae, Kohala, Island of Hawaiʻi : Historical Data Section of the Historic Structure Report. Honolulu: National Park Office, Hawaii State Office. pp. 39–41. OCLC 4962701.
- "John Young's Family". The Daily Bulletin. Vol. XV, no. 51. Honolulu. March 2, 1891. p. 2.
- Kanahele, George S. (1999). Emma: Hawaii's Remarkable Queen. Honolulu: University of Hawaii Press. p. 5. ISBN 978-0-8248-2240-8. OCLC 40890919.
- McKinzie, Edith Kawelohea (1983). Stagner, Ishmael W. (ed.). Hawaiian Genealogies: Extracted from Hawaiian Language Newspapers. Vol. 1. Honolulu: University of Hawaii Press. pp. 38–39. ISBN 0-939154-28-5. OCLC 12555087.

== Bibliography ==
- Iʻaukea, Curtis Piʻehu (1930). "Reminiscences of the Court of Kamehameha IV and Queen Emma". Hawaiian Journal of History. Honolulu: Hawaiian Historical Society: 17–27. hdl:10524/961.
- Kanahele, George S. (1999). Emma: Hawaii's Remarkable Queen. Honolulu: University of Hawaii Press. ISBN 0-8248-2240-4.
- Liliuokalani (1898). Hawaii's Story by Hawaii's Queen, Liliuokalani. Boston: Lee and Shepard. ISBN 978-0-548-22265-2.
- Parker, David "Kawika" (2008). "Crypts of the Ali`i The Last Refuge of the Hawaiian Royalty". Tales of Our Hawaiʻi (PDF). Honolulu: Alu Like, Inc. OCLC 309392477. Archived from the original (PDF) on November 11, 2013.
- Peterson, Barbara Bennett (1984). Notable Women of Hawaii. Honolulu: University of Hawaii Press. ISBN 0-8248-0820-7.
- Morris, Alfred D. (1994). "Death of the Prince of Hawai'i: A Retrospective Diagnosis". Hawaiian Journal of History. 28. Honolulu: Hawaiian Historical Society: 17–27. hdl:10524/395.
