= Kalākua Kaheiheimālie =

Queen Consort of Hawaii (d. 1842)

- Queen Consort of Hawaiian Islands
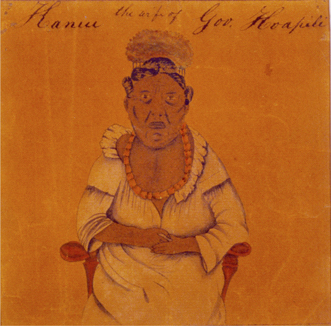
- Hoapili Wahine, watercolor by Clarissa Chapman Armstrong
- Born: c. 1778; Hāna, Maui
- Died: 16 January 1842 (aged 63–64); Lahaina, Maui
- Burial: Mokuʻula then Waineʻe Cemetery
- Spouse: Kalaʻimamahu; Kamehameha I Ulumāheihei Hoapili
- Issue: Kekāuluohi; Liholiho-i-Kaiwi-o-Kamehameha; Kamehameha Kapauaiwa; Kamāmalu; Kīnaʻu
Names
- Miriam Kalākua Kaheiheimālie Hoapili-Wahine
- House: Kamehameha
- Father: Keʻeaumoku Pāpaʻiahiahi
- Mother: Nāmāhānaʻi Kaleleokalani

Kalākua Kaheiheimālie, later known as Hoapili Wahine (c. 1778–1842) was a member of Hawaiian royalty who was one of the queen consorts at the founding of the Kingdom of Hawaii. She was the mother of another queen consort, and grandmother of two future kings. Some sources call her Kaheiheimaile rather than Kaheiheimālie. "Mālie" means serene while the "maile" is the vine Alyxia olivaeformis. The second spelling seems to be older and more appropriate.

== Life ==
She was born c. 1778 into a noble (ali'i) family of Maui. Her father was Keʻeaumoku Pāpaʻiahiahi, a noble from Hawaiʻi Island. Her mother was Nāmāhānaʻi Kaleleokalani, the former consort of her half-brother the late king of Maui, Kamehameha Nui. From her mother she was a member of the royal house of Maui. Her siblings included Hawaiʻi island Governor John Adams Kuakini, Queen Kaʻahumanu, Maui Governor George Cox Kahekili Keʻeaumoku II, and Lydia Namahana Piʻia. Her father became an advisor and friend to Kamehameha I, eventually becoming royal governor of Maui. He arranged for her sister Kaʻahumanu to marry the king when she was thirteen; she would be the most powerful leader of the kingdom for several decades.

First Kaheiheimālie married Prince Kalaʻimamahu, Chief Priest of ʻIo and Kāne. He was a brother of Kamehameha I. They divorced around 1795 and she married her former brother-in-law King Kamehameha I in a ceremony known as Hoao-Wohi. She was part of the court of Kamehameha I that met George Vancouver during his expedition in 1794 and agreed to the first treaty with Great Britain.

She had two sons and two daughters by her second marriage to Kamehameha I. Her first son Prince Liholiho-i-Kaiwi-o-Kamehameha was born about 1795 and died as an infant, and second son Prince Kamehameha Kapauaiwa was born about 1801 and died as an infant. Her daughter Kamāmalu (c. 1802–1824) married Liholiho and became Queen consort when Liholiho became King Kamehameha II. Her youngest daughter Kīnaʻu (c. 1805–1839) succeed her aunt Kaʻahumanu, Kalākua's sister, as Kuhina Nui, co-ruling Hawaii with Kamehameha II. Her daughter from her first marriage with Kalaimamahu was Kekāuluohi (c. 1794–1845) who succeeded Kīnaʻuas the third Kuhina Nui, styled as Kaʻahumanu III.

Through her daughters Kīnaʻu and Kekāuluohi she was grandmother of three more kings: Kamehameha IV, Kamehameha V, and Lunalilo.

She married for the third time at Honolulu, October 19, 1823, to Ulumāheihei Hoapili who was the Governor of Maui. She became a late convert to Christianity and took the name "Miriam" along with her oldest daughter. She was described as physically being "...tall and gigantic" like her siblings. She was known as Hoapili-wahine or "Mrs. Hoapili". She served as Governor of Maui 1840–1842 after her husband's death, and was a founding member of the House of Nobles in 1841. She died on Maui, January 16, 1842. She is buried at Waineʻe Cemetery along with her last husband Hoapili.

=== Family tree ===
Kamehameha family tree

Kalaniʻōpuʻu (k)	Kalola (w)	Keōua (k)	Kekuʻiapoiwa II (w)	Kānekapōlei (w)
Kīwalaʻō	Kekuiapoiwa Liliha
Keōpūolani	Kamehameha I (The Great) (died 1819)	Kalākua Kaheiheimālie	Kaʻahumanu (1819–1832)
Liholiho; Kamehameha II (1819–1824)	Kamāmalu	Keouawahine	Pauli Kaʻōleiokū _{*Paternity is in question as daughter and mother both claim Kalaniopuu as the father.}	Kahailiopua; Luahine
Kauikeaouli; Kamehameha III (1825–1854)	Kalama	Elizabeth Kīnaʻu; Kaʻahumanu II	Mataio; Kekūanaōʻa	Pauahi	Laura Kōnia	Abner Pākī
Keaweaweʻulaokalani I	Keaweaweʻulaokalani II
Queen Emma	Alexander Liholiho; Kamehameha IV (1854–1863)	Lot Kapuāiwa; Kamehameha V (1863–1872)	Victoria Kamāmalu; Kaʻahumanu IV (1855–1863)	Ruth Keʻelikōlani	Charles Reed; Bishop	Bernice Pauahi; Bishop
Albert Kamehameha	John William Pitt Kīnaʻu	Keolaokalani Davis

== Ancestry ==
Ancestors of Kalākua Kaheiheimālie

16. Kauakahilau
8. Lonoikahaupu
17. Kuluina
4. Keawepoepoe
18. Kaneikauaiwilani
9. Kalanikauleleiaiwi (= 29)
19. Keakealaniwahine
2. Keʻeaumoku Pāpaʻiahiahi
5. Kūmaʻaikū
1. Kalākua Kaheiheimālie
24. Lonohonuakini
12. Kaulahea II
25. Kalanikauanakinilani
6. Kekaulike
26. ʻUmi-a-Liloa of Maui
13. Papaikaniau
27. Kuʻihewamakawalu
3. NāmāhānaʻiʻKaleleokalani
28. Kauaua-a-Mahi
14. Haʻae-a-Mahi
29. Kalanikauleleiaiwi (= 9)
7. Haʻaloʻu
30. Kaulahea II (= 12)
15. Kalelemauliokalani
31. Papaikaniau (= 13)

Preceded by Ulumāheihei Hoapili	Royal Governor of Maui; 1840–1842	Succeeded by James Young Kānehoa
