= Pākī =

Hawaiian high chief (c. 1808–1855)

Abner Pākī
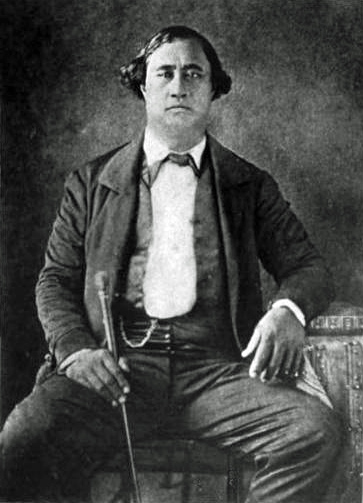
- Born: c. 1808; Molokaʻi
- Died: June 13, 1855; Honolulu, Oʻahu
- Burial: June 28, 1855; Pohukaina Tomb; October 30, 1865; Mauna ʻAla Royal Mausoleum
- Spouse: Kuini Liliha; Kōnia
- Issue: Bernice Pauahi Bishop; Liliʻuokalani (hānai)
Names
- Abner Kuhoʻoheiheipahu Pākī
- Father: Kalani-hele-maiiluna
- Mother: Kuhoʻoheiheipahu

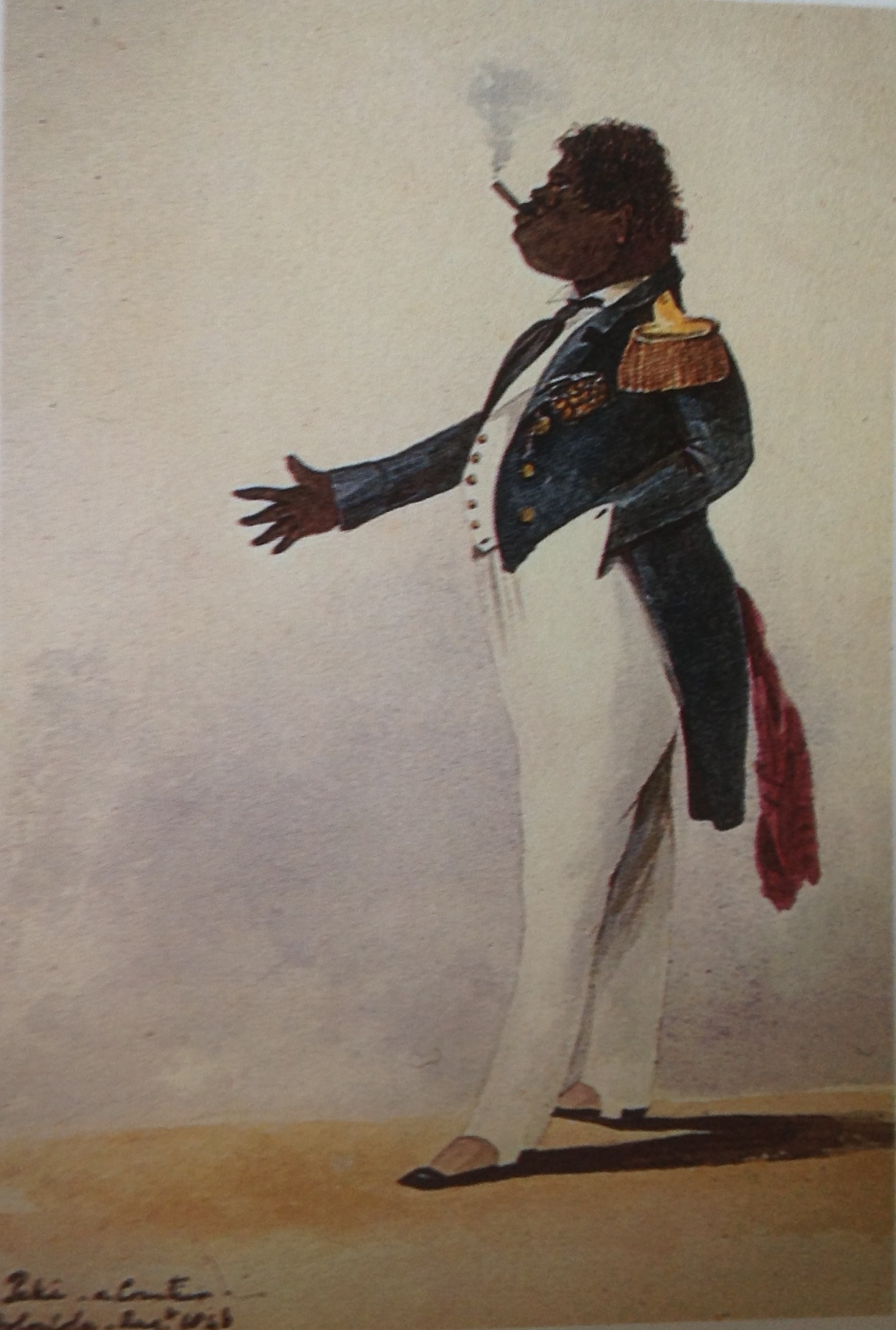
Paki, a courtier, painting by Admiral Sir Henry Byam Martin, 1846

Abner Kuhoʻoheiheipahu Pākī (c. 1808–1855) was a Hawaiian high chief during the reign of King Kamehameha III, the father of Bernice Pauahi Bishop, founder of Kamehameha Schools.

== Early life and family ==
According to Hawaiian tradition, he was born in the year Ualakaa, which corresponded to around 1808, on the island of Molokaʻi. His father was High Chief Kalani-hele-maiiluna, whose father was Kamehamehanui Ailuau the King of Maui, and his mother was Kuhoʻoheiheipahu.

Pākī was a close friend of King Kamehameha III. He served as Privy Councillor, Chamberlain to the King, Assistant Judge of the Supreme Court, and in the House of Nobles from its founding 1841 until 1855. The most prominent feature of his character was his firmness; when he took a stand he was immovable.

Pākī was a noted surfer in his youth. Two of his olo surfboards are preserved in the Bishop Museum. One of these boards measuring 16-foot long was studied by American surfer Tom Blake who made a replica of it in the 1920s.

== Marriages ==
Pākī married first High Chiefess Kuini Liliha but their marriage produced no children. He then married Kamehameha III's niece Laura Kōnia, daughter of Kamehameha III's half-brother Pauli Kaōleiokū. It was one of the first Christian weddings for native Hawaiians at Kawaiahaʻo Church in Honolulu on December 5, 1828.

Konia and Pākī lived at Lahaina when it was the capitol, and the King and the Premier Kekāuluohi, had their residence there. Gorham D. Gilman, a merchant from Boston, mentions visiting Kōnia and Pākī at Lahaina in their "fine new house" in his diary on June 26, 1845.

At this time he also writes:

Called on Paki and Konia, the parents of Bernice and the foster-parents of Lydia, and the first of the nobility that I became acquainted with. They have always been very kind to me, she (Konia) calling me her keiki (child). The Premier has also done so. Konia conferred quite a favor on me by lending me a nice travelling calabash, not wishing to take my trunk, being too heavy.

At this time Lahaina was the capital and the favorite residence of Kamehameha III. It was an important port, filled with whaling ships. Families often accompanied officers to spend winter in the tropics. When the king eventually transferred the seat of government to Honolulu, Pākī and Konia accompanied him. The change was made by the King very reluctantly, for, as Gilman observed, he much preferred the retirement and leisure which he could command at Lahaina.

In his unpublished sketches of the "Chiefs of Honolulu," at the court of Kamehameha III, Gilman has written of Pākī in detail:

A. Paki is one of the conspicuous personages in the (audience) room, being upwards of six feet-six feet four inches-in height, and weighing about three hundred pounds. Although of this colossal size, he is of equal and fine proportions-no one feature being more prominent than another. He generally stands to receive the visitors and exerts himself to be attractive and affable His is of high rank by birth, as well as stature, and, it is said, at one time had more land and tenants than his Majesty himself, which, for some political eruption, were taken from him and the other concerned. And for the same reason, he had never received any appointment of influence other than the hold as one of the superior judges. Be this as it may, he seems to be now in full favor and truly loyal, and is receiving again some of the lands formerly held. He is one of his Majesty's aides and always accompanies him on visits to different parts of his Kingdom. As Chamberlain, he presides over the internal economy of the palace, the expenditure of funds, etc., and one sight of the whole premised shows that every attention has been bestowed (on them.) He speaks English but little, tho' he often attempts it. He is a member in the regular standing of the Mis. Ch, [Kawaiahaʻo] as well as his wife, a chiefess of direct descent from the Kings of Hawaiii, and noted for her kind heartendness and hospitality. Tho' not figuring conspicuously at Court in Honolulu, she is known and regarded as one of those who are patterns. Miss Bernice is their daughter, in whom they feel a justifiable pride.

To this may be added a reminiscence of Mrs. Rice, one of the pioneer teachers of Hawaii. She recalled Pākī as a man of towering height and proportionate strength of which she one witnessed a remarkable exhibition. He had driven down to the beach upon the sailing of a vessel and the horses attached to his carriage became frightened and attempted to run away. Pākī did not try to check them with the reins, but threw himself across the plunging animals and held them by main force, as he might have held a pair of unruly dogs, and so succeeded in quieting them.

== Family ==
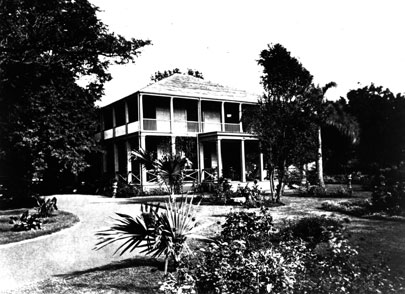
Haleʻākala

With Kōnia he had a daughter, Bernice Pauahi Pākī. She was hānai (adopted) at birth to the Premier Kīnaʻu. Hānai was a tradition of giving up ones child, practiced by the Hawaiian chiefs and commoners alike, to a close relative or friend. It was to strengthen family ties (ohana). The missionaries condemned hānai as immoral and wrong, stating that you should not give up your child like puppies. He and his wife arranged a marriage between her daughter and Kinau's and Kekūanaōʻa's son, Prince Lot.

His daughter opposed her parents' decision. She wished to marry for love and said there was no love between her and Lot besides the love of a brother toward his sister. He, his wife, and Governor Kekūanaōʻa told Bernice it was her duty as a high chiefess to marry a high chief of rank. His daughter later married Charles Reed Bishop, an American. He never attended his daughter's wedding at the Royal School. Bernice and her parents later reconciled at the constant urging of the twelve-year-old Princess Victoria Kamāmalu.

He and Kōnia had a hānai daughter, Lydia Pākī. Their foster daughter was the natural daughter of Keohokalole and Kapaakea. Lydia grew up on Pākī's residence in Honolulu, on King Street. The house was called Haleʻākala, sometimes translated as House of the Sun (Haleakalā), but probably meant Pink House after the coral rock that the house was constructed of. The house was originally called ʻAikupika (Egypt). Later it became the Arlington Hotel.

The two-story coral house was built by Pākī himself, from the original grass hut complex of the same name at the same site, financed by the sale of Mākaha Valley and would later become one of the primary residence of his daughter Bernice Pauahi and her husband.

== Death ==
On the death of Kamehameha III, Pākī predicted he would only outlive his king for a few months. He died on Oahu on June 13, 1855, at Haleʻākala. He had planned on giving all his land and estates to his foster daughter Lydia, but changed his mind and left all his properties to his daughter Bernice. Lydia later became ruling Queen Liliʻuokalani, and would always feel disappointment that her foster sister, Bernice, had not willed her Haleʻākala, where she grew up as a child.

== Family tree ==
Kamehameha family tree

Kalaniʻōpuʻu (k)	Kalola (w)	Keōua (k)	Kekuʻiapoiwa II (w)	Kānekapōlei (w)
Kīwalaʻō	Kekuiapoiwa Liliha
Keōpūolani	Kamehameha I (The Great) (died 1819)	Kalākua Kaheiheimālie	Kaʻahumanu (1819–1832)
Liholiho; Kamehameha II (1819–1824)	Kamāmalu	Keouawahine	Pauli Kaʻōleiokū _{*Paternity is in question as daughter and mother both claim Kalaniopuu as the father.}	Kahailiopua; Luahine
Kauikeaouli; Kamehameha III (1825–1854)	Kalama	Elizabeth Kīnaʻu; Kaʻahumanu II	Mataio; Kekūanaōʻa	Pauahi	Laura Kōnia	Abner Pākī
Keaweaweʻulaokalani I	Keaweaweʻulaokalani II
Queen Emma	Alexander Liholiho; Kamehameha IV (1854–1863)	Lot Kapuāiwa; Kamehameha V (1863–1872)	Victoria Kamāmalu; Kaʻahumanu IV (1855–1863)	Ruth Keʻelikōlani	Charles Reed; Bishop	Bernice Pauahi; Bishop
Albert Kamehameha	John William Pitt Kīnaʻu	Keolaokalani Davis
