= Pauli Kaʻōleiokū =

Hawaiian prince (c. 1767–1818)

Pauli Kaʻōleiokū (c. 1767–1818) was a Prince of Hawaii.

== Early childhood ==
Pauli Kaʻōleiokū was born in about 1767. His mother was High Chiefess Kānekapōlei, a wife of Kalaniʻōpuʻu. His paternity is a matter of some debate. However, it is known that Pauli Kaōleiokū was an ali'i po'olua. Both Kalaniʻōpuʻu and Kamehameha accepted him as their own son. A dispute is not suggested by this from Hawaiian tradition as po'olua was a common and formally acknowledged, chiefly acceptance that enhanced the offspring's lineage. He was admitted into manhood by the traditional ʻawa ceremony around 1778. Shortly after that, he was among the first to meet Captain Cook when he came to the islands. He was known to be an expert spear thrower because of his ability to predict where a moving target would go to.

== Battle of Mokuʻōhai ==
In 1782 Kamehameha I won his first decisive victory towards conquering the islands. King Kalaniʻopuʻu had died a year before leaving his son Kiwalaʻo to rule in his place. Keōua Kūʻahuʻula was left nothing by his father after his death. Enraged by this, Keōua made several provocative moves to insult the new ruler and would become Kamehameha's chief rival during the battle that would ensue. Kamehameha received encouragement and the backing of several prominent figures instead of the new King. Kaʻōleiokū was Keōua's half-brother and supported him in the battle and afterwards, escaped with him to Kaʻū.

Keōua was convinced by twins Kamanawa and Kameʻeiamoku to travel with them when summoned to Kawaihae by Kamehameha. Kaʻōleiokū was among the formal entourage. Keōua was resigned to a probable fate and surrounded himself with his selection of chiefs to die with in his own canoe. Others were ordered to accompany Kaōleiokū. As they came to shore to greet Kamehameha, Keeaumoku Pāpaiahiahi stood from a distance with his men and threw a spear at Keōua, who, after a small fight, was killed.

Kaōleiokū was saved by command of Kamehameha I, who did not intervene during the struggle moments before. Another popular version of this event states that Kamehameha's brother, Keliimaikai had attempted to intercede for Keōua but failed and when Kaōleiokū's group made shore, Keliimaikai demanded that Kamehameha kill the young man and his group stating: "You have killed my Hanai, and I will now kill yours". To which Kamehameha replied: "He shall not die: he is the child of my youth." After that, he was taken into Kamehameha's court and traveled to Oʻahu where he fought problematic Russians around 1816.

== Family and legacy ==
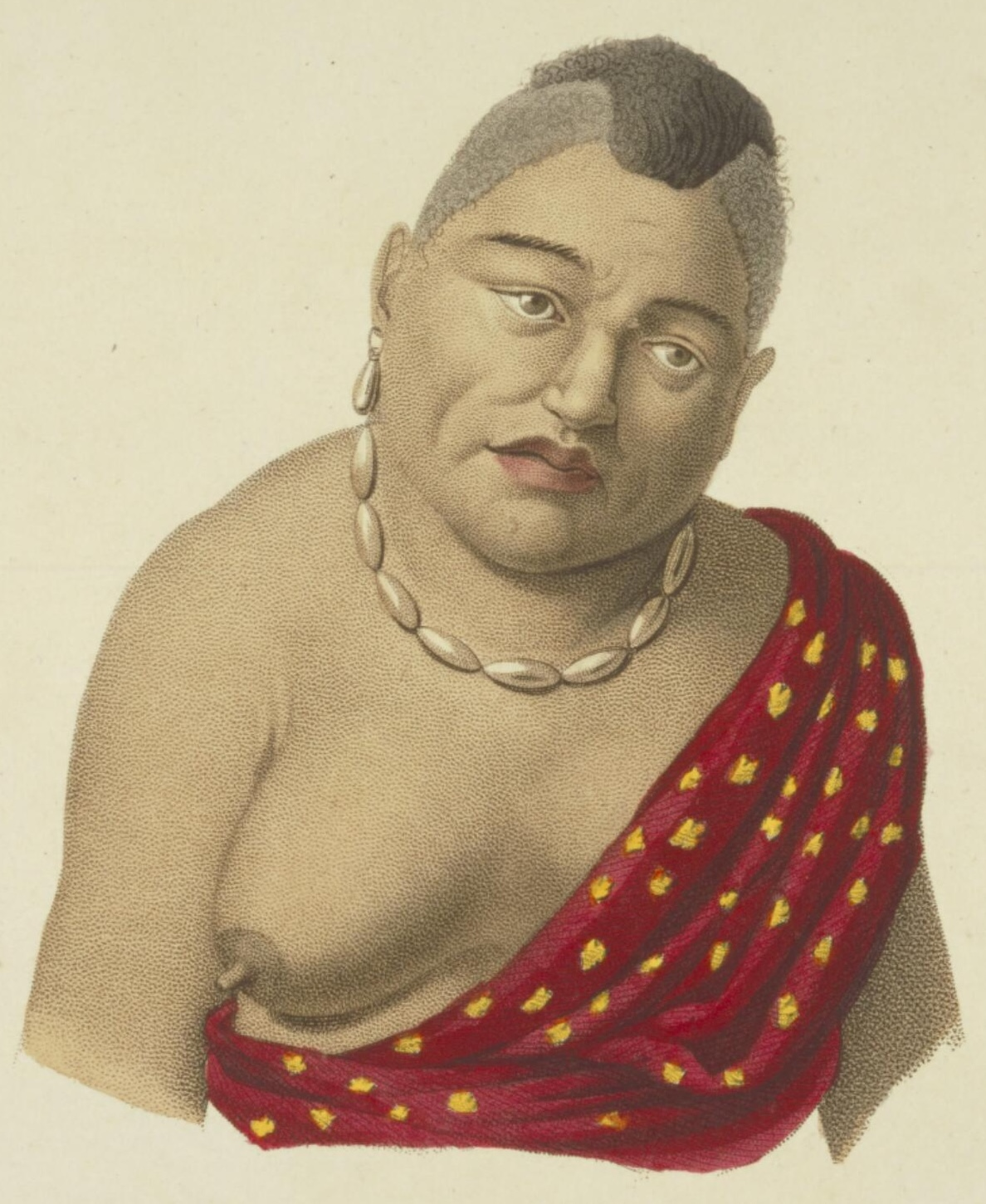
Keōuawahine, one of the wives of Kaʻōleiokū, in 1819

He was the father of four children, Kalanipauahi, Hānuna, Keolaloa and Kōnia. Keōuawahine was the mother of Kalanipauahi and Hānuna, and Kahailiʻōpua Luahine was the mother of Kōnia and Keolaloa.

He died February 19, 1818, supposedly, by means of akua hānai, being secretly fed the scrapings of the wooden images of the poison gods, or the kālaipāhoa gods.

He was a grandfather of Keʻelikōlani and Bernice Pauahi Bishop.

== Family tree ==
Kamehameha family tree

Kalaniʻōpuʻu (k)	Kalola (w)	Keōua (k)	Kekuʻiapoiwa II (w)	Kānekapōlei (w)
Kīwalaʻō	Kekuiapoiwa Liliha
Keōpūolani	Kamehameha I (The Great) (died 1819)	Kalākua Kaheiheimālie	Kaʻahumanu (1819–1832)
Liholiho; Kamehameha II (1819–1824)	Kamāmalu	Keouawahine	Pauli Kaʻōleiokū _{*Paternity is in question as daughter and mother both claim Kalaniopuu as the father.}	Kahailiopua; Luahine
Kauikeaouli; Kamehameha III (1825–1854)	Kalama	Elizabeth Kīnaʻu; Kaʻahumanu II	Mataio; Kekūanaōʻa	Pauahi	Laura Kōnia	Abner Pākī
Keaweaweʻulaokalani I	Keaweaweʻulaokalani II
Queen Emma	Alexander Liholiho; Kamehameha IV (1854–1863)	Lot Kapuāiwa; Kamehameha V (1863–1872)	Victoria Kamāmalu; Kaʻahumanu IV (1855–1863)	Ruth Keʻelikōlani	Charles Reed; Bishop	Bernice Pauahi; Bishop
Albert Kamehameha	John William Pitt Kīnaʻu	Keolaokalani Davis
