= Laura Kōnia =

Hawaiian princess (c. 1808–1857)

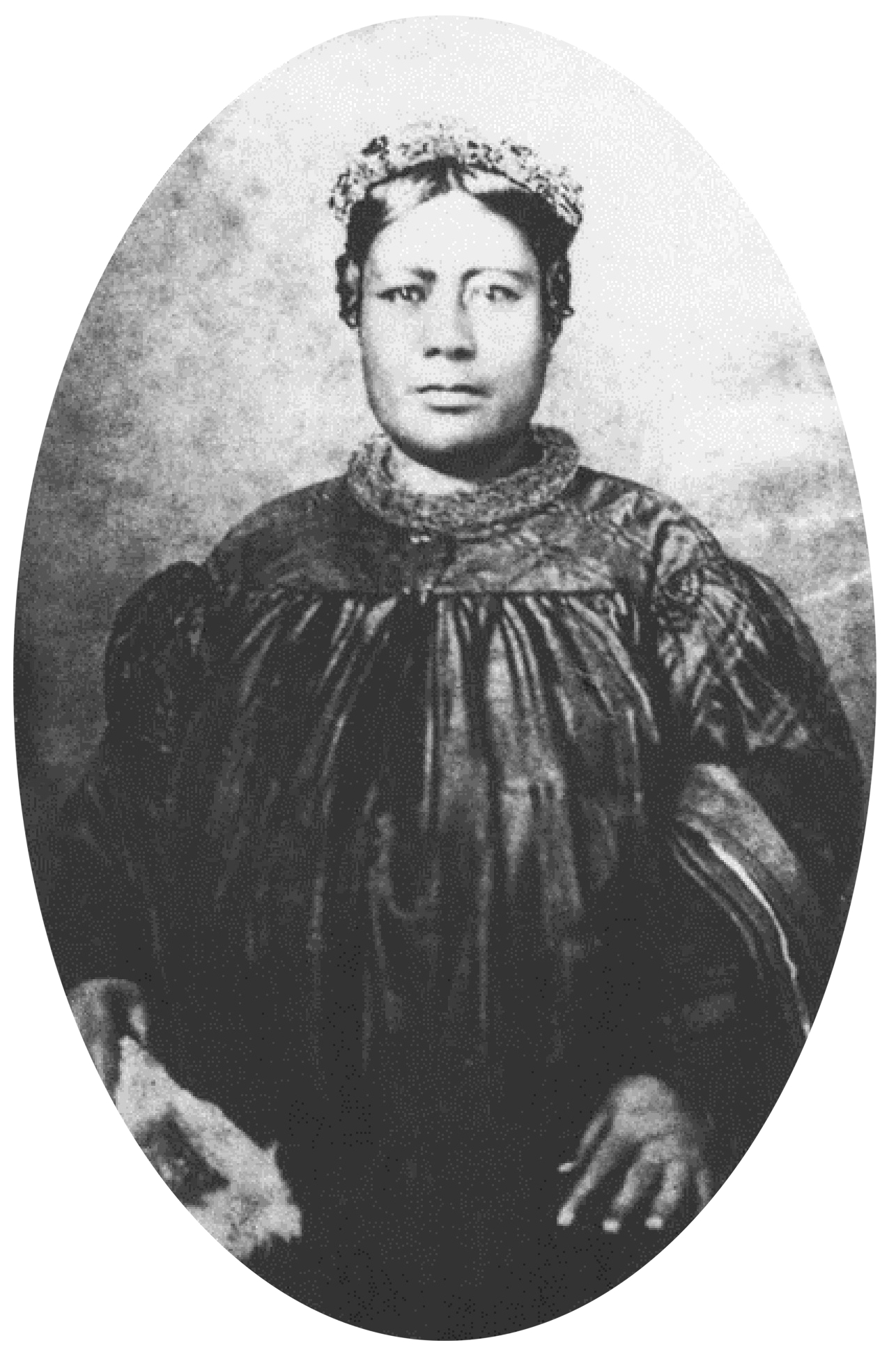
- Born: c. 1808
- Died: July 2, 1857; Honolulu, Oʻahu
- Burial: August 4, 1857; Pohukaina Tomb; October 30, 1865; Mauna ʻAla Royal Mausoleum
- Spouse: Abner Pākī
- Issue: Bernice Pauahi Bishop; Liliʻuokalani (hānai)
- Father: Pauli Kaʻōleiokū
- Mother: Kahailiopua Luahine

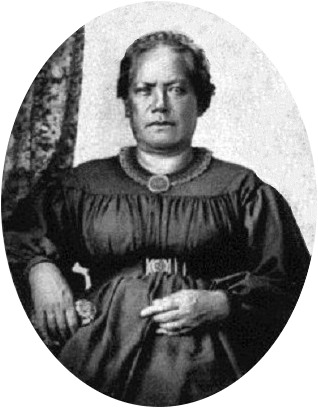
Kōnia in later life, late 1850s

Laura Kanaholo Kōnia (c. 1808–1857) was a high chiefess of the Kingdom of Hawaii. She was the mother of Bernice Pauahi Bishop, the founder of Kamehameha Schools.

== Life ==
She was the youngest daughter of Pauli Kaʻōleiokū by his second wife, High Chiefess Luahine Kahailiopua. Luahine was descended from Keaweikekahialiiokamoku through her mother Kailipakalua.

She married High Chief Abner Kuhoʻoheiheipahu Pākī at Honolulu, Oʻahu. Their marriage was one of the first western Christian ceremonies in the Hawaiian Islands. They married at the recently built Kawaiahaʻo Church on December 5, 1828.

Kōnia and Pākī lived at Lahaina when that was the capital, and the King and the Kuhina Nui, Kekāuluohi had their residence there. The king finally transferred the seat of government to Honolulu, Pākī and Konia accompanying him. By 1840, King Kamehameha III had a written Hawaiian Constitution and established a legislature. She and her husband were both among members of the House of Nobles from 1840 to 1851.

On December 19, 1831, in Honolulu, Kōnia and Pākī had a daughter, named Bernice Pauahi Pākī after Kōnia's half sister, Kalanipauahi, who was saved as an infant from a fire. She let her daughter be adopted (the Hawaiian hānai tradition) to Kuhina-nui Kaʻahumanu II, Elizabeth Kīnaʻu.

Kōnia betrothed her daughter to Kīnaʻu's son Prince Lot Kapuāiwa in the Hawaiian practice of hoʻopalau. Bernice had no affection for Prince Lot. Bernice fell in love with Charles Reed Bishop and married him in 1850, when Bernice was 18 years old. She and her husband Pākī strongly opposed this union. The wedding had to be held by the Cookes at Chiefs' Children's School. She and Pākī did not attend the wedding, hoping that the Bernice would change her mind and marry Prince Lot. She and her husband later accepted their new son-in-law and are reconciled with Bernice on the advice of Princess Victoria Kamāmalu on August 2, 1851.

Boston merchant Gorham D. Gilman says of Kōnia:

She was one of nature's true noblewomen, such as were to be found in that then unenlightended country. She possessed the elements of a strong character and was a recognized force, not only in administration of her own affairs, but when the King, Kamehameha III., formed his first body of high chiefs into a council of the government, she, with a few other of like birth, were selected as his advisers. She was naturally of gentle manners, and physically was rather short of stature, though inclined to stoutness. The daughter, Bernice, inherited her mother's grace of manner, and those qualities whereby all recognized her inheritance of birth and blood. Pākī was a fitting companion for Kōnia.

Kōnia was a poet and singer in the ancient Hawaiian tradition. In accordance with Hawaiian hānai tradition, she adopted Lydia Kamakaeha, the daughter of Caeser Kapaʻakea and Analea Keohokālole, soon to be the last monarch, Liliʻuokalani. Kōnia was the main influence of her daughter's success as a musician during her early years. Before Lydia's schooling at Chiefs' Children's School, Kōnia had Lydia brought to her daily.

Her foster daughter Liliʻuokalani said, "I knew no other father or mother than my foster-parents, no other sister than Bernice." Kōnia died during the influenza epidemic of Hawaii on July 2, 1857. The death of Pākī and Kōnia placed Liliʻuokalani under the charge of Bishop and Bernice. Kōnia's funeral was held on August 4, 1857 in Haleākala; it had been postponed for weeks due to the illnesses of the guests. Initially buried in the Pohukaina Tomb located on grounds of ʻIolani Palace, her remains were later transported along with those of her husband and other royals in a midnight torchlight procession on October 30, 1865, to the newly constructed Royal Mausoleum at Mauna ʻAla in the Nuʻuanu Valley. In 1887, after the Mausoleum building became too crowded, the coffins belonging to members of the Kamehameha Dynasty including Kōnia's were moved to the newly built Kamehameha Tomb. The name "Konia" was inscribed on the waikiki side of the monument above her final resting place.

== Family tree ==
Kamehameha family tree

Kalaniʻōpuʻu (k)	Kalola (w)	Keōua (k)	Kekuʻiapoiwa II (w)	Kānekapōlei (w)
Kīwalaʻō	Kekuiapoiwa Liliha
Keōpūolani	Kamehameha I (The Great) (died 1819)	Kalākua Kaheiheimālie	Kaʻahumanu (1819–1832)
Liholiho; Kamehameha II (1819–1824)	Kamāmalu	Keouawahine	Pauli Kaʻōleiokū _{*Paternity is in question as daughter and mother both claim Kalaniopuu as the father.}	Kahailiopua; Luahine
Kauikeaouli; Kamehameha III (1825–1854)	Kalama	Elizabeth Kīnaʻu; Kaʻahumanu II	Mataio; Kekūanaōʻa	Pauahi	Laura Kōnia	Abner Pākī
Keaweaweʻulaokalani I	Keaweaweʻulaokalani II
Queen Emma	Alexander Liholiho; Kamehameha IV (1854–1863)	Lot Kapuāiwa; Kamehameha V (1863–1872)	Victoria Kamāmalu; Kaʻahumanu IV (1855–1863)	Ruth Keʻelikōlani	Charles Reed; Bishop	Bernice Pauahi; Bishop
Albert Kamehameha	John William Pitt Kīnaʻu	Keolaokalani Davis

== Bibliography ==
- Alexander, William DeWitt (1894). "The "Hale o Keawe" at Honaunau, Hawaii". Journal of the Polynesian Society. 3. London: E. A. Petherick: 159–161.
- Judd, Walter F. (1975). Palaces and Forts of the Hawaiian Kingdom: From Thatch to American Florentine. Palo Alto, CA: Pacific Books. ISBN 0870152165.
- Parker, David "Kawika" (2008). "Crypts of the Ali`i The Last Refuge of the Hawaiian Royalty". Tales of Our Hawaiʻi (PDF). Honolulu: Alu Like, Inc. OCLC 309392477. Archived from the original (PDF) on November 11, 2013.
