= Kekūʻiapoiwa II =

Hawaiian chiefess

- Spouse: Keōua; Kamanawa
- Issue: Kamehameha I Keliʻimaikaʻi; Piʻipiʻi Kalanikaulihiwakama
- Father: Haʻae-a-Mahi
- Mother: Kekelakekeokalani

Kekūʻiapoiwa II was a Hawaiian chiefess and the mother of the king Kamehameha I.

== Biography ==
Kekūʻiapoiwa was named after her aunt Kekūʻiapoiwa Nui (also known as Kekūʻiapoiwa I), the wife of King Kekaulike of Maui.

Her father was High Chief Haʻae, the son of Chiefess Kalanikauleleiaiwi and High Chief Kauaua-a-Mahi of the Mahi family of the Kohala district of Hawaiʻi island, and brother of Alapainui. Her mother was Princess Kekelakekeokalani-a-Keawe (also known as Kekelaokalani), daughter of the same Kalanikauleleiaiwi and Keaweʻīkekahialiʻiokamoku, king of Hawaii. Her mother had been sought after by many who wished to marry into the Keawe line. She was the niece of Alapainui through both her father and mother.

She married the High Chief Keōua to whom she had been betrothed since childhood. Through her double grandmother Kalanikauleleiaiwi, Keōua's own paternal grandmother, she was the double cousin of Keōua. When her uncle was staying at Kohala superintending the collection of his fleet and warriors from the different districts of the island preparatory to the invasion of Maui, in the month of Ikuwa (probably winter) Kamehameha was born probably in November 1758. He had his birth ceremony at the Moʻokini Heiau, an ancient temple which is preserved in Kohala Historical Sites State Monument.

Many stories are told about the birth of Kamehameha.

One says that when Kekuʻiapoiwa was pregnant with Kamehameha, she had a craving for the eyeball of a chief. She was given the eyeball of a man-eating shark and the priests prophesied that this meant the child would be a rebel and a killer of chiefs. Alapainui, the old ruler of the island of Hawaiʻi, secretly made plans to have the newborn infant killed.

Kekuʻiapoiwa's time came on a stormy night in the Kohala district, when a strange star with a tail of white fire appeared in the western sky. This could have been Halley's Comet which appeared near the end of 1758. According to one legend, the baby was passed through a hole in the side of Kekuiapoiwa's thatched hut to a local Kohala chief named Naeʻole, who carried the child to safety at Awini on the island's north coast. By the time the infant in Naeʻole's care was five, Alapainui had accepted him back into his household.

After Kamehameha, Kekuʻiapoiwa bore a second son, Keliimaikai. A few years later, Keōua died in Hilo, and the family moved with Alapainui to an area near Kawaihae, where she married a chief of the Kona district (and her uncle) Kamanawa. She had one daughter, Piʻipiʻi Kalanikaulihiwakama, from this second husband, who would later become an important military ally of Kamehameha, who was both step son and cousin through several relationships. Piʻipiʻi became first the wife of Keholoikalani, the father of her son Kanihonui, and later she married Kaikioʻewa, who she had a daughter Kuwahine with. Kanihonui was killed by his uncle Kamehameha I in 1809 for sleeping with Queen Kaʻahumanu.

== Kamehameha dynasty ==
Kamehameha family tree

Kalaniʻōpuʻu (k) | Kalola (w) | Keōua (k) | Kekuʻiapoiwa II (w) | Kānekapōlei (w)
Kīwalaʻō | Kekuiapoiwa Liliha
Keōpūolani | Kamehameha I (The Great) (died 1819) | Kalākua Kaheiheimālie | Kaʻahumanu (1819–1832)
Liholiho; Kamehameha II (1819–1824) | Kamāmalu | Keouawahine | Pauli Kaʻōleiokū _{*Paternity is in question as daughter and mother both claim Kalaniopuu as the father.} | Kahailiopua; Luahine
Kauikeaouli; Kamehameha III (1825–1854) | Kalama | Elizabeth Kīnaʻu; Kaʻahumanu II | Mataio; Kekūanaōʻa | Pauahi | Laura Kōnia | Abner Pākī
Keaweaweʻulaokalani I | Keaweaweʻulaokalani II
Queen Emma | Alexander Liholiho; Kamehameha IV (1854–1863) | Lot Kapuāiwa; Kamehameha V (1863–1872) | Victoria Kamāmalu; Kaʻahumanu IV (1855–1863) | Ruth Keʻelikōlani | Charles Reed; Bishop | Bernice Pauahi; Bishop
Albert Kamehameha | John William Pitt Kīnaʻu | Keolaokalani Davis
