= Keaweaweʻulaokalani =

Hawaiian princes

Keaweaweʻulaokalani is a name shared by two short-lived princes and heirs to the throne of the Kingdom of Hawaii. Both were named after their father Kamehameha III. In Hawaiian, the name means "the red trail of heaven", signifying the roadway by which the god descends from heaven.

== Earlier ==
Keaweaweʻulaokalani I
- Prince of Hawaii
- Born: 1839
- Died: 1839
- House: House of Kamehameha
- Father: Kamehameha III
- Mother: Kalama

Keaweaweʻulaokalani I (1839–1839) was the eldest son of Kamehameha III and his queen consort Kalama Hakaleleponi-i-Kapakuhaili. The baby boy was named after his father, whose full name was "Keaweaweʻula Kiwalaʻo Kauikeaouli Kaleiopapa Kalani Waiakua Kalanikau Iokikilo Kiwalaʻo i ke kapu Kamehameha".

The young Prince Keawe died shortly after his birth. His death left Kamehameha III again childless. His younger brother, Keaweaweʻulaokalani II, would not be born until 1842.

== Later ==
Keaweaweʻulaokalani II
- Prince of Hawaii
- Born: January 14, 1842
- Died: February 1842
- House: House of Kamehameha
- Father: Kamehameha III
- Mother: Kalama

Keaweaweʻulaokalani II (1842–1842) was the second son of Kamehameha III and his queen consort Kalama Hakaleleponi-i-Kapakuhaili. The baby boy was the namesake of his father and his brother.

Initially given in hānai to Kalākua Kaheiheimālie, he was instead adopted or hānai by his grand aunt, Kekāuluohi and her husband Kanaʻina when the old governess of Maui died not three days after his birth. The King promised that he would be sent to the Chiefs' Children's School once he was weaned and could walk. He soon developed a fever and died at 31 days old. Dr. Baldwin of Lahaina was convinced that the child was killed by traditional medicinal treatment.

== Family tree ==
Kamehameha family tree

Kalaniʻōpuʻu (k)	Kalola (w)	Keōua (k)	Kekuʻiapoiwa II (w)	Kānekapōlei (w)
Kīwalaʻō	Kekuiapoiwa Liliha
Keōpūolani	Kamehameha I (The Great) (died 1819)	Kalākua Kaheiheimālie	Kaʻahumanu (1819–1832)
Liholiho; Kamehameha II (1819–1824)	Kamāmalu	Keouawahine	Pauli Kaʻōleiokū _{*Paternity is in question as daughter and mother both claim Kalaniopuu as the father.}	Kahailiopua; Luahine
Kauikeaouli; Kamehameha III (1825–1854)	Kalama	Elizabeth Kīnaʻu; Kaʻahumanu II	Mataio; Kekūanaōʻa	Pauahi	Laura Kōnia	Abner Pākī
Keaweaweʻulaokalani I	Keaweaweʻulaokalani II
Queen Emma	Alexander Liholiho; Kamehameha IV (1854–1863)	Lot Kapuāiwa; Kamehameha V (1863–1872)	Victoria Kamāmalu; Kaʻahumanu IV (1855–1863)	Ruth Keʻelikōlani	Charles Reed; Bishop	Bernice Pauahi; Bishop
Albert Kamehameha	John William Pitt Kīnaʻu	Keolaokalani Davis
