= Kamāmalu =

Queen consort of Hawaii from 1819 to 1824

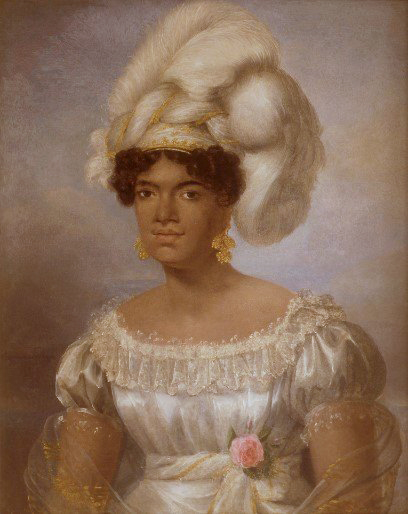
- Portrait of Kamāmalu at ʻIolani Palace

Queen consort of the Hawaiian Islands
- Tenure: May 20, 1819 – July 8, 1824
- Born: c. 1802; Kawaihae, Hawaii
- Died: July 8, 1824 (aged 21–22); London, England
- Burial: May 11, 1825; Mauna ʻAla Royal Mausoleum
- Spouse: Kamehameha II
Names
- Kamāmalu Kalani-Kuaʻana-o-Kamehamalu-Kekūāiwa-o-kalani-Kealiʻi-Hoʻopili-a-Walu
- House: House of Kamehameha
- Father: Kamehameha I
- Mother: Queen Kalākua Kaheiheimālie

Kamāmalu Kalani-Kuaʻana-o-Kamehamalu-Kekūāiwa-o-kalani-Kealiʻi-Hoʻopili-a-Walu (c. 1802–1824) was Queen consort of the Kingdom of Hawaiʻi as the wife of King Kamehameha II. Kamāmalu was short for Kamehamalu or Kamehamehamalu meaning "the Shade of the Lonely One", honoring her father, "the Lonely One". She is not to be confused with her niece, Princess Victoria Kamāmalu.

== Life ==
She was the eldest daughter of Queen Kalākua Kaheiheimālie and King Kamehameha I. She was referred to as Kekūāiwa for the early part of her life. According to John Papa ʻĪʻī, she was betrothed to her half-brother Kamehameha II from birth and they were married when she was twelve and he was seventeen or eighteen. Her younger sister Kīnaʻu later also became wife of Kamehameha II as did their half-sister Kekauluohi by their mothers Kalakua Kaheiheimalie. Even though her husband had four other wives (two of them her sisters and the two others her nieces), Kamāmalu was her husband's favorite wife.

In 1823, she joined a royal procession honoring her husband's accession to the throne in a car modeled as a whaleboat. It was fastened to a platform 30 feet (9.1 m) long by 12 feet (3.7 m) wide and borne by 70 men. The boat was lined and the whole platform covered with fine imported broadcloth and tapa cloth of rich colors. The only dress of the queen was a scarlet silk paʻū, and a coronet of feathers. She was seated in the middle of the boat, and screened from the sun by an immense Chinese umbrella of scarlet damask, ornamented with gilding and tassels, supported by a chief standing behind her in a scarlet loincloth and feather helmet. On the boat stood Prime Minister Kalanimoku and national orator Naihe in feathered helmets and bearing a kahili or feather staff of state.

Queen Kamāmalu had a tattoo applied to her tongue as an expression of her deep grief when her mother-in-law Queen Keōpūolani died in 1823. Missionary William Ellis watched the procedure, commenting to the queen that she must be undergoing great pain. The queen replied, "He eha nui no, he nui roa ra ku‘u aroha." (Great pain indeed, greater is my affection.)

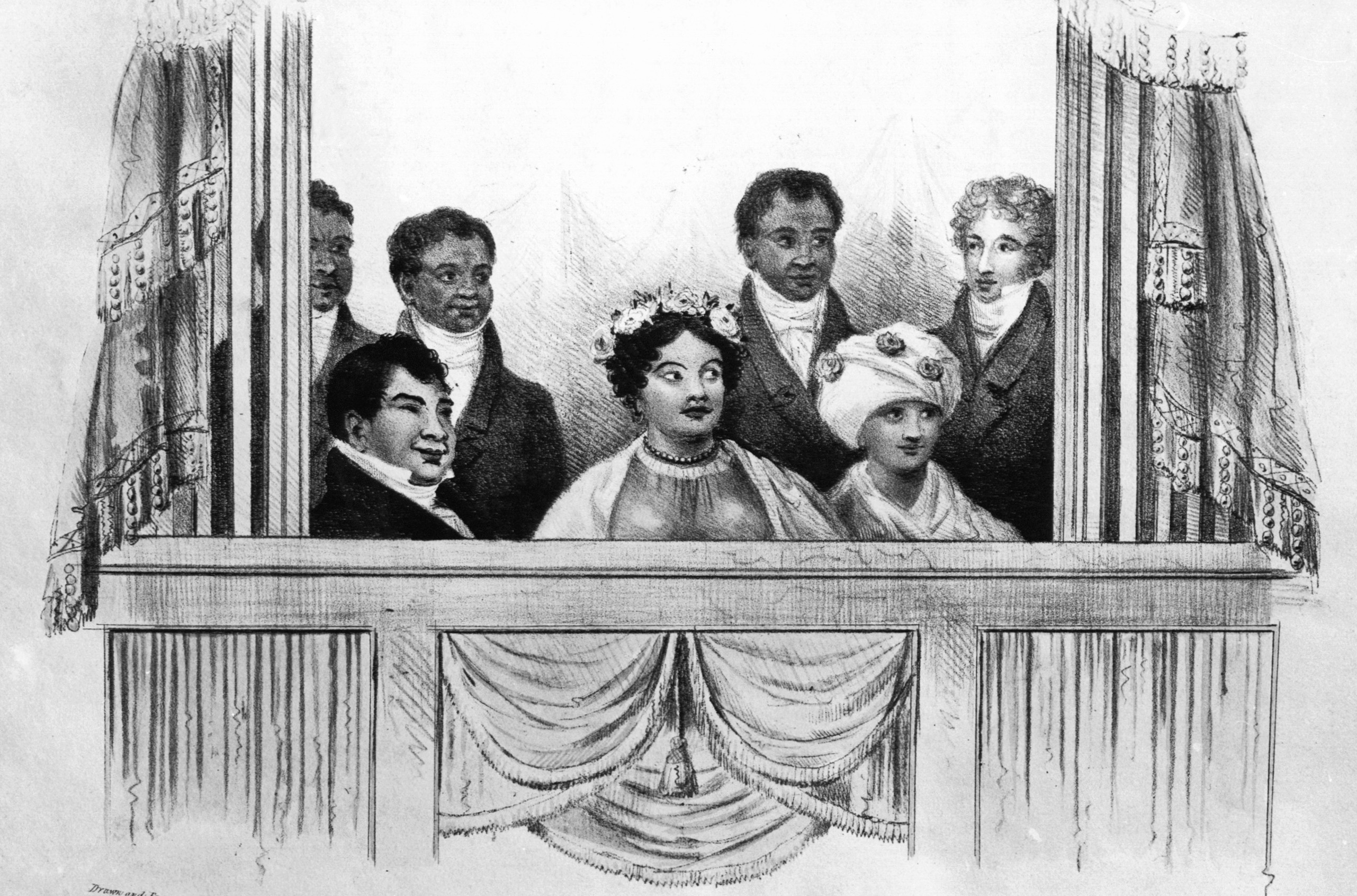
In the royal box at London, 1824

In 1823, Kamehameha II and Kamāmalu left the Sandwich Islands for London, arriving there in May 1824 for a state visit with King George IV. In London the royal party were fitted with the latest fashion and attended opera and ballet at the Theatre Royal in Drury Lane. Many ladies of London sought the patterns of the turban that adorned her head. She attracted attention because she stood over six feet tall and was strikingly beautiful. She and her husband were the first Hawaiian monarchs to visit England. While in London, Kamāmalu contracted measles and died on July 8. Six days later her grief-stricken husband also died of the measles. Their bodies were placed in coffins and taken back to Hawaii on HMS Blonde. At first they were buried in a coral house on the grounds of the ʻIolani Palace, but were later moved to the Royal Mausoleum in Nuʻuanu Valley of Oʻahu island.

== Family tree ==
Kamehameha family tree

Kalaniʻōpuʻu (k)	Kalola (w)	Keōua (k)	Kekuʻiapoiwa II (w)	Kānekapōlei (w)
Kīwalaʻō	Kekuiapoiwa Liliha
Keōpūolani	Kamehameha I (The Great) (died 1819)	Kalākua Kaheiheimālie	Kaʻahumanu (1819–1832)
Liholiho; Kamehameha II (1819–1824)	Kamāmalu	Keouawahine	Pauli Kaʻōleiokū _{*Paternity is in question as daughter and mother both claim Kalaniopuu as the father.}	Kahailiopua; Luahine
Kauikeaouli; Kamehameha III (1825–1854)	Kalama	Elizabeth Kīnaʻu; Kaʻahumanu II	Mataio; Kekūanaōʻa	Pauahi	Laura Kōnia	Abner Pākī
Keaweaweʻulaokalani I	Keaweaweʻulaokalani II
Queen Emma	Alexander Liholiho; Kamehameha IV (1854–1863)	Lot Kapuāiwa; Kamehameha V (1863–1872)	Victoria Kamāmalu; Kaʻahumanu IV (1855–1863)	Ruth Keʻelikōlani	Charles Reed; Bishop	Bernice Pauahi; Bishop
Albert Kamehameha	John William Pitt Kīnaʻu	Keolaokalani Davis

== Bibliography ==
- Corley, J. Susan (2012). "Queen Kamämalu's Place in Hawaiian History". Hawaiian Journal of History. 46. Hawaiian Historical Society: 37–60. hdl:10524/33793.

Royal titles
Preceded by Keōpūolani and Kaʻahumanu	Queen consort of Hawaiʻi; 1819 – 1824	Succeeded by Kalama
