= Kamehameha III =

King of the Hawaiian Islands from 1825 to 1854

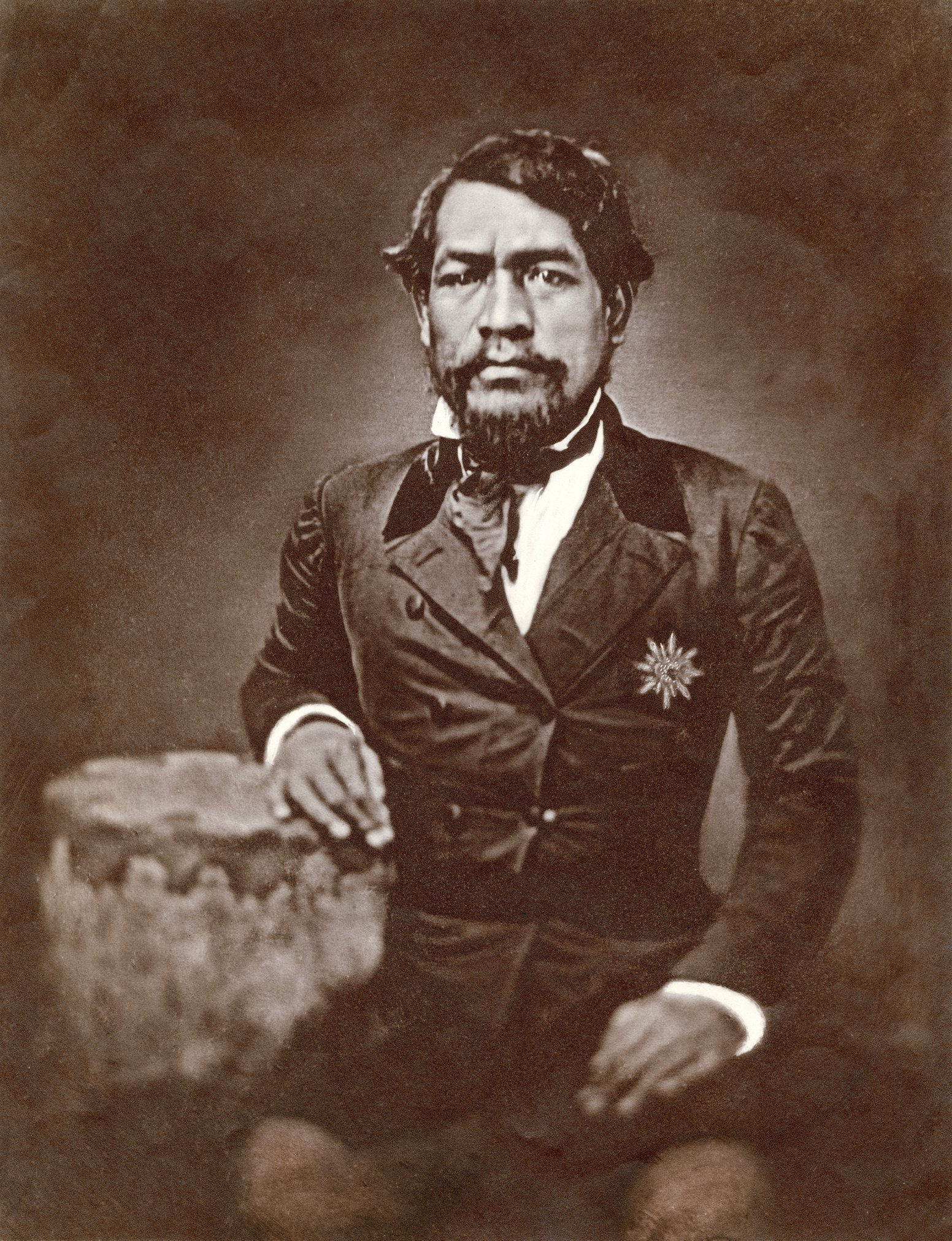
- Photograph of Kamehameha III, c. 1853.

King of the Hawaiian Islands
- Reign: June 6, 1825 – December 15, 1854
- Predecessor: Kamehameha II
- Successor: Kamehameha IV
- Kuhina Nui: Kaʻahumanu I Kaʻahumanu II; Kaʻahumanu III; Keoni Ana
- Born: Kauikeaouli; March 17, 1814; Keauhou Bay at North Kona, Hawaiʻi island
- Died: December 15, 1854 (aged 40); Hoihoikeʻea, Honolulu, Oʻahu
- Burial: January 10, 1855; Mauna ʻAla Royal Mausoleum
- Spouse: Kalama
- Issue: Keaweaweʻulaokalani I Keaweaweʻulaokalani II; Kīwalaʻō (illegitimate); Albert Kūnuiākea (illegitimate); Kamehameha IV (hānai); Kaʻiminaʻauao (hānai)
Names
- Keaweaweʻula Kīwalaʻō Kauikeaouli Kaleiopapa Kalani Waiakua Kalanikau Iokikilo Kīwalaʻō i ke kapu Kamehameha
- House: Kamehameha
- Father: Kamehameha I
- Mother: Keōpūolani

Kamehameha III (born Kauikeaouli; March 17, 1814 – December 15, 1854) was the third king of the Kingdom of Hawaii from 1825 until his death in 1854. His full Hawaiian name was Keaweaweʻula Kīwalaʻō Kauikeaouli Kaleiopapa and then lengthened to Keaweaweʻula Kīwalaʻō Kauikeaouli Kaleiopapa Kalani Waiakua Kalanikau Iokikilo Kīwalaʻō i ke kapu Kamehameha when he ascended the throne.

Under his reign, Hawaii evolved from an absolute monarchy to a constitutional monarchy with the signing of both the 1840 Constitution, which was the first Hawaiian Language Constitution, and the 1852 Constitution. He was the longest reigning monarch in the history of the Kingdom, ruling for 29 years and 192 days, although in the early part of his reign he was under a regency by Queen Kaʻahumanu and later by Kaʻahumanu II. His goal was the careful balancing of modernization by adopting Western ways while keeping his nation intact.

== Early life ==
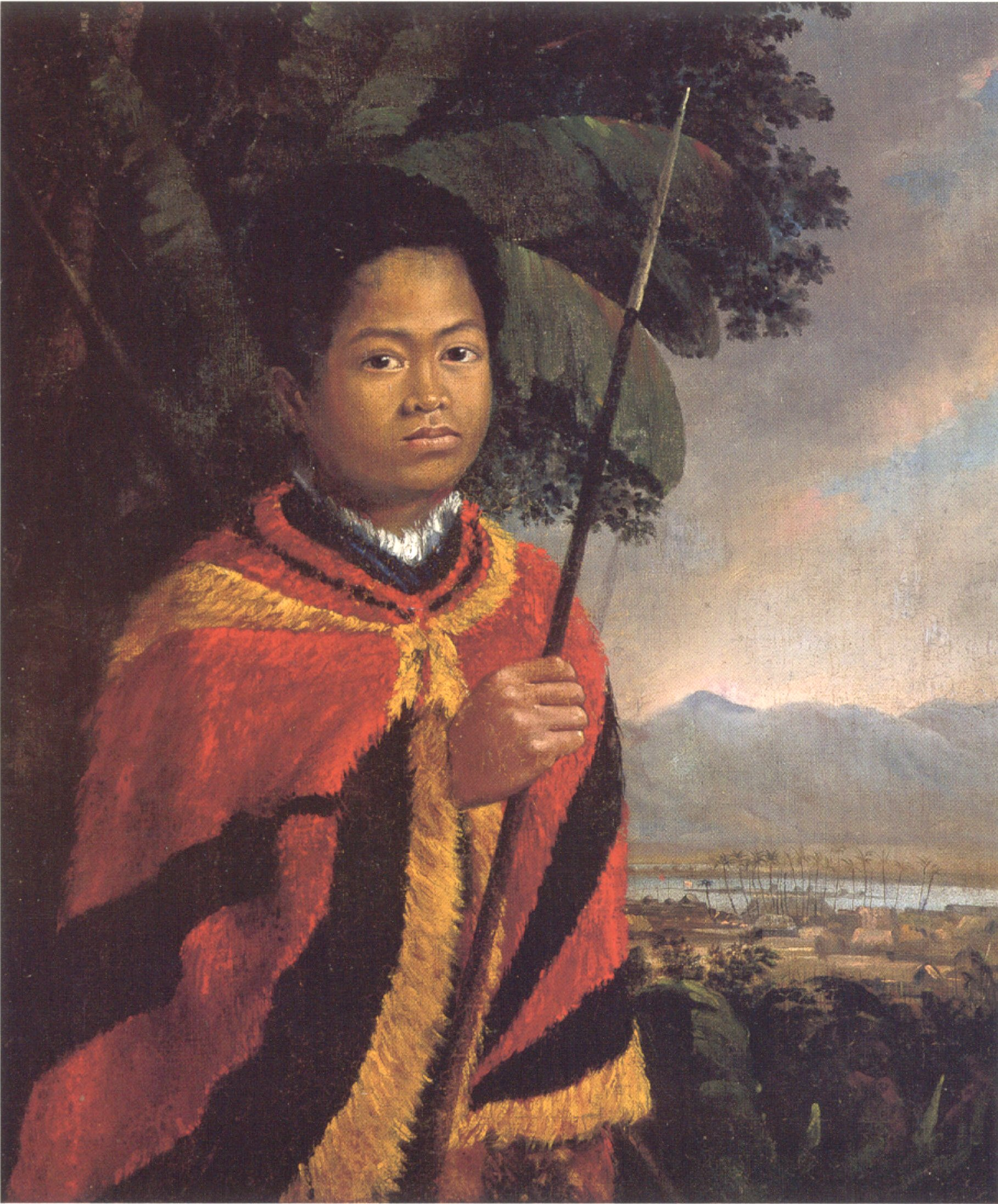
Painting by Robert Dampier, 1825, Honolulu Museum of Art

Kauikeaouli was born at Keauhou Bay, on Hawaiʻi island, the largest island of the Hawaiian Islands archipelago. He was the second son of King Kamehameha I and his highest ranking wife, Queen Keōpūolani, born in Maui. Early historians suggested June or July 1814, but one accepted date is August 11, 1813. Biographer P. Christiaan Klieger cites 17 March 1814 as his birthday, which is the date declared by the Privy Council as the official birthday in its meeting of March 16, 1846. He was of the highest kapu lineage. Kauikeaouli was about 16 years younger than his brother Liholiho, who ruled as Kamehameha II starting in 1819. He was named Kauikeaouli (placed in the dark clouds) Kaleiopapa Kuakamanolani Mahinalani Kalaninuiwaiakua Keaweaweʻulaokalani (the red trail or the roadway by which the god descends from heaven) after his maternal grandfather Kīwalaʻō. He was promised to Kuakini in adoption, but as at birth he appeared to be delivered stillborn, Kuakini did not wish to take him. But Chief Kaikioʻewa summoned his kaula (prophet) Kapihe who declared the baby would live. Kauikeaouli was cleansed, laid on a rock, fanned, prayed over and sprinkled with water until he breathed, moved and cried. The prayer of Kapihe was to Kaʻōnohiokalā, "Child of God". The rock is preserved as a monument at Keauhou Bay. He was given to Kaikioʻewa to raise.

He was torn between the Puritan Christian guidelines imposed on the kingdom by the kuhina nui (Queen Regent) who was his stepmother Kaʻahumanu, and the desires to honor the old traditions. Under the influence of Oʻahu's then governor, Boki, and a young Hawaiian-Tahitian former priest named Kaomi, Kauikeaouli's aikāne partner, he rebelled against his partial Christian upbringing.

== Reign ==
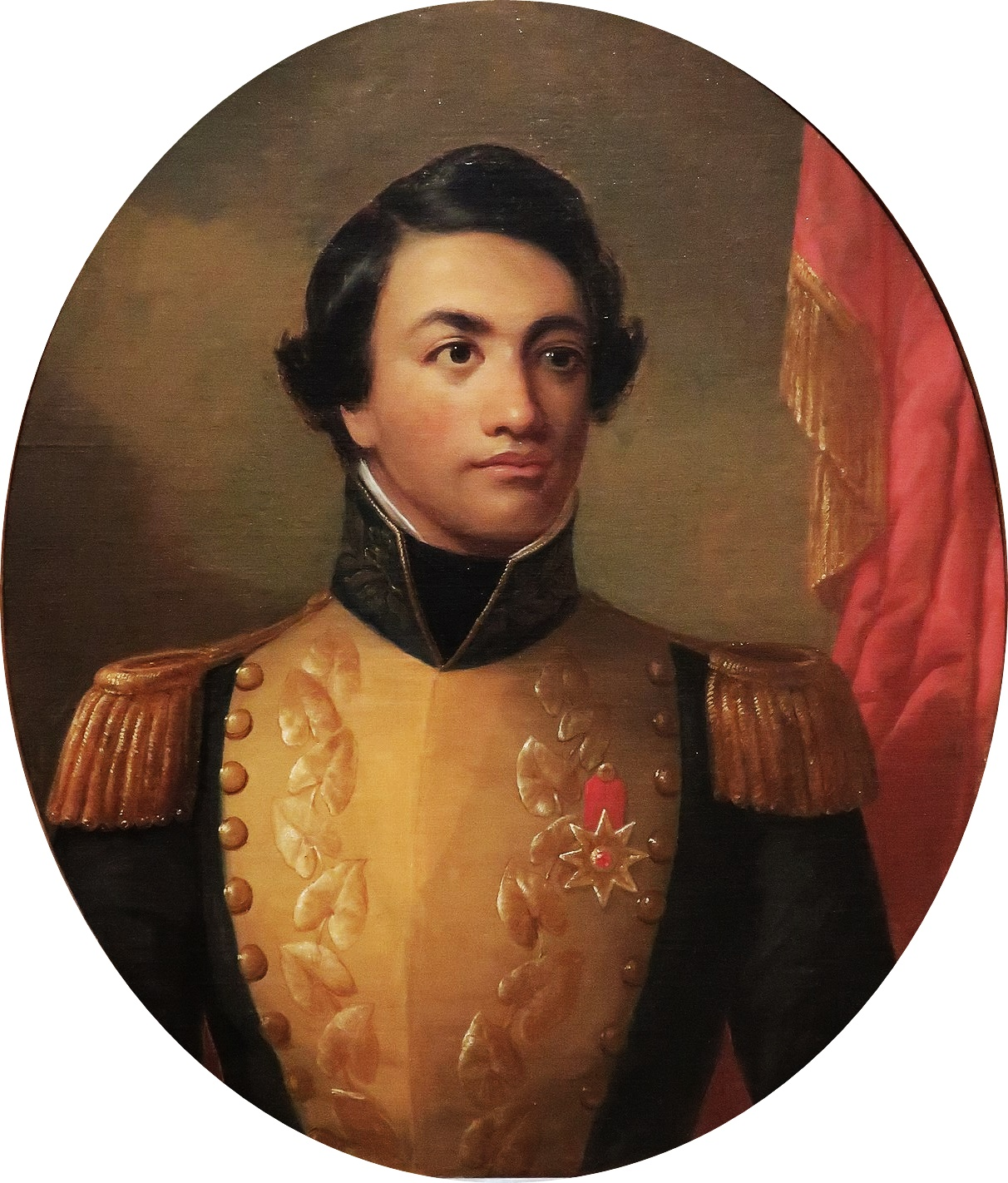
Kamehameha III at the age of 18

When Kauikeaouli came to the throne in 1825, the native population numbered about 150,000, which was already less than one-third of the Hawaiian population at the time of Captain Cook's arrival to Hawaii in 1778. During his reign, that number would be halved again, due to a series of epidemics.

=== Marriage and children ===
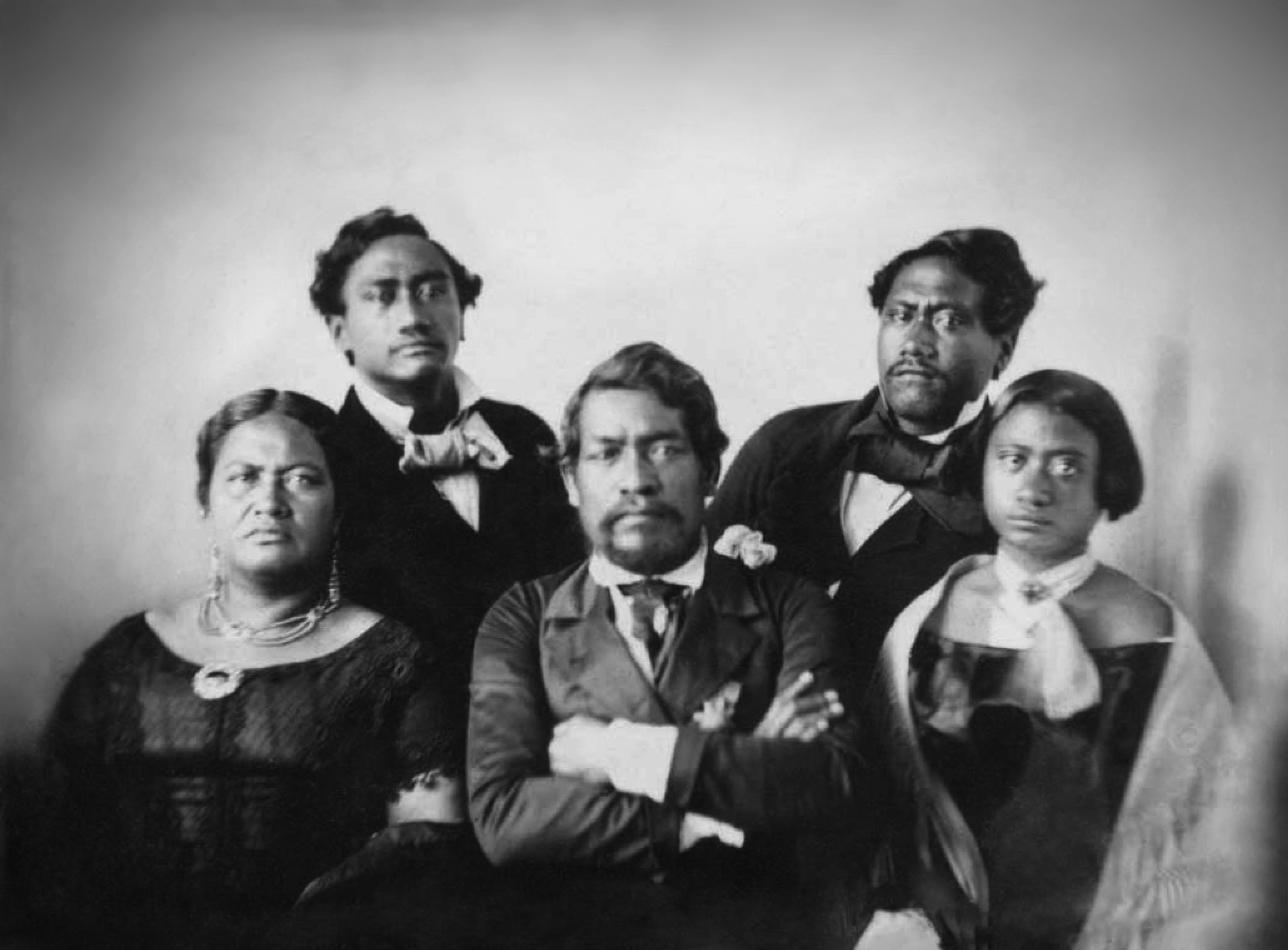
Kamehameha III and Queen Kalama with his niece and nephews

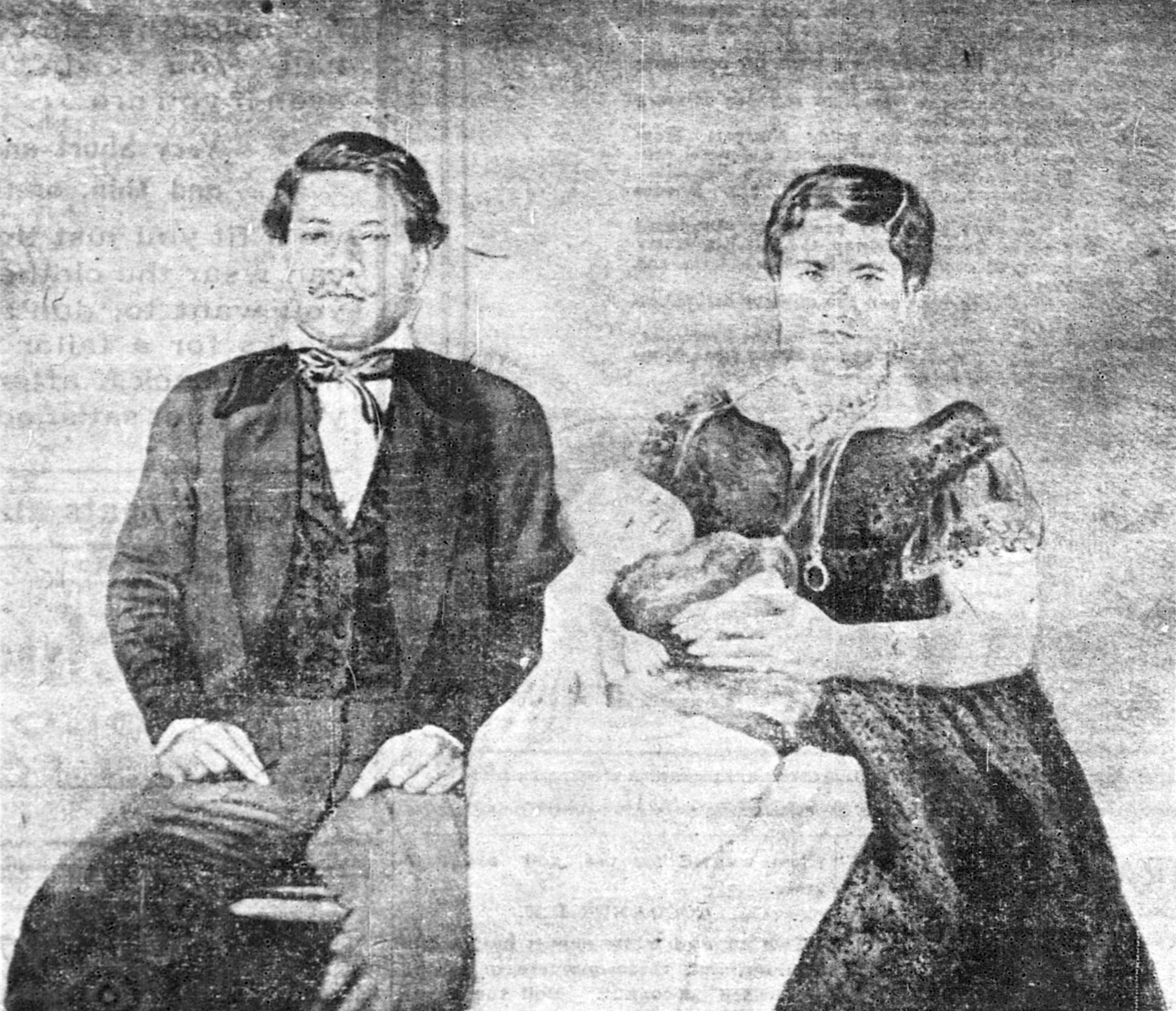
Kamehameha III and Queen Kalama with Albert Kūnuiākea

In ancient Hawaii, the upper classes considered a marriage with a close royal family member to be an excellent way to preserve pure bloodlines. His brother Liholiho (King Kamehameha II) and his Queen Kamāmalu were a half-sister and brother couple. He had loved his sister Nāhiʻenaʻena and planned to marry her since childhood, but the union was opposed by the missionaries due to their perceptions of incest.

It was proposed in 1832 that Kamanele, the daughter of Governor John Adams Kuakini, would be the most suitable in age, rank, and education for his queen. Kamanele died in 1834 before the wedding took place. Instead Kamehameha III chose to marry Kalama Hakaleleponi Kapakuhaili, against the wishes of Kīnaʻu. Kalama's father was Naihekukui. After his sister's death in late 1836, he married Kalama on February 14, 1837, in a Christian ceremony. Kamehameha III and Kalama had two children: Prince Keaweaweʻulaokalani I and Prince Keaweaweʻulaokalani II who both died while infants. He and his mistress Jane Lahilahi, a daughter of his father's advisor John Young, had twin illegitimate sons: Kīwalaʻō, who Kamehameha initially took to raise, died young, while the other twin Albert Kūnuiākea survived and was later adopted by Kamehameha and his wife Queen Kalama. Kūnuiākea lived to adulthood but died childless (1851–1902).

=== Government ===
Kamehameha III led the development of Hawaii's first formal written laws. In 1838, senior advisor Hoapili convinced former missionary William Richards to resign from the church and become a political advisor. Richards (although he had no legal training himself) gave classes to Kamehameha III and his councilors on the Western ideas of rule of law and economics. Their first act was a declaration of human rights in 1839.

In 1839, under a French threat of war, Roman Catholicism was legalized in the Edict of Toleration and the first statutory law code was established. Kamehameha III also enacted the Constitution of 1840, Hawaii's first. This laid the groundwork for the establishment of judicial and executive branches of government, and a system of land ownership was implemented under the Mahele in 1848. The 1839 declaration of rights, the 1840 constitution, and various laws enacted from 1840 to 1842 came to be collectively called the Kumu Kānāwai or "foundation of law." They were published together in a dual Hawaiian/English book with a blue cover, similar to the statutory laws of the New England states at the time, and like them became known in English as the Blue Laws. The Kumu Kānāwai was primarily based on Hawaii's indigenous traditions, various laws enacted since 1823, and the principles of the Christian Bible.

Over the next few years, Kamehameha III moved the capital from Lahaina to Honolulu. In September 1840 Charles Wilkes arrived on the United States Exploring Expedition. Kamehameha III was happy to support the explorers, and appointed missionary doctor Gerrit P. Judd to serve as translator. Judd treated many of the sailors who suffered from altitude sickness on their ascent of Mauna Loa. Wilkes vastly underestimated the task and did not leave until March 1841.

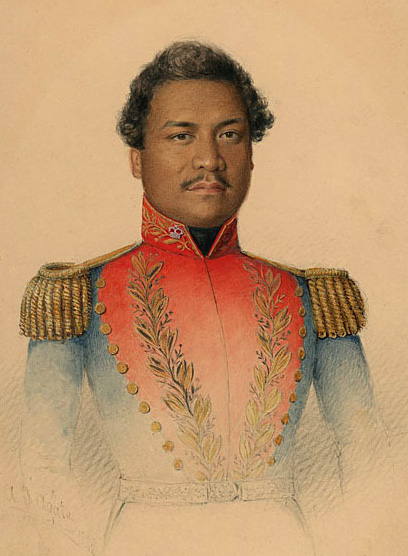
Portrait by Alfred Thomas Agate from the United States Exploring Expedition of 1838–1842 under Charles Wilkes

==== Paulet affair ====
In February 1843, British Captain Lord George Paulet pressured Kamehameha III into surrendering the Hawaiian kingdom to the British crown, but Kamehameha III alerted London of the captain's rogue actions which eventually restored the kingdom's independence. Less than five months later, British Admiral Richard Thomas rejected Paulet's actions and the kingdom was restored on July 31. It was at the end of this period of uncertainty that the king uttered the phrase Ua Mau ke Ea o ka ʻĀina i ka Pono, "the sovereignty of the land is perpetuated in righteousness". July 31 was celebrated thereafter as Lā Hoʻihoʻi Ea, Sovereignty Restoration Day, an official national holiday of the kingdom. Later that year, on November 28, Britain and France officially recognized the independence of the Hawaiian Kingdom, and that too became a national holiday, Lā Kūʻokoʻa — Independence Day.

==== Government reform ====
Through the 1840s a formal legislature of the Hawaiian Kingdom and cabinet replaced the informal council of chiefs. The chiefs became the House of Nobles, roughly modeled on the British House of Lords. Seven elected representatives would be the start of a democratic government. The cabinet consisted of a Privy Council and five powerful government ministers. Judd was appointed to the most powerful post of Minister of Finance. Frontier lawyer John Ricord was Attorney General, Robert Crichton Wyllie was Minister of Foreign Affairs, Richards Minister of Public Instruction, and Keoni Ana was Minister of the Interior.

Kamehameha III also presided over the formalization of the court system and land titles. Cases such as those of Richard Charlton and Ladd & Co. had prompted the incidents of 1843 and subsequent litigation. Under Kamehameha III, Hawaii rapidly transitioned from indigenous traditions to a new legal system based on Anglo-American common law. Lorrin Andrews became a judge for foreign cases in 1845. William Little Lee (the first to actually graduate from law school) became the first chief justice.

A commission to Quiet Land Titles was formed on February 10, 1846. This led to what is called the Great Mahele of 1848 which redistributed land between the government, king, nobles, and commoners. Foreigners were allowed to own land fee simple in Hawaii for the first time. Many commoners were unaware of the program and lost out on the distribution. The domination of his cabinet by Americans (balanced only by Scot Wyllie and half-Hawaiian Keoni Ana) also discouraged the people. This was not the end of foreign conflicts either. In 1849, Admiral Louis Tromelin led a French invasion of Honolulu. The French sacked and looted the city after the king refused his demands. In September 1849, Judd was sent with the heir apparent Prince Alexander Liholiho and Kamehameha V on a diplomatic mission. They returned with a new treaty with the United States but failed in visits to London and Paris.

The Constitution of 1852 and subsequent legislation continued to liberalize politics. The court system was unified, instead of having separate courts for Hawaiians and foreigners. Local Hawaiian magistrates became Circuit Judges, and a Supreme Court was formed with Lee, Andrews, and John Papa ʻĪʻī as members. Voting rules were formalized and the role of the House of Representatives was strengthened.

=== Later years ===
The California gold rush brought increased trade, but also some unwelcome visitors. Previously the long trips around Cape Horn or from Europe meant infected sailors were either recovered or buried at sea by the time they arrived. The short voyage from California brought several waves of diseases that decimated the Native Hawaiians who had no immunity. In the summer of 1853, an epidemic of smallpox caused thousands of deaths, mostly on the island of Oʻahu. Judd, always at odds with Wyllie, lost the backing of others who blamed him for not containing the disease (or had other political reasons to want him out of power). Judd was forced to resign on September 3 and was replaced by Elisha Hunt Allen as Minister of Finance.

In 1851, Scottish Australian entrepreneur and sailor Benjamin Boyd convinced King Kamehameha III to become regent of a Pacific empire ranging from Hawaii and the Marquesas to Samoa and Tonga. Boyd was killed in Guadalcanal shortly after.

Hawaii became a popular winter destination for frustrated prospectors in the 1850s. Some were rumored to be filibusters hoping to profit from a rebellion. One of the first was a group led by Samuel Brannan, who did not find the popular support for an uprising that they expected. By the end of 1853 the threats, whether real or imagined, caused petitions for the king to consider annexation to the United States. Wyllie and Lee convinced the king to insist that annexation would only be acceptable if Hawaii became a U.S. state.

In 1852, a group of missionaries set out from Hawaii for the islands of Micronesia. They carried with them a letter of introduction that bore the official seal of King Kamehameha III, the then-ruling monarch of the Hawaiian Islands. This letter, originally written in Hawaiian and addressed to the various rulers of the Pacific Islands, said in part: "There are about to sail for your islands some teachers of the Highest God, Jehovah, to make known unto you His Word for your eternal salvation. . . . I commend these good teachers to your esteem and friendship and exhort you to listen to their instructions. . . . I advise you to throw away your idols, take the Lord Jehovah for your God, worship and love Him and He will bless and save you."

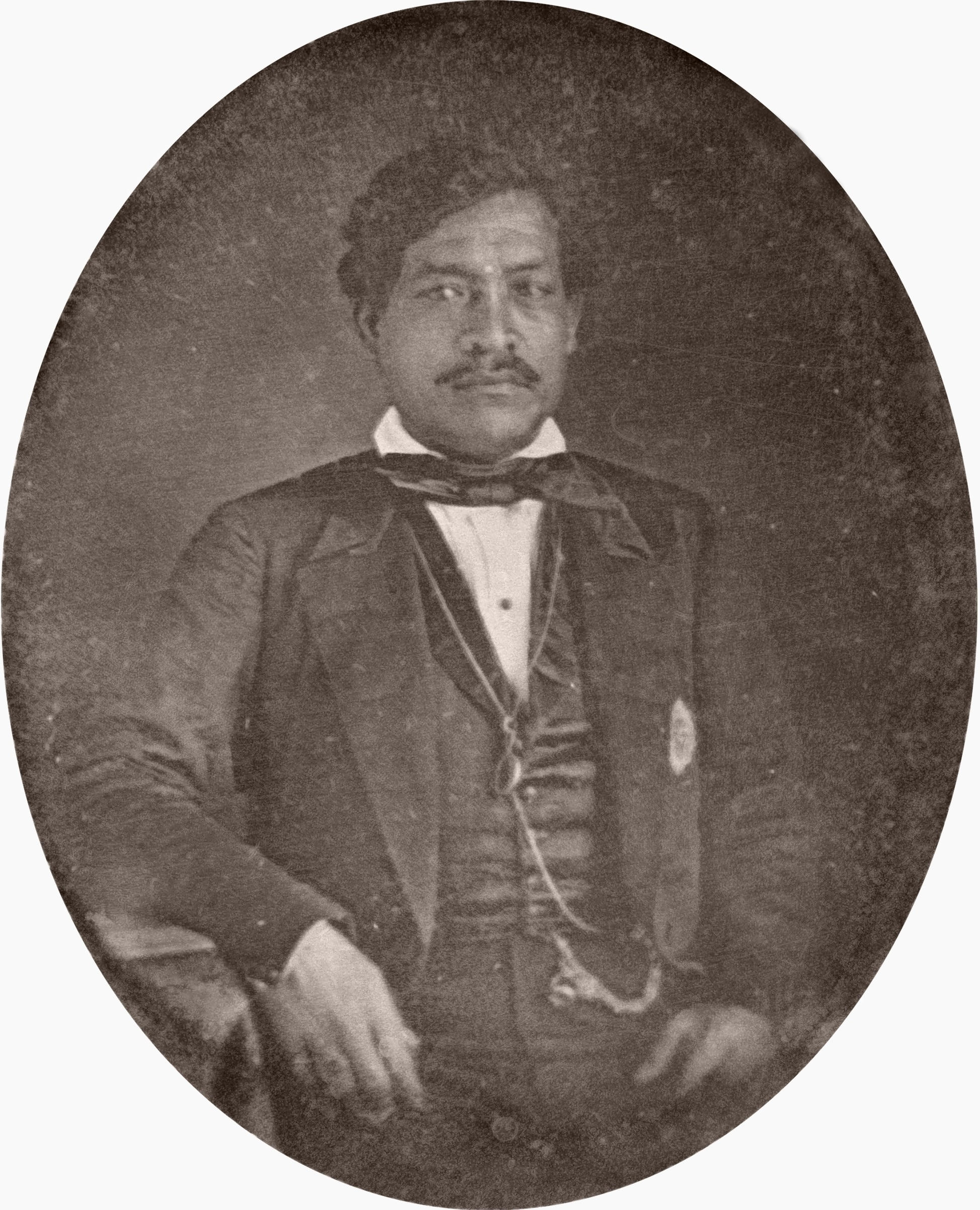

On May 16, 1854, King Kamehameha III proclaimed the Hawaiian Kingdom neutral in the Crimean War in Europe. The present crises had passed, but the king's health declined, often attributed to his renewed drinking. The annexation question also did not go away. The British minister William Miller and French representative Louis Emile Perrin objected to the plan. New U.S. Commissioner David L. Gregg received instructions from Secretary of State William L. Marcy and negotiated a treaty of annexation with Wyllie by August 1854. It was never signed, and might not have been ratified by the Senate. Although there was some support in the U.S., it would take 105 more years before full statehood of Hawaii.

== Death and funeral ==
Kamehameha III died suddenly on December 15, 1854, after a brief illness, which may have been related to a stroke.

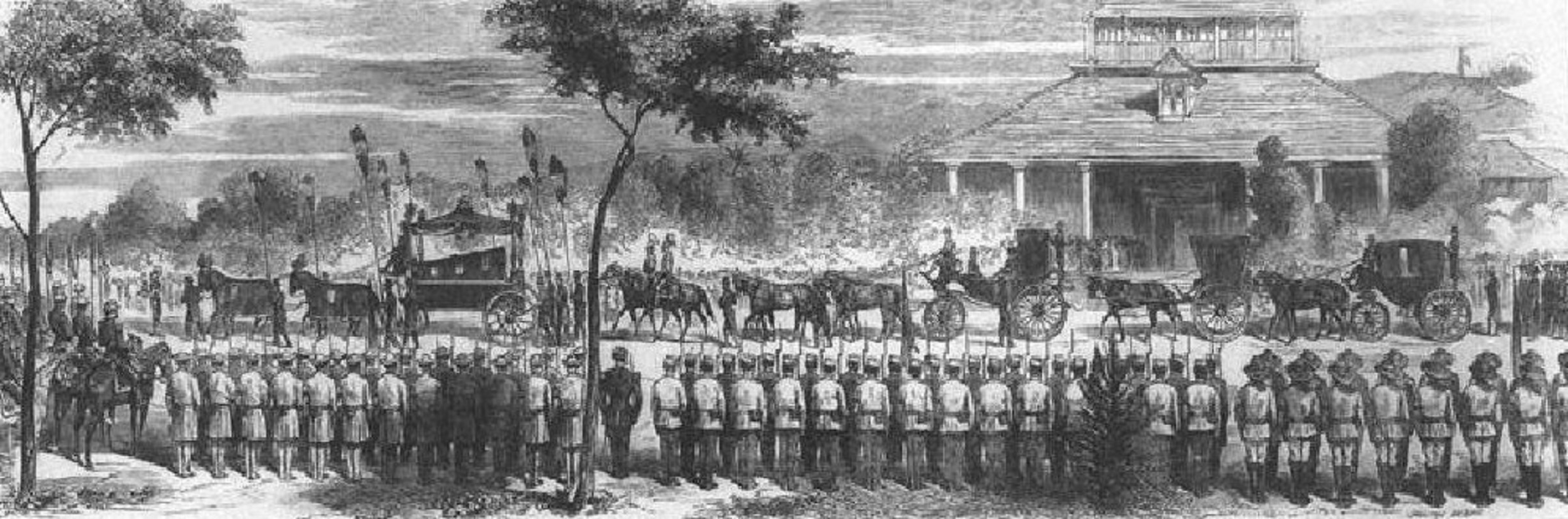
Funeral of Kamehameha III

He was succeeded by his nephew and adopted son Alexander Liholiho, who was styled as King Kamehameha IV.

In 1865, Kamehameha III was reburied in the Royal Mausoleum of Hawaii known as Mauna ʻAla.

== Legacy ==
The access to his birthplace at Keauhou Bay is via Kamehameha III Road from the north from Hawaii Belt Road, at 19°34′7″N 155°57′41″W and Kaleiopapa Street from the south at 19°33′31″N 155°57′41″W.

His successor described his reign:

The age of Kamehameha III was that of progress and of liberty—of schools and of civilization. He gave us a Constitution and fixed laws; he secured the people in the title to their lands, and removed the last chain of oppression. He gave them a voice in his councils and in the making of the laws by which they are governed. He was a great national benefactor, and has left the impress of his mild and amiable disposition on the age for which he was born.

On July 31, 2018, a 12-foot bronze statue of Kamehameha III and a flagpole flying the Hawaiian flag was unveiled at Thomas Square in a ceremony honoring the 175th anniversary of the restoration of Hawaiian sovereignty in 1843. The statue was created by Oregon artist Thomas Jay Warren for $250,000 allotted by the Mayor's Office of Culture and the Arts and is part of Mayor Kirk Caldwell's plans to revamp the park.

=== In popular culture ===
Kamalehua: The Sheltering Tree is a Hawaiian-language opera on his work relationship with his secretary and lifelong friend Timoteo Haʻalilio co-produced by Quinn Kelsey portraying the diplomat and Patrick Makuakāne as director and choreographer for the Hawaii Opera Theatre. The opera opened in the Neal S. Blaisdell Concert Hall in May 2026.

== Family tree ==
Kamehameha family tree

Kalaniʻōpuʻu (k)	Kalola (w)	Keōua (k)	Kekuʻiapoiwa II (w)	Kānekapōlei (w)
Kīwalaʻō	Kekuiapoiwa Liliha
Keōpūolani	Kamehameha I (The Great) (died 1819)	Kalākua Kaheiheimālie	Kaʻahumanu (1819–1832)
Liholiho; Kamehameha II (1819–1824)	Kamāmalu	Keouawahine	Pauli Kaʻōleiokū _{*Paternity is in question as daughter and mother both claim Kalaniopuu as the father.}	Kahailiopua; Luahine
Kauikeaouli; Kamehameha III (1825–1854)	Kalama	Elizabeth Kīnaʻu; Kaʻahumanu II	Mataio; Kekūanaōʻa	Pauahi	Laura Kōnia	Abner Pākī
Keaweaweʻulaokalani I	Keaweaweʻulaokalani II
Queen Emma	Alexander Liholiho; Kamehameha IV (1854–1863)	Lot Kapuāiwa; Kamehameha V (1863–1872)	Victoria Kamāmalu; Kaʻahumanu IV (1855–1863)	Ruth Keʻelikōlani	Charles Reed; Bishop	Bernice Pauahi; Bishop
Albert Kamehameha	John William Pitt Kīnaʻu	Keolaokalani Davis

== Ancestry ==
Ancestors of Kamehameha III

8. Keʻeaumoku Nui
4. Keōua Kalanikupuapaikalaninui (= 14)
9. Kamakaʻimoku
2. Kamehameha I
10. Haʻae-a-Mahi
5. Kekuʻiapoiwa II
11. Kekelakekeokalani-a-Keawe
1. Kamehameha III
12. Kalaniʻōpuʻu
6. Kīwalaʻō
13. Kalola Pupuka-o-Honokawailani (= 15)
3. Keōpūolani
14. Keōua Kalanikupuapaikalaninui (= 4)
7. Kekuʻiapoiwa Liliha
15. Kalola Pupuka-o-Honokawailani (= 13)

== See also ==
- List of bilateral treaties signed by the Kingdom of Hawaii

Hawaiian royalty
Preceded by Kamehameha II	King of Hawaiʻi; 1825–1854	Succeeded by Kamehameha IV
