= Naihekukui =

Hawaiian admiral (d. 1825)

Naihe Kukui Kapihe
- Admiral of the Kingdom of Hawaii
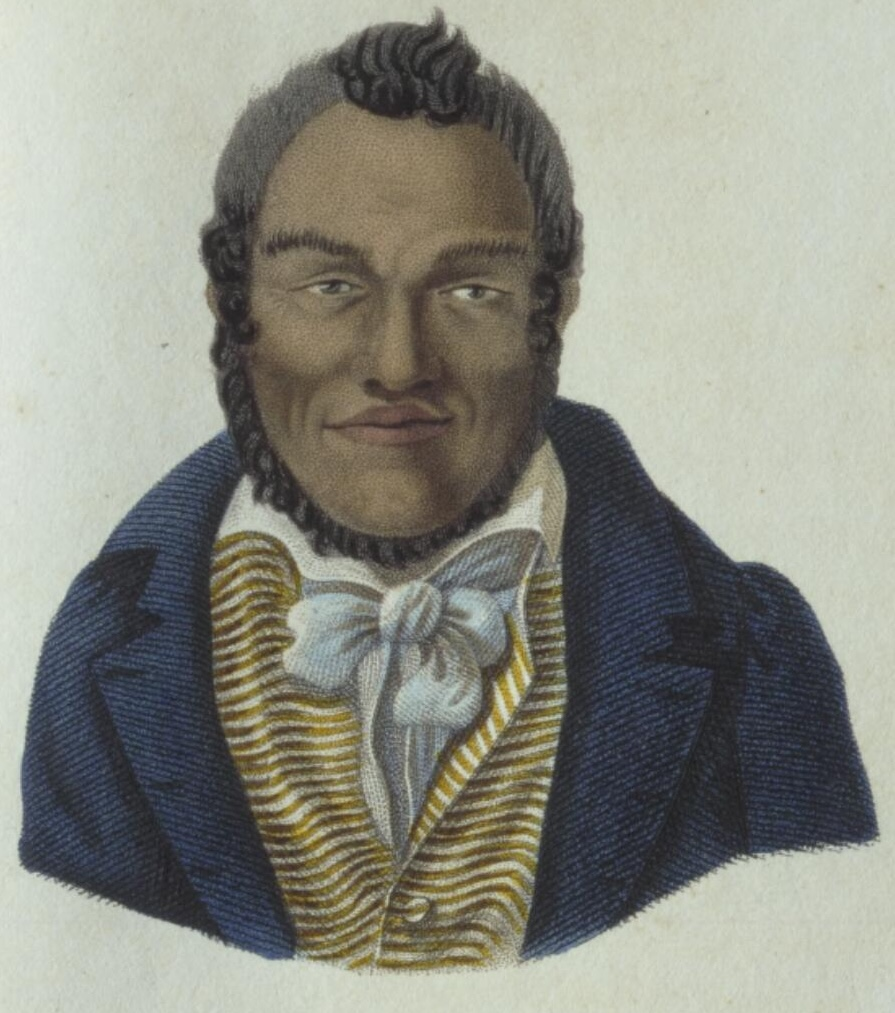
- On the 1819 voyage of Louis de Freycinet
- Died: February 8, 1825; Valparaíso, Chile
- Burial: at sea
- Spouse: I-Kapeʻekukai Iʻahuʻula
- Issue: Kalama Hakaleleponi Kapakuhaili
- Father: Hanakahi
- Mother: Piʻipiʻi

Naihe-Kukui Kapihe (died 1825), known as "Captain Jack" or "Jack the Pilot" to visitors, served as Honolulu harbor master and admiral of the royal fleet in the early Kingdom of Hawaii. His daughter would become a Queen consort.

== Life ==
He was royal harbor pilot at Honolulu during the time of Kamehameha I, and was the commander of native fleet of the Kingdom of Hawaii. He was known as "Captain Jack" by the non-Hawaiians visiting or living in Hawaii. His name was also sometimes spelled "Naihi-kukui" or "Naihi tutui". Other times he is mentioned having the name "Kapihe". He is recorded as guiding Russian Vasily Golovnin in 1818 and French explorers Louis de Freycinet and Camille de Roquefeuil in 1819. Louis de Freycinet calls him in French "premier pilote Kéihé-Koukoui, surnommé Jack".

His daughter Kalama Hakaleleponi Kapakuhaili (c. 1817–1870) would marry King Kamehameha III and become Queen consort. Kalama was the King's pick for a bride, despite having others with better family connections available. Naihe-kukui is often called a "chief of low rank", not to be confused with other people of that time with similar names.

He accompanied Kamehameha II on his trip to London in 1823, and died in Valparaíso, Chile on their return with Lord Byron on February 8, 1825. He was buried at sea. He was known to be a skilled player at the game of English draughts (also called "Checkers") because it was similar to the Hawaiian game called Kōnane.
