= Kalama =

Queen consort of Hawaiʻi (1817–1870)

Queen consort of the Hawaiian Islands
- Tenure: February 14, 1837 – December 15, 1854
- Born: March 17, 1817; Ka'elepulu near Kailua, Hawaii,
- Died: September 20, 1870 (aged 53); Honolulu, Oahu, Hawaii
- Burial: October 8, 1870; Mauna Ala
- Spouse: Kamehameha III
- Issue: Keaweaweʻulaokalani I Keaweaweʻulaokalani II
Names
- Kalama Hakaleleponi Kapakuhaili
- House: House of Kamehameha
- Father: High Chief Naihekukui
- Mother: High Chiefess Iʻahuʻula

Kalama Hakaleleponi Kapakuhaili (1817 – September 20, 1870) was a Queen consort of the Kingdom of Hawaiʻi alongside her husband, Kauikeaouli, who reigned as King Kamehameha III. She chose the baptismal name Hakaleleponi after the Biblical figure Hazzelelponi. Her name Kalama means "the torch" in the Hawaiian language.

== Early life ==
She was the only child of Kona chief Naihekukui, who was commander of the native Hawaiian fleet at Honolulu. Her mother was Chiefess Iʻahuʻula, the younger sister of Charles Kanaʻina. Kanaʻina would become hānai (Hawaiian form of adoption) parent of the child.

== Marriage ==
The young Kamehameha III, the boy king at the time, was needing a suitable royal bride. Many of the traditional chiefs wanted a union between the king and his sister Nāhiʻenaʻena, as had been customary in the Hawaiian court since its beginning; however, the Christian missionaries and chiefs, who held significant political power, opposed this suggestion, calling it incest.

Kamanele, the daughter of Governor John Adams Kuakini, was proposed as the most suitable in age, rank, and education. However, she also died young. The young king fell in love with Kalama in 1832. This angered his sister Kīnaʻu and many of the high chiefs. Kamehameha III married her on February 14, 1837. This was only a few months after Nāhiʻenaʻena's death.

== Children ==
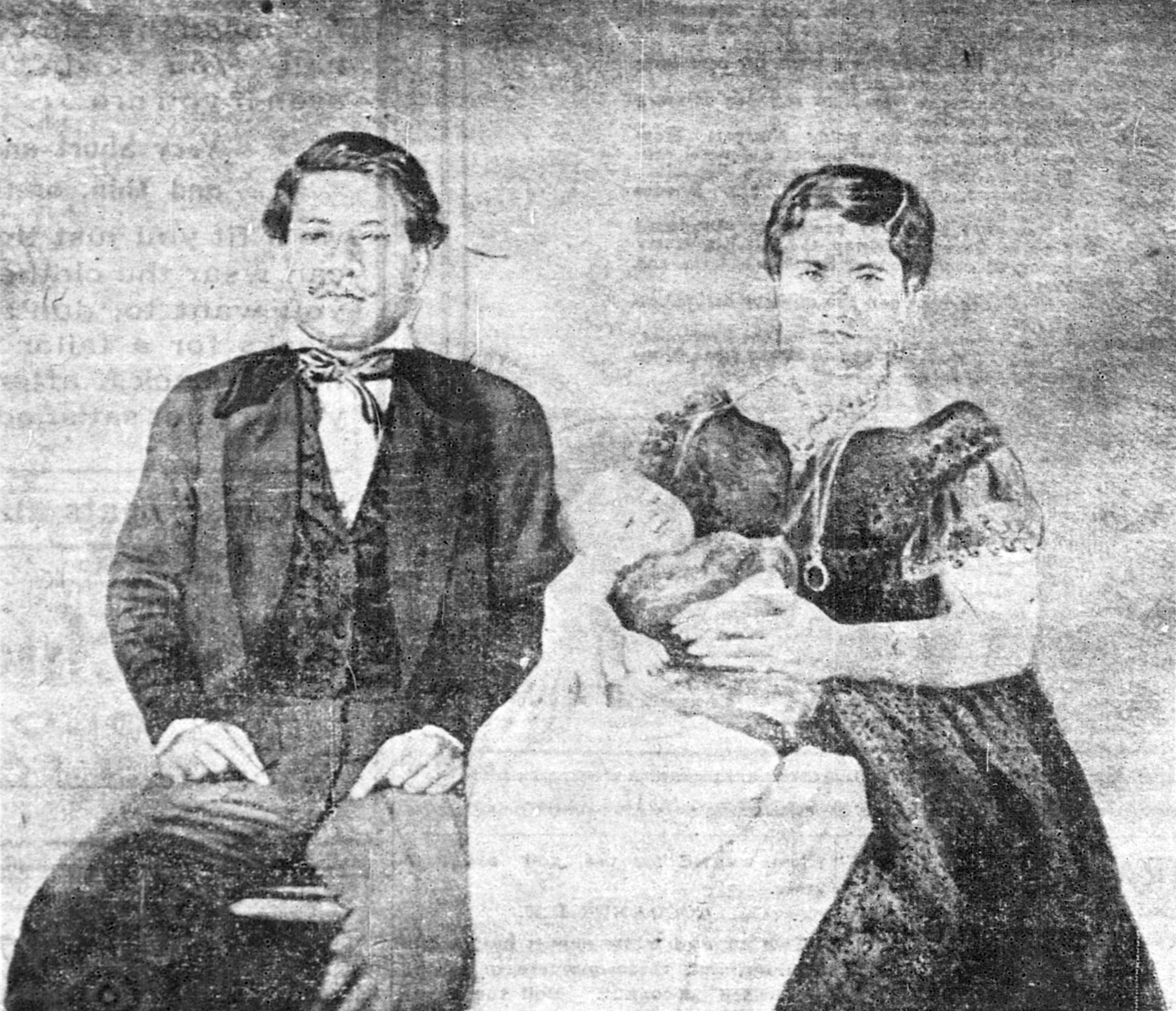
Kamehameha III and Queen Kalama with Albert Kūnuiākea.

Kalama and Kamehameha III had two children who died in their infancy. Both were named Keaweaweulaokalani, after their father.

She and Kamehameha III would later hānai (adopt) their nephew Alexander Liholiho, who later became Kamehameha IV. She also adopted Kaʻiminaʻauao, the daughter of Analea Keohokālole and Caesar Kapaʻakea as her own. She even adopted her husband's son Albert Kukaʻilimoku Kunuiakea by Jane Lahilahi Young.

== Later life ==
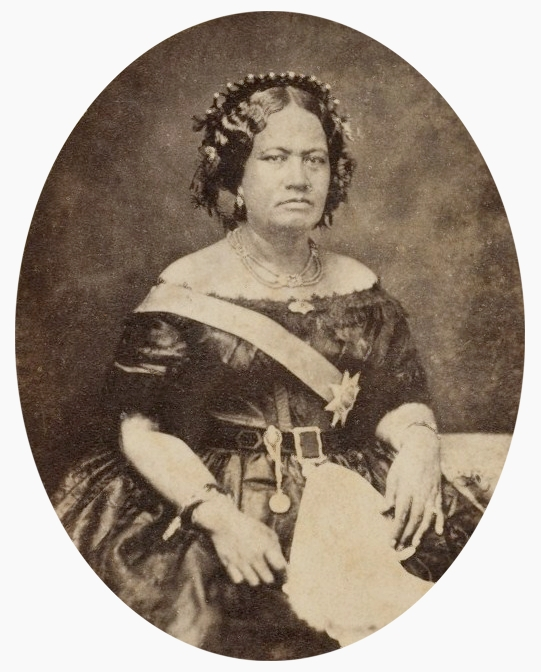
Queen Dowager Kalama in 1862

She would outlive both her husband Kamehameha III and her nephew Kamehameha IV, becoming known as the Queen dowager of Hawaii. She met Prince Alfred on his visit to Hawaii in the reign of Kamehameha V. She drove out to Waikīkī in her own carriage of state, accompanied by her adopted son, Kunuiakea, and Miriam Likelike. The drivers of these carriages wore the royal feather shoulder capes, and the footmen were clad in like royal fashion. It was considered one of the grandest occasions in the history of those days. Kalama skillfully managed her properties and at the time of her death, she owned over 22,000 acres on the windward side of the island of Oahu. She died intestate, and thus, her uncle Charles Kanaina was declared as the heir to her vast lands and properties.

She died on September 20, 1870, in Honolulu at the age of 53. On September 21, American marines had to be landed to place the American flag at half-mast, when the American consul at Honolulu would not assume responsibility for doing so, owing to a past instance where the Queen's death was falsely reported.

== Namesakes ==
- Hakaleleponi Gate, an entrance for servants and attendants in ʻIolani Palace, is named after her.
- In 1925, Harold K.L. Castle developed Kailua's first housing tract and named it Kalama after the Queen, who previously had owned the land in the Kailua area.
- Kalama Beach Park, the former Boettcher Estate, became a municipal park in 1978 and was listed on the National Register of Historic Places in 2002.

== Bibliography ==
- Gilman, Gorham D. (1894). Thrum, Thomas G. (ed.). "Old Time Hawaiian Coasting Service – A Reminiscent Sketch by Hon. G. D. Gilman". Hawaiian Almanac and Annual for 1894. Honolulu: Honolulu Star-Bulletin. pp. 84–90. hdl:10524/668.
- Gregg, David L. (1982). King, Pauline (ed.). The Diaries of David Lawrence Gregg: An American Diplomat in Hawaii, 1853–1858. Honolulu: Hawaiian Historical Society. ISBN 9780824808617. OCLC 8773139.

Royal titles
Preceded by Kamāmalu	Queen consort of Hawaiʻi; 1837 – 1854	Succeeded by Queen Emma
Preceded by Kaʻahumanu	Queen dowager of Hawaiʻi; 1854 – 1870	Succeeded by Queen Emma
