= John William Pitt Kīnaʻu =

Prince of the Kingdom of Hawaiʻi (1842–1859)

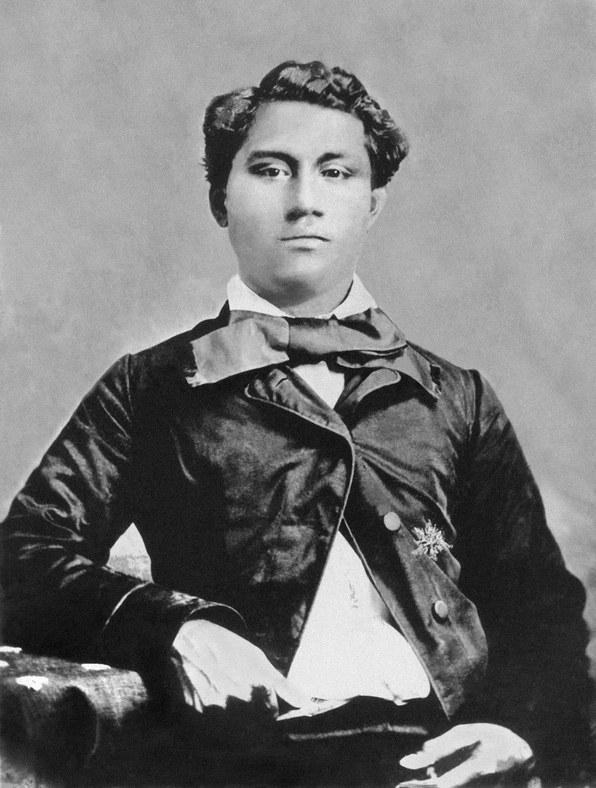
- Born: December 21/27, 1842; Honolulu, Oahu, Kingdom of Hawaii
- Died: September 9, 1859 (aged 16); Kapaʻau, Kohala, Hawaii Island, Kingdom of Hawaii
- Burial: November 6, 1859; Pohukaina Tomb; October 30, 1865; Mauna ʻAla Royal Mausoleum
- House: House of Kamehameha
- Father: William Pitt Leleiohoku I
- Mother: Ruth Keʻelikōlani

John William Pitt Kīnaʻu (December 21/27, 1842 – September 9, 1859) was a prince of the Kingdom of Hawaii and the only surviving son of High Chief William Pitt Leleiohoku I and Ruth Keʻelikōlani. As a descendant of King Kamehameha I, he was chosen to attend the Chiefs' Children's School (later renamed Royal School) taught by the American missionary Amos Starr Cooke and his wife, Juliette Montague Cooke, alongside fifteen of his royal cousins. At a young age, he inherited the landholdings of his father and his adoptive grandfather including Huliheʻe Palace, but the prince died under mysterious circumstances before his seventeenth birthday.

== Early life and family ==
Kīnaʻu was born December 21/27, 1842, Honolulu, on the island of Oahu. (Note: His birthdate was inscribed as December 27, 1842 on his coffin, according to an 1865 newspaper article in the Ke Au Okoa. While in his obituary in The Polynesian and David Parker's Tales of Our Hawaiʻi, his birthdate is noted as December 21.) His father was High Chief William Pitt Leleiohoku I (1821–1848) and his mother was High Ruth Keʻelikōlani (1826–1883). Through his mother he was Kamehameha I's great-great-grandchild. His mother's parentage was disputed, but she was a member of the House of Kamehameha through her own mother Pauahi. His recognized maternal grandfather was Kekūanaōʻa, who was the Governor of Oahu. Through his father, he descended from King Kekaulike of Maui. His father was the biological son of Prime Minister Kalanimoku, who was called The Iron Cable of Hawaii because of his political savvy and military prowess. His name "William Pitt", shared by his father and grandfather, was originally chosen by Kalanimoku in honor of Prime Minister William Pitt of England. His Hawaiian name Kīnaʻu was given in honor of the Kuhina Nui, Kīnaʻu, Keʻelikōlani's stepmother and childhood guardian. She in turn was named after High Chief Kahōʻanokū Kīnaʻu. He had an unnamed younger brother who died in infancy. During his infancy, he was raised in a large hale pili (thatched house) named Auanakeo, which stood outside the Huliheʻe Palace, the principal residence of Leleiohoku's hānai (adoptive) father Kuakini, who was the Governor of Hawaii Island.

From 1842 until his death in 1844, Governor Kuakini served as a grandfather figure to the child. In 1928 Lucy Kaopaulu Peabody, a hapa-haole (part Caucasian) chiefess, (Note: Lucy Kaopaulu Peabody was a great-granddaughter of Isaac Davis; she was 3/8 Hawaiian and 5/8 Caucasian.) recalled a scuffle between her and Kīnaʻu in their youth during a visit she and her grandmother paid to the Governor:

One day when we were living at Kawaihae my grandmother went to Hulihee to see Kuakini, who was not well. I went with her and when Kinau saw me he chased me as he always did. I think he did not like me. I ran to my grandmother and she protected me. Kuakini saw me and said to my grandmother to let the haole go and told us to "hakaka" (fight). She did and we fought. I beat him. Kuakini made fun of Kinau who was about six (Note: Kuakini died in December 9, 1844, nineteen days short of the Kīnaʻu's second birthday.) years old then.

== Education and career ==
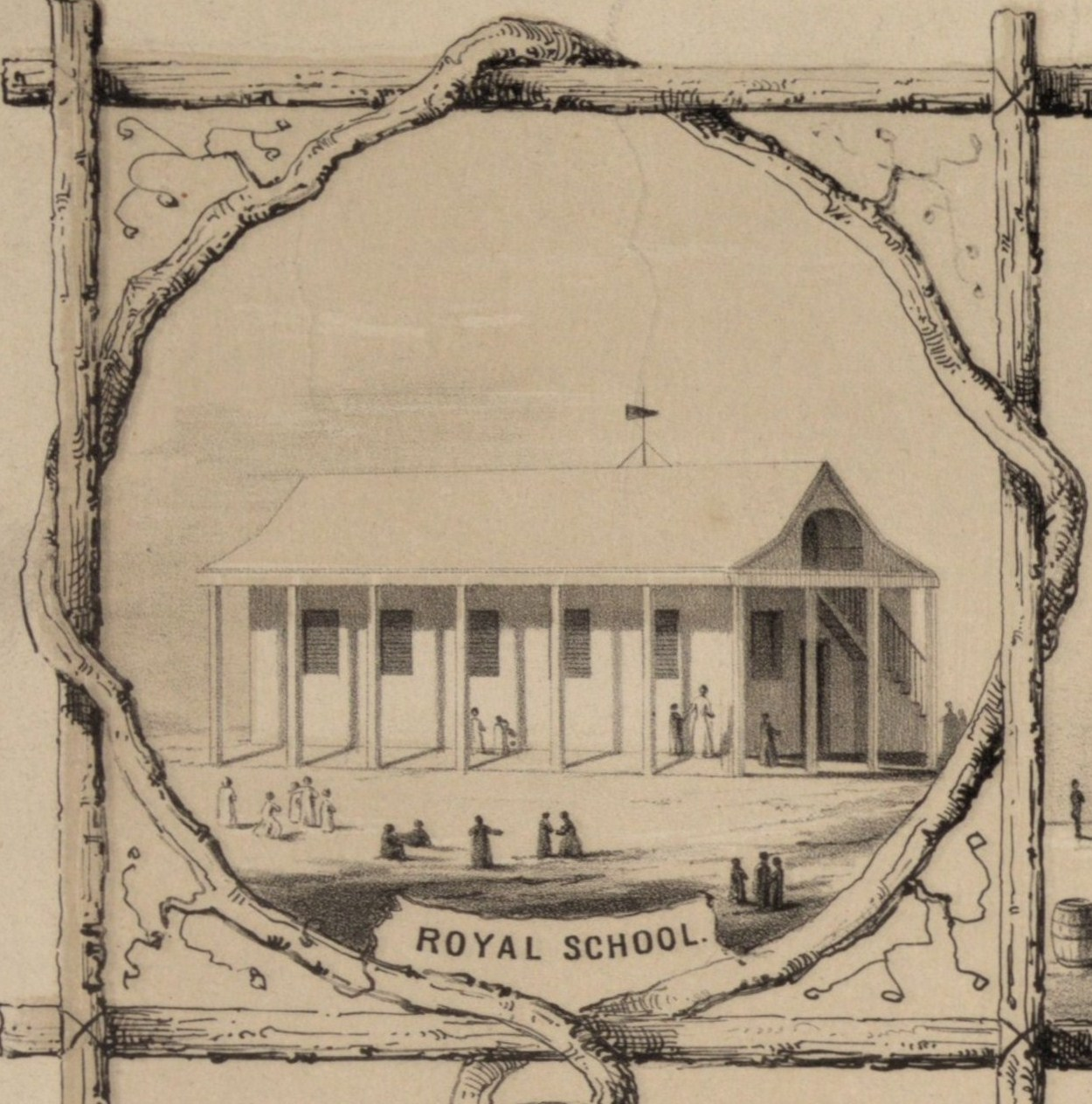
The Royal School in 1853, lithographed by Paul Emmert

Kīnaʻu entered the Chiefs' Children's School (later renamed the Royal School) on February 26, 1844, at the age of two as its sixteenth and last pupil. He was the youngest with Victoria Kamāmalu and Lydia Kamakaʻeha, both being four years older. He was chosen by Kamehameha III to be eligible for the throne of the Kingdom of Hawaii. He was taught in English by American missionaries Amos Starr Cooke and his wife, Juliette Montague Cooke, alongside his royal cousins. During their Sunday procession to church it was customary for boys and girls to walk side by side, Kīnaʻu would walk beside Lydia Kamakaʻeha, the future Queen Liliʻuokalani of Hawaii. In Liliʻuokalani's memoir, he is mentioned as John Kīnaʻu Pitt. The boarding school discontinued in 1850, and his family sent him to the day school (also called Royal School) ran by Reverend Edward G. Beckwith along with his former classmates Victoria Kamāmalu and Lydia Kamakaʻeha and new classmates Gideon Laʻanui, Nancy Sumner, Jane and Martha Swinton, and Mary Waterhouse. During his youth, the prince was often found on the parade ground of the old Honolulu Fort, instructing his friends while they were drilling as boy scouts. Kīnaʻu was considered to be a promising young man with an extremely bright mind and leadership qualities.

In January 1850, a correspondent of the American newspaper Rochester Democrat & Chronicle in Honolulu gave a description of the royal children and his impression of Kīnaʻu (the only he mentioned by name):

The young princes and children of the royal family are taught to speak English, and learn very rapidly; indeed little John Pitt, a son of the same name, speaks it as fluently as any American boy of his age. He is a fine little fellow, very forward in his studies, quick and sprightly, and will be an influential man.

In 1848 his father died of measles, followed by his classmate Moses Kekūāiwa and Liliʻuokalani's sister Kaʻiminaʻauao. Leleiohoku, the sixth-largest landholder after the Great Mahele, had inherited the estates of his biological father Kalanimoku and his hānai (adoptive) father Kuakini, two of the most power chiefs in the kingdom. Leleiohoku had received thirty-six ʻāina (land parcels), mainly on the island of Hawaiʻi and Maui from King Kamehameha III. Thus after Leleiohoku's death, Kīnaʻu became the heir to all his father's property, including Huliheʻe Palace in Kailua-Kona. His ample inheritance made him one of the wealthiest people in the kingdom. He was popularly called the "Prince of Kona" during his lifetime. On his sixteen birthday, the ambitious young prince asked his former classmate King Kamehameha IV to award him with all the lands whose names started with "Wai" (Hawaiian for "water") such as Waimea, Waianae, Waikapu, Wailuku, Waihee, Waialua, Waikane and so on, a request that the King refused. After completing his education, Kīnaʻu served as aide-de-camp to King Kamehameha IV, and in his lifetime, he was considered "a very handsome young man". Like his mother in later life, Kīnaʻu was often associated with supernatural power due to his royal rank. During a trip to the island of Hawaii in January 1859, his arrival on the island coincided with the eruption of Mauna Loa. It was reported that "it was believed by large proportion of the native population of the island, that Pele had thrown forth the lava stream in special honor of his arrival".

== Death and burial ==
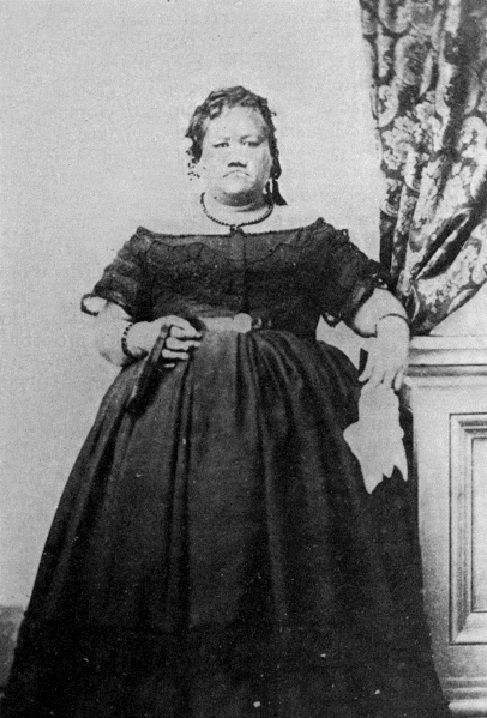
Kīnaʻu's premature death left his mother Keʻelikōlani heartbroken.

Kīnaʻu died on September 9, 1859, in Kapaʻau, Kohala district on the island of Hawaiʻi. The cause of his death was said to be an accident, although the details are unknown. An accusation of poisoning was forwarded by a noted priest and the whole of Kona became outraged over the rumors. One source claimed he was killed in a riding accident. His obituary in the Hawaiian newspapers The Polynesian and The Pacific Commercial Advertiser claimed it was consumption.

Heartbroken over the loss of her husband and son, Keʻelikōlani kept his lead coffin in her house for weeks, with mourners chanting and reciting the traditional Hawaiian kanikau (poetic dirges) night and day. On November 24, the remains of the prince were transported back to Oahu, on board the schooler Kaluna, for a proper burial suited for his rank. The state funeral procession occurred on December 27, and was attended by thousands of natives, foreign residents and visitors including the royal family and members of the government. Russian traveler Aleksei Vysheslavtsev, who arrived in Honolulu days before, later wrote down a detailed account of the events in Ocherki perom i karandashom, iz krugosvetnogo plavaniya (Sketches in Pen and Pencil from a Voyage around the World). A contradictory report by Scottish traveling performer John Henry Anderson described an earlier funeral service for the prince which was held at Kawaiahaʻo Church on Sunday, November 6. The funeral was estimated to have cost at least $10,000.

Initially buried in the Pohukaina Tomb, located on grounds of ʻIolani Palace, his remains were later transported along with those of his father's and other royals in a midnight torchlight procession on October 30, 1865, to the newly constructed Royal Mausoleum at Mauna ʻAla in the Nuʻuanu Valley. His mother's remains were also buried here after her death in 1883. In 1887, after the Mausoleum building became too crowded, the coffins belonging to members of the Kamehameha Dynasty including Kīnaʻu's were moved to the newly built Kamehameha Tomb. The name "W. P. Kinau" was inscribed on the mauka (mountainward) side of the monument above his final resting place.

== Legacy ==
His landholdings and properties along with Huliheʻe Palace were inherited by his mother; beside his estates, Keʻelikōlani also inherited much of her son's debt. These lands along with subsequent inheritances that Keʻelikōlani would receive over her lifetime later became part of the Bernice Pauahi Bishop Estate which funds the Kamehameha Schools to this day.

Historian Albert Pierce Taylor, calling him by the name of "Liliulani", gave this posthumous description of the prince:

He was one of the most ambitious and promising of the young princes of the Kamehameha realm. It is believed by old Hawaiians today that had he lived he would have become a real and constructive leader of the Hawaiian people. He had a splendid physique and a magnetic personality. The glance of his eyes made him friends everywhere.

== Bibliography ==
- Alexander, William DeWitt (1894). "The "Hale o Keawe" at Honaunau, Hawaii". Journal of the Polynesian Society. 3. London: E. A. Petherick: 159–161. OCLC 6015245150.
- Anderson, John Henry (1939). "Professor John Henry Anderson "The Wizard of the North" at Honolulu in 1859". Forty-Seventh Annual Report of the Hawaiian Historical Society for the Year 1938. Honolulu: Hawaiian Historical Society: 50–70. hdl:10524/38. OCLC 472064854.
- Biographical Sketch of His Majesty King Kalakaua. Honolulu: P. C. Advertiser Steam Printing Office. 1884. pp. 72–74. OCLC 12787107.
- Cracroft, Sophia; Franklin, Jane; Queen Emma (1958). Korn, Alfons L. (ed.). The Victorian Visitors: An Account of the Hawaiian Kingdom, 1861–1866, Including the Journal Letters of Sophia Cracroft: Extracts from the Journals of Lady Franklin, and Diaries and Letters of Queen Emma of Hawaii. Honolulu: University of Hawaii Press. hdl:10125/39981. ISBN 978-0-87022-421-8. OCLC 8989368.
- Cooke, Amos Starr; Cooke, Juliette Montague (1937). Richards, Mary Atherton (ed.). The Chiefs' Children School: A Record Compiled from the Diary and Letters of Amos Starr Cooke and Juliette Montague Cooke, by Their Granddaughter Mary Atherton Richards. Honolulu: Honolulu Star-Bulletin. OCLC 1972890.
- Del Piano, Barbara (2009). "Kalanimoku: Iron Cable of the Hawaiian Kingdom, 1769–1827". Hawaiian Journal of History. 43. Honolulu: Hawaiian Historical Society: 1–28. hdl:10524/12237. OCLC 60626541.
- Forbes, David W., ed. (2001). Hawaiian National Bibliography, 1780–1900, Volume 3: 1851–1880. Vol. 3. Honolulu: University of Hawaii Press. pp. 338–339. ISBN 978-0-8248-2503-4. OCLC 123279964.
- Hawaii Supreme Court; Davis, Robert G. (1866). "L. Keelikolani v. James Robinson". Reports of a Portion of the Decisions Rendered by the Supreme Court of the Hawaiian Islands in Law, Equity, Admiralty, and Probate. Vol. 2. Honolulu: Government Press. pp. 514–552. OCLC 29559942.
- Judd, Walter F. (1975). Palaces and Forts of the Hawaiian Kingdom: From Thatch to American Florentine. Palo Alto, CA: Pacific Books, Publishers. ISBN 978-0-87015-216-0. OCLC 2073825.
- Kam, Ralph Thomas (2017). Death Rites and Hawaiian Royalty: Funerary Practices in the Kamehameha and Kalakaua Dynasties, 1819–1953. S. I.: McFarland, Incorporated, Publishers. ISBN 978-1-4766-6846-8. OCLC 966566652.
- Kamakau, Samuel (1992) [1961]. Ruling Chiefs of Hawaii (Revised ed.). Honolulu: Kamehameha Schools Press. ISBN 0-87336-014-1. OCLC 25008795.
- Kameʻeleihiwa, Lilikalā (1992). Native Land and Foreign Desires. Honolulu: Bishop Museum Press. ISBN 0-930897-59-5. OCLC 154146650.
- Kuykendall, Ralph Simpson (1965) [1938]. The Hawaiian Kingdom 1778–1854, Foundation and Transformation. Vol. 1. Honolulu: University of Hawaii Press. ISBN 0-87022-431-X. OCLC 47008868.
- Liliuokalani (1898). Hawaii's Story by Hawaii's Queen, Liliuokalani. Boston: Lee and Shepard. ISBN 978-0-548-22265-2. OCLC 2387226.
- Parker, David "Kawika" (2008). "Crypts of the Ali`i The Last Refuge of the Hawaiian Royalty". Tales of Our Hawaiʻi (PDF). Honolulu: Alu Like, Inc. OCLC 309392477. Archived from the original (PDF) on November 11, 2013.
- Peterson, Barbara Bennett (1984). Notable Women of Hawaii. Honolulu: University of Hawaii Press. ISBN 978-0-8248-0820-4. OCLC 11030010.
- Silva, Kalena; Johnson, Rubellite Kawena; Nogelmeier, Puakea (2003). "Princess Ruth Keʻelikōlani". Biography Hawaiʻi: Five Lives; A Series of Public Remembrances (PDF). Honolulu: University of Hawaii. pp. 1–17. Archived from the original (PDF) on June 6, 2014.
- Schmitt, Robert C.; Nordyke, Eleanor C. (2001). "Death in Hawai'i: The Epidemics of 1848–1849". Hawaiian Journal of History. 35. Honolulu: Hawaiian Historical Society: 1–13. hdl:10524/339. OCLC 60626541.
- Taylor, Albert Pierce (1922). Under Hawaiian Skies: A Narrative of the Romance, Adventure and History of the Hawaiian Islands. Honolulu: Advertiser Publishing Company, Ltd. OCLC 479709.
- Topolinski, John Renken Kahaʻi (1981). "Nancy Sumner, Hawaiian Courtlady". Hawaiian Journal of History. 15. Honolulu: Hawaiian Historical Society: 50–58. hdl:10524/285. OCLC 60626541.
- Van Dyke, Jon M. (2008). Who Owns the Crown Lands of Hawaiʻi?. Honolulu: University of Hawaii Press. ISBN 978-0-8248-6560-3. OCLC 257449971 – via Project MUSE.
- Winne, Jane Lathrop (1928). Kuakini and Hulihee: the Story of the Kailua Palace, Kona, Hawaii. Honolulu. OCLC 16333276.
- Wiswell, Ella L. (1983). "Russian Traveler's Impressions of Hawaii and Tahiti, 1859–1860". Hawaiian Journal of History. 17. Honolulu: Hawaiian Historical Society: 76–142. hdl:10524/390. OCLC 60626541.
- Zambucka, Kristin (1977). The High Chiefess: Ruth Keelikolani. Honolulu: Mana Publishing Company. OCLC 3836213.
