= List of Hawaiian monarchs =

Monarchy of Hawaiʻi
- Royal Coat of Arms (1845)

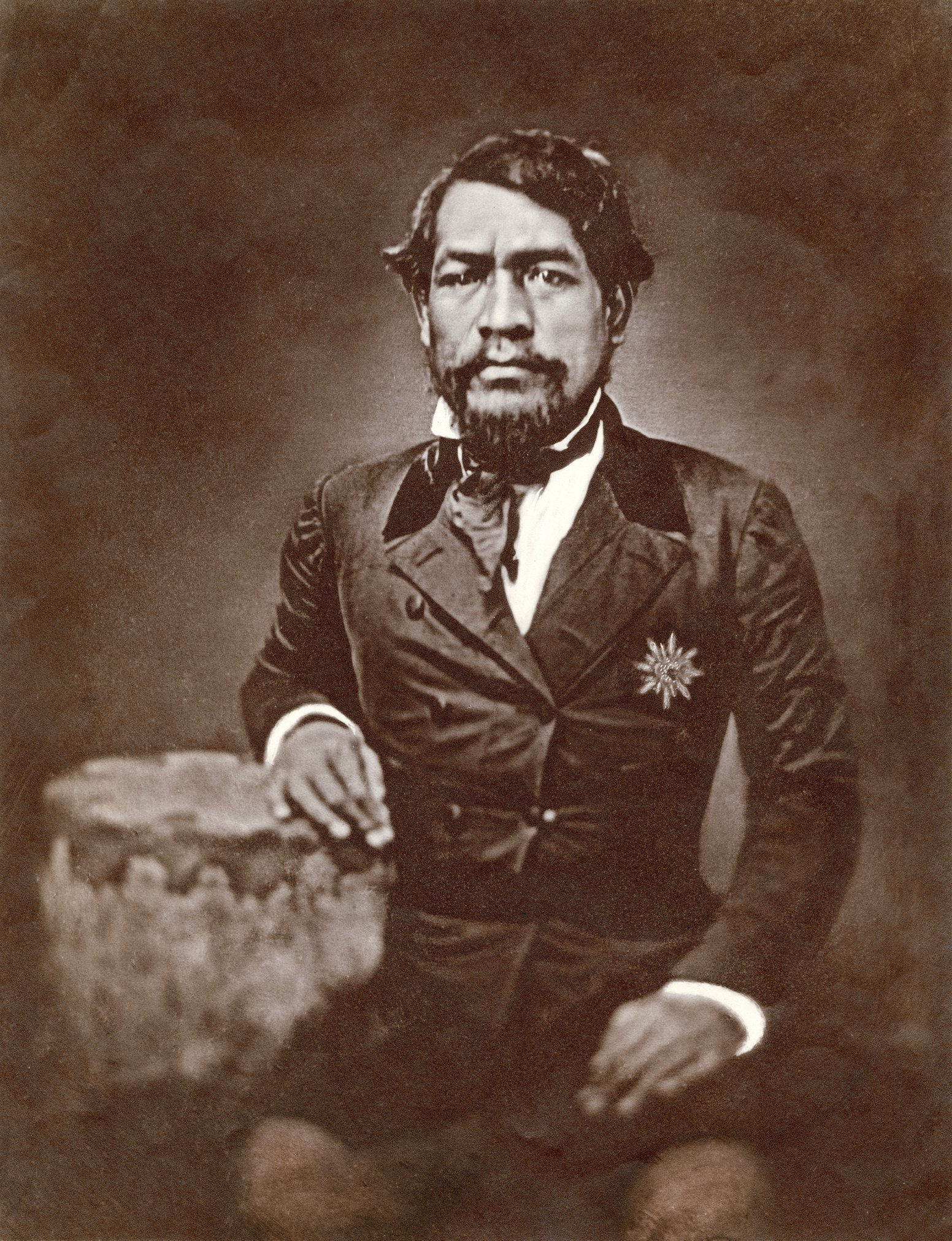
- Longest reigning Kamehameha III; June 6, 1825 – December 15, 1854

Details
- Style: See below
- First monarch: Kamehameha I
- Last monarch: Liliʻuokalani
- Formed: 1795
- Abolished: 1893 (de facto); 1895 (de jure)
- Residence: ʻIolani Palace (1845–1893)
- Pretender: Quentin Kawānanakoa (disputed)

Kamehameha I established the Hawaiian Kingdom in 1795 after conquering most of the Hawaiian Islands. In 1810, Kaumualiʻi became a vassal of Kamehameha I, who therefore emerged as the sole sovereign of the island chain of Hawaiʻi. His dynasty lasted until 1872, and his Kingdom lasted until 1893, when Queen Liliʻuokalani, of the Kalākaua dynasty, was deposed by pro-United States businessmen who led the overthrow of the Hawaiian Kingdom. The monarchy was officially ended on January 24, 1895, when Liliʻuokalani formally abdicated in response to an attempt to restore the royal government. On November 23, 1993, the Congress passed Public Law 103-150, also known as the Apology Resolution, acknowledging the American role in the overthrow of the Hawaiian monarchy. President Bill Clinton signed the joint resolution the same day.

While the current claimant to the throne of Hawaii is disputed, Quentin Kawānanakoa is considered to be the most accepted titular head of the throne of Hawaii.

== Hawaiian monarchs (1795–1893) ==
Name	Portrait	Birth	Marriage(s)	Death
Kamehameha I Spring, 1795 – May 8, 1819		c. 1758; Moʻokini Heiau, Kohala, Hawaiʻi island son of Keōua and Kekuʻiapoiwa	various	May 8, 1819; Kamakahonu, Kailua-Kona, Kona, Hawaiʻi island aged 61?
Kamehameha II; May 20, 1819 – July 14, 1824		November 1797; Hilo, Hawaiʻi island son of Kamehameha I and Keōpūolani	(1) Kamāmalu (2) Kīnaʻu (3) Kekāuluohi (4) Kalanipauahi (5) Kekauʻōnohi (6) Kekaihaʻakūlou	July 14, 1824; Caledonian Hotel, London, England aged 27
Kamehameha III; June 6, 1825 – December 15, 1854		August 11, 1813; Keauhou Bay, North Kona, Hawaiʻi island son of Kamehameha I and Keōpūolani	Kalama; Honolulu, Oʻahu; 14 February 1837 two sons	December 15, 1854; Honolulu, Oʻahu aged 41
Kamehameha IV; January 11, 1855 – November 30, 1863		February 9, 1834; Honolulu, Oʻahu biological son of Kekūanaōʻa and Kīnaʻu and hānai son of Kamehameha III and Kalama	Emma Rooke; Kawaiahaʻo Church, Honolulu, Oʻahu; 19 June 1856 one son	November 30, 1863; Honolulu, Oʻahu aged 29
Kamehameha V November 30, 1863 – December 11, 1872		December 11, 1830; Honolulu, Oʻahu biological son of Kekūanaōʻa and Kīnaʻu and hānai son of Nāhiʻenaʻena (later) Hoapili and Kaheiheimālie	Never married	December 11, 1872 ʻIolani Palace, Honolulu, Oʻahu aged 42
Lunalilo; January 8, 1873 – February 3, 1874		January 31, 1835; Pohukaina, Honolulu, Oʻahu son of Kanaʻina and Kekāuluohi	Never married	February 3, 1874; Haimoeipo, Honolulu, Oʻahu aged 39
Kalākaua; February 12, 1874 – January 20, 1891		November 16, 1836; Honolulu, Oʻahu biological son of Kapaʻakea and Keohokālole and hānai son of Kinimaka and Haʻaheo Kaniu	Kapiʻolani; Honolulu, Oʻahu; December 19, 1863	January 20, 1891; Palace Hotel, San Francisco, California, United States aged 54
Liliʻuokalani; January 29, 1891 – January 17, 1893		September 2, 1838; Honolulu, Oʻahu biological daughter of Kapaʻakea and Keohokālole and hānai daughter of Pākī and Kōnia	John Owen Dominis ʻAikupika, Haleakala Estate, Honolulu, Oʻahu; September 16, 1862	November 11, 1917; Washington Place, Honolulu, Oʻahu aged 79

== Disputed monarchs (1893–1895) ==
Liliʻuokalani was disputed as queen of Hawaii from 1893 to 1895 after she was overthrown in 1893 but continued to claim the throne while the Provisional Government led by Sanford B. Dole ruled for her. Her claim ended in 1895 after a failed attempt to restore the monarchy, after she was arrested and was forced to formally abdicate.

Name	Portrait	Birth	Marriage(s)	Death
Liliʻuokalani; January 17, 1893 – January 24, 1895		September 2, 1838; Honolulu, Oʻahu biological daughter of Kapaʻakea and Keohokālole and hānai daughter of Pākī and Kōnia	John Owen Dominis ʻAikupika, Haleakala Estate, Honolulu, Oʻahu; September 16, 1862	November 11, 1917; Washington Place, Honolulu, Oʻahu aged 79

== Styles ==
Period	Style	Used by
1795–1852	Hawaiian: Aliʻi Nui; English: High Chief; Meaning: Originally meaning "Great Chief" of a single island (not the same as a European king)	Kamehameha I Kamehameha II Kamehameha III
1852–1887	Hawaiian: Aliʻi o ko Hawaiʻi Pae ʻĀina; English: Monarch of the Hawaiian Islands	Kamehameha III Kamehameha IV Kamehameha V Lunalilo; Kalākaua
1863–1887	Hawaiian: Ma ka Lokomaikaʻi o ke Akua, Ke Aliʻi o ko Hawaiʻi Pae ʻAina; English: By the grace of God, the Monarch of the Hawaiian Island	Kamehameha IV Kamehameha V Lunalilo Kalākaua Liliʻuokalani
1887–1891	Hawaiian: Ma ka Lokomaikaʻi o ke Akua, Mōʻī o ko Hawaiʻi Pae ʻĀina; English: By the grace of God, King of the Hawaiian Islands	Kalākaua
1891–1893; 1893–1895 (Disputed)	Hawaiian: Ma ka Lokomaikaʻi o ke Akua, Mōʻī Wahine o ko Hawaiʻi Pae ʻĀina; English: By the grace of God, Queen of the Hawaiian Islands	Liliʻuokalani

== See also ==
- House of Keoua
- House of Kawānanakoa
- List of governors of Hawaii

== Bibliography ==
- Alexander, William DeWitt (1891). "Appendix H: Sovereigns of the Hawaiian Islands". A Brief History of the Hawaiian People. New York: American Book Company. p. 331. OCLC 187412143.
- Cartwright, Bruce (1930). "Note on Hawaiian Genealogies". Thirty-eighth annual report of the Hawaiian Historical Society for the year 1929. Hawaiian Historical Society. pp. 45–47. hdl:10524/33.
- Kamakau, Samuel (1992) [1961]. Ruling Chiefs of Hawaii (Revised ed.). Honolulu: Kamehameha Schools Press. ISBN 0-87336-014-1. OCLC 25008795.
- Kuykendall, Ralph Simpson (1965) [1938]. The Hawaiian Kingdom 1778–1854, Foundation and Transformation. Vol. 1. Honolulu: University of Hawaii Press. ISBN 0-87022-431-X. OCLC 47008868.
- Kuykendall, Ralph Simpson (1953). The Hawaiian Kingdom 1854–1874, Twenty Critical Years. Vol. 2. Honolulu: University of Hawaii Press. ISBN 978-0-87022-432-4. OCLC 47010821.
- Kuykendall, Ralph Simpson (1967). The Hawaiian Kingdom 1874–1893, The Kalakaua Dynasty. Vol. 3. Honolulu: University of Hawaii Press. ISBN 978-0-87022-433-1. OCLC 500374815.
- Osorio, Jon Kamakawiwoʻole (2002). Dismembering Lāhui: A History of the Hawaiian Nation to 1887. Honolulu: University of Hawaii Press. ISBN 0-8248-2549-7. OCLC 48579247.
- Taylor, Albert Pierce (1922). Under Hawaiian Skies: A Narrative of the Romance, Adventure and History of the Hawaiian Islands. Honolulu: Advertiser Publishing Company, Ltd. p. 399. OCLC 479709.
