= Nahienaena =

Princess of the Kingdom of Hawaiʻi (1815–1836)

Nāhiʻenaʻena
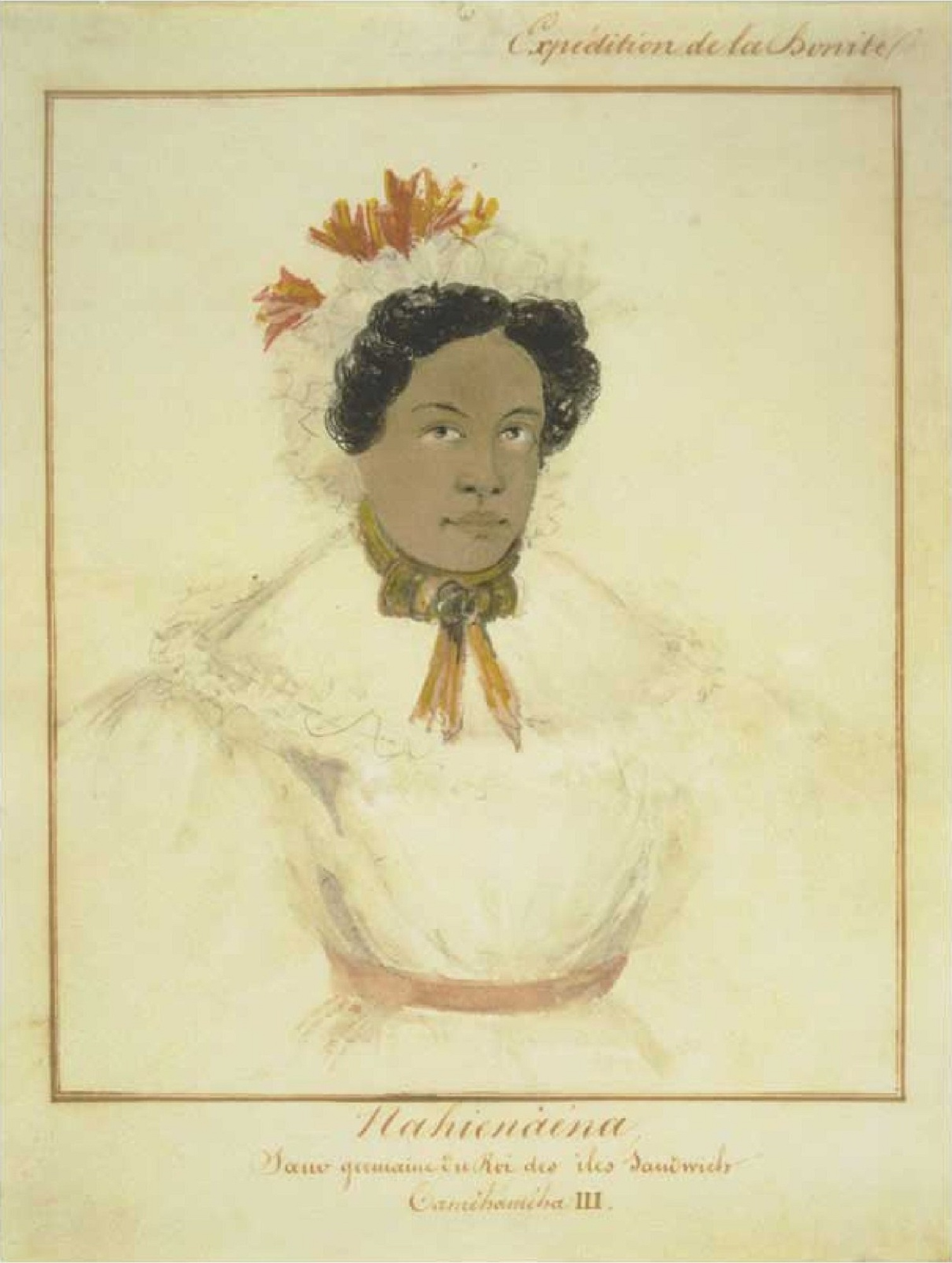
- Painting of Nāhiʻenaʻena by Barthélémy Lauvergne in 1836.
- Born: c. 1815; Keauhou Bay at South Kona, Hawaiʻi
- Died: January 5, 1837 (aged 21–22); Honolulu, Oahu
- Burial: Halekamani (until c. 1837); Mokuʻula (until c. 1884); Waiola Church
- Spouse: William Pitt Leleiohoku I
- Issue: Lot Kapuāiwa (hānai)
Names
- Harrieta Keōpūolani Nāhiʻenaʻena
- House: House of Kamehameha
- Father: Kamehameha I
- Mother: Queen Keōpūolani

Harriet or Harrieta Keōpūolani Nāhiʻenaʻena (c.1815– 5 January 1837) was a high-ranking princess during the founding of the Kingdom of Hawaii and the conversion of some of the ruling class to Christianity.

== Life ==
In the Hawaiian language nā ahi ʻena ʻena means "the red-hot raging fires".

nā ahi {ʻena ʻena}
the-PL fire {red-hot}
"the red-hot raging fires"

Nāhiʻenaʻena was born in 1815 at Keauhou Bay, South Kona, island of Hawaiʻi. Her parents were Kamehameha I and Keōpūolani, the Queen consort. She had two older brothers, hiapo (first born) Liholiho, and Kauikeaouli, who later became Kings Kamehameha II and III. Nāhiʻenaʻena was the sacred muli loa (last born) child, and was trained for the immense kuleana (privilege and responsibility) that would accompany someone of such high birth.

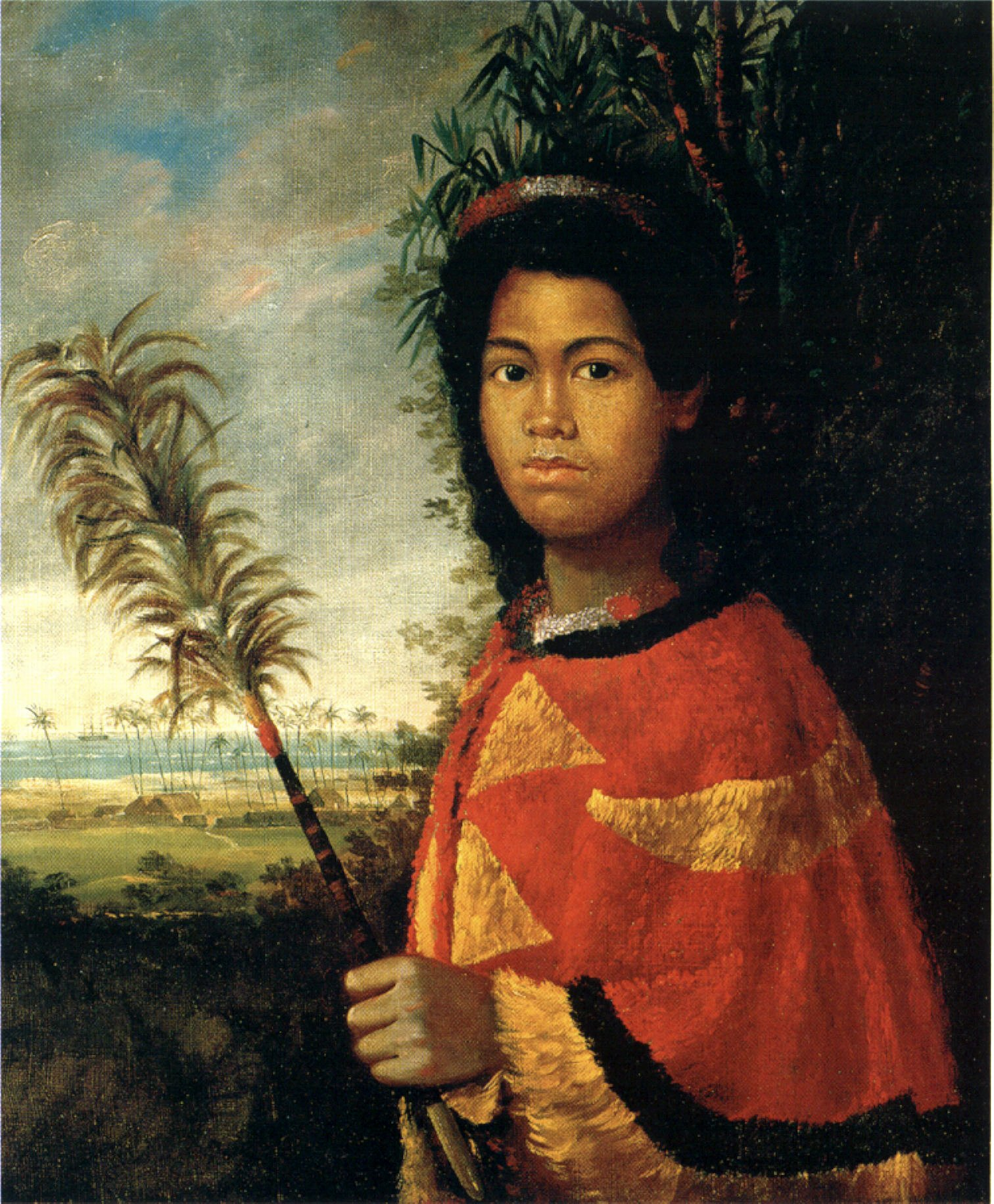
The young princess Nāhiʻenaʻena wearing her ʻahuʻula and holding a royal kāhili in 1825.

In 1825, the ship HMS Blonde returned with the bodies of King Kamehameha II and the Queen Kamāmalu, who had died on a trip to London. Ship's artist Robert Dampier painted a portrait of the ten-year-old princess, depicting her dressed in a red feather cloak despite her actually wearing a European style black dress.

Nāhiʻenaʻena was in love with her brother Kamehameha III and the chiefs strongly encouraged their marriage, but the missionaries were opposed to the union, calling it incest and therefore a sin. The practice of marriage between siblings in the royal family was considered a way of keeping the bloodlines pure in ancient Hawaii. Nāhiʻenaʻena's own maternal grandparents were half sister and brother.

The missionary culture at the time meant that many people, including Nāhiʻenaʻena, practiced both Hawaiian and Christian beliefs. She practiced cultural traditions such as hula, but also drank rum just as the missionaries did. However, she showed rebellion and distaste for many Christian tasks. She would interrupt church services and openly defy missionary teachings. Although she and many others were fragmented on beliefs, she never fully converted. On her death bed, missionary wives tried to urge her to repent for her sins.

She was eventually betrothed to William Pitt Leleiohoku I, the son of William Pitt Kalanimoku, Prime Minister of Hawaii. Kamehameha III tried to delay the wedding by insisting Leleiohoku be educated first. Leleiohoku and Nāhiʻenaʻena were married November 25, 1835, by William Richards at Waineʻe Church.

== Death ==
On September 17, 1836, Nāhiʻenaʻena gave birth to a child. Kamehameha III announced that the child would be the heir to the throne because he believed it to be his, but the child lived for only a few hours. Nāhiʻenaʻena never recovered physically or emotionally from the birth of her child. British physician Thomas Charles Byde Rooke, the husband of High Chiefess Grace Kamaʻikuʻi, examined her but was unable to determine the cause of the illness. He called upon Dr. Ruschenberger, a visiting surgeon, to assist him. Nāhiʻenaʻena died three and half months after giving birth, near Hale Uluhe, the home of her brother, Kamehameha III.

Although tradition holds that Nāhiʻenaʻena died on December 30, 1836, the actual date of her death is described in the notes of the visiting American naturalist John Kirk Townsend as having been January 5, 1837. Townsend wrote on January 3, 1837, that he met with the King and found him "suffering great distress of mind on account of the extreme illness of his favorite and only sister, the princess Harieta Nahienaena" and "While we were yet conversing with the king, a messenger came to say that she was worse, and desired to see him." A few days later, on January 6, 1837, he wrote "Yesterday the Princess Harieta died. Scarcely was the circumstance known in the town, when it was announced to all by the most terrific and distressing crying and wailing amongst all ranks and classes of people." Later that month, on January 27, 1837, Townsend paid his respects at the princess's casket and described the plaque upon it as saying "Harieta Nahienaena, aged 22 years, died on the 30th of December, in the year of our Lord, 1836" and then goes on to say "This appears like a contradiction. It is stated on the coffin plate, that the princess died on the 30th of December, when it did not actually occur until the 5th of January. This is accounted for, by the peculiar, and in some measure, reasonable doctrine of the Sandwich Islanders, that a person experiences two deaths; one of the mind, and another of the body. Now the mind of the princess died, i.e., became deranged, on the 30th of December, although her body did not die until the 5th of January."

After nearly five weeks of intense grieving, the princess's body was brought in procession to Kawaiahaʻo Church for funeral services. The procession was led by traditional warriors and kāhuna laʻau lapaʻau (healers). On April 12, 1837, her body was brought aboard the ship Don Qixote (purchased and renamed Kai Keōpūolani by her brother), to the resting place at the tomb on the premise of Halekamani in Lāhainā, Maui. She was interred next to her mother and Kaumualiʻi. Later their remains were transferred to a tomb on the island of Mokuʻula sometime in 1837 and eventually in 1884 to the cemetery of Waiola Church.

Her death had a sobering effect on her brother, King Kamehameha III.

== Ancestry ==
Ancestors of Nahienaena

16. Keaweʻīkekahialiʻiokamoku (= 23)
8. Keʻeaumoku Nui (= 28)
17. Kalanikauleleaiwi (= 21, 23)
4. Keōua Kalanikupuapaikalaninui (= 14)
18. Ku-a-Nuʻuanau
9. Kamakaʻimoku (= 29)
19. Umiula-a-Kaʻahumanu
2. Kamehameha I
20. Kauaua-a-Mahi
10. Haʻae-a-Mahi
21. Kalanikauleleaiwi (= 17,23)
5. Kekuʻiapoiwa II
22. Keaweʻīkekahialiʻiokamoku (= 16)
11. Kekelakekeokalani-a-Keawe
23. Kalanikauleleaiwi (= 17,21)
1. Nāhienaena
24. Kalaninuiamamao
12. Kalaniʻōpuʻu
25. Kamakaʻimoku
6. Kīwalaʻō
26. Kekaulike (= 30)
13. Kalola Pupuka-o-Honokawailani (= 15)
27. Kekuʻiapoiwa (= 31)
3. Keōpūolani
28. Keʻeaumoku Nui (= 8)
14. Keōua Kalanikupuapaikalaninui (= 4)
29. Kamakaʻimoku (= 9)
7. Kekuʻiapoiwa Liliha
30. Kekaulike (= 26)
15. Kalola Pupuka-o-Honokawailani (= 13)
31. Kekuʻiapoiwa (= 27)

== See also ==
- Nāhiʻenaʻena's Pāʻū
