= Nāhiʻenaʻena's pāʻū =

Largest known Hawaiian feather cloak

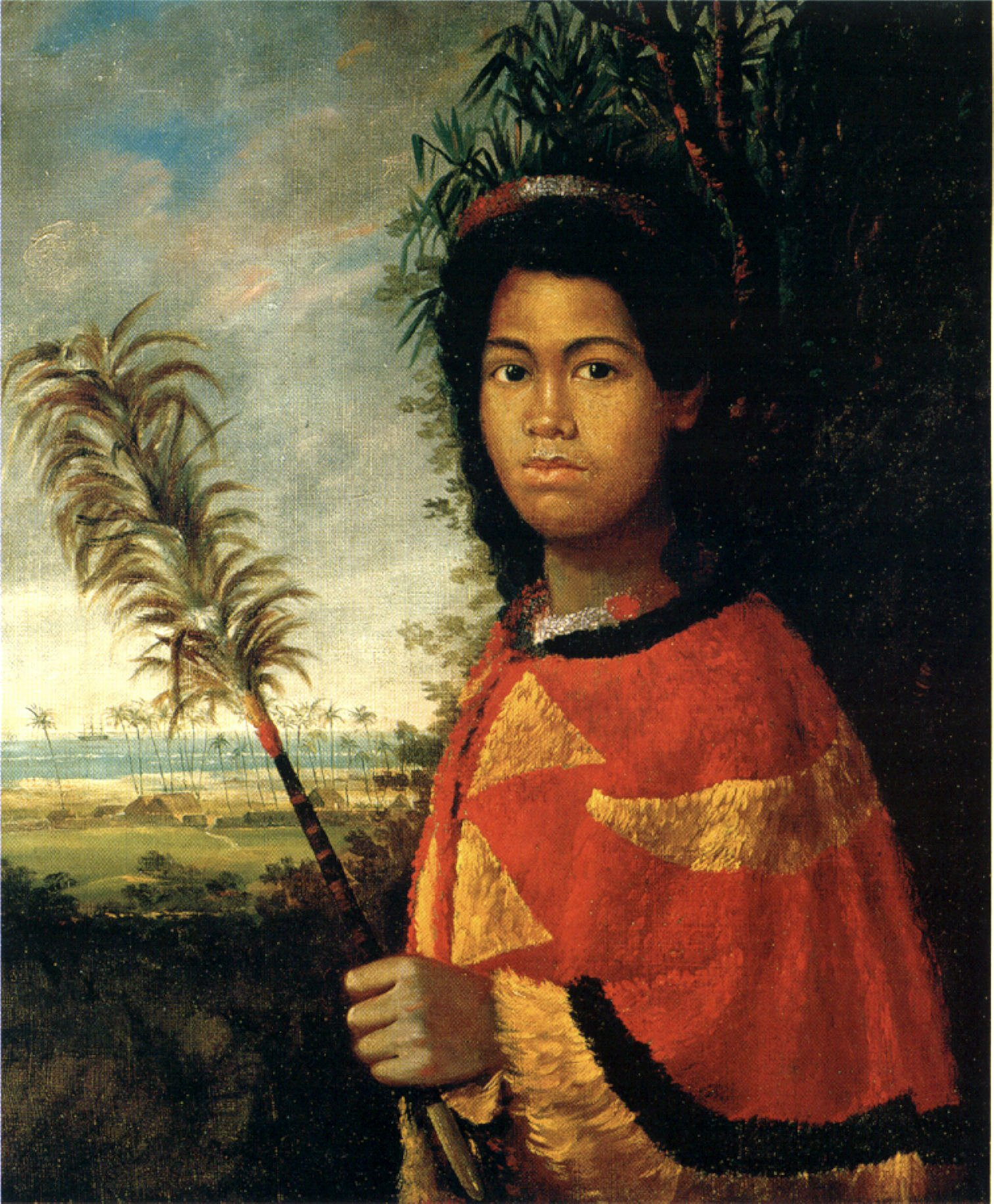
Princess Nāhiʻenaʻena in a feather cloak. The pāʻū is not pictured here.

Nāhiʻenaʻena's pāʻū is the largest known piece of Hawaiian feather work. It is a feather skirt (pāʻū) made for Princess Nāhiʻenaʻena.

It is kept by the Bishop Museum in Honolulu, but rarely displayed due to its age and fragility.

== Story ==
The pāʻū, or feather skirt, was made about 1824 for the Princess Nāhiʻenaʻena, the daughter of King Kamehameha I and Keōpūolani, a highborn chiefess considered the most "sacred" of Kamehameha's wives. Descended from aliʻi on Maui and the ruling chiefs of Hawaii island, Keōpūolani had a better family background than Kamehameha himself. Nāhiʻenaʻena and her brothers were of the highest rank and were seen as "the strength and purity of the Hawaiian people." This special ceremonial garment symbolizes that rank. The pāʻū was only worn once by the princess, apparently reluctantly. She was about 9 years old when the only engraving of her was drawn. The bodies of King Kamehameha II and Queen Kamāmalu had been brought back from Great Britain on HMS Blonde, and the first Christian memorial service was held for a Hawaiian King. She was conflicted with her religious beliefs; Keōpūolani and Queen Kaʻahumanu had converted to Christianity after the death of Kamehameha I and rejected the old Hawaiian religion, which the pāʻū represented. She would run away and hide when ceremonial occasions demanded she wear the pāʻū.

== Description ==
The garment was 20 ft × 2.5 ft (6.10 m × 0.76 m), which Nāhiʻenaʻena wore by wrapping it around her. It was cut in half and resewn after Nāhiʻenaʻena's death in 1836, and currently measures 10 ft × 5 ft (3.0 m × 1.5 m). The pāʻū is made mostly of yellow feathers from the now-extinct ʻōʻō and mamo birds. Both birds were mostly black but had patches of yellow under their wings and tail. A geometric pattern of alternating triangles of black ōʻō feathers and red-orange feathers of the now-endangered ʻiʻiwi bird lines the edge of the pāʻū. While these birds were widely collected by the Native Hawaiians for their feathers, it is more likely that their ultimate extinction was due to habitat loss and disease. The triangles are thought to represent shark teeth or mountains, which are both symbols of power, but it still remains a mystery. Small bundles of a half-dozen or fewer feathers, about an inch long, are tied into the eye using netting made from olonā vegetable fibers. There are an estimated 1 million feathers on the skirt, meaning that 200,000 birds were probably involved.

== Aftermath ==
After the death of Nāhiʻenaʻena, the pāʻū remained in the royal family and was kept at ʻIolani Palace. It was reconfigured and worn by dead Hawaiian royalty while lying in state. There is a single reference that it was used at the funeral of Kamehameha III in 1854, and photos show it under the coffin of King Kalākaua in 1891. The Bernice P. Bishop Museum stored it for more than 100 years in a secure temperature- and humidity-controlled room. Bishop Museum collections manager Betty Kam called it "a one-of-a-kind treasure".

The pāʻū was displayed for one day at the Bishop Museum's Polynesian Hall on June 11, 2003 which was Kamehameha Day, as a tribute to the princess and her father. The rare artifact was guarded by practitioners the Hawaiian martial art of lua in traditional garb. This was the first public showing of the pāʻū in 10 years, though it was displayed at a Bishop Museum fund-raiser in May 2003. It was also displayed in a 2006 exhibit.
