= Kamehameha II =

King of Hawaii from 1819 to 1824

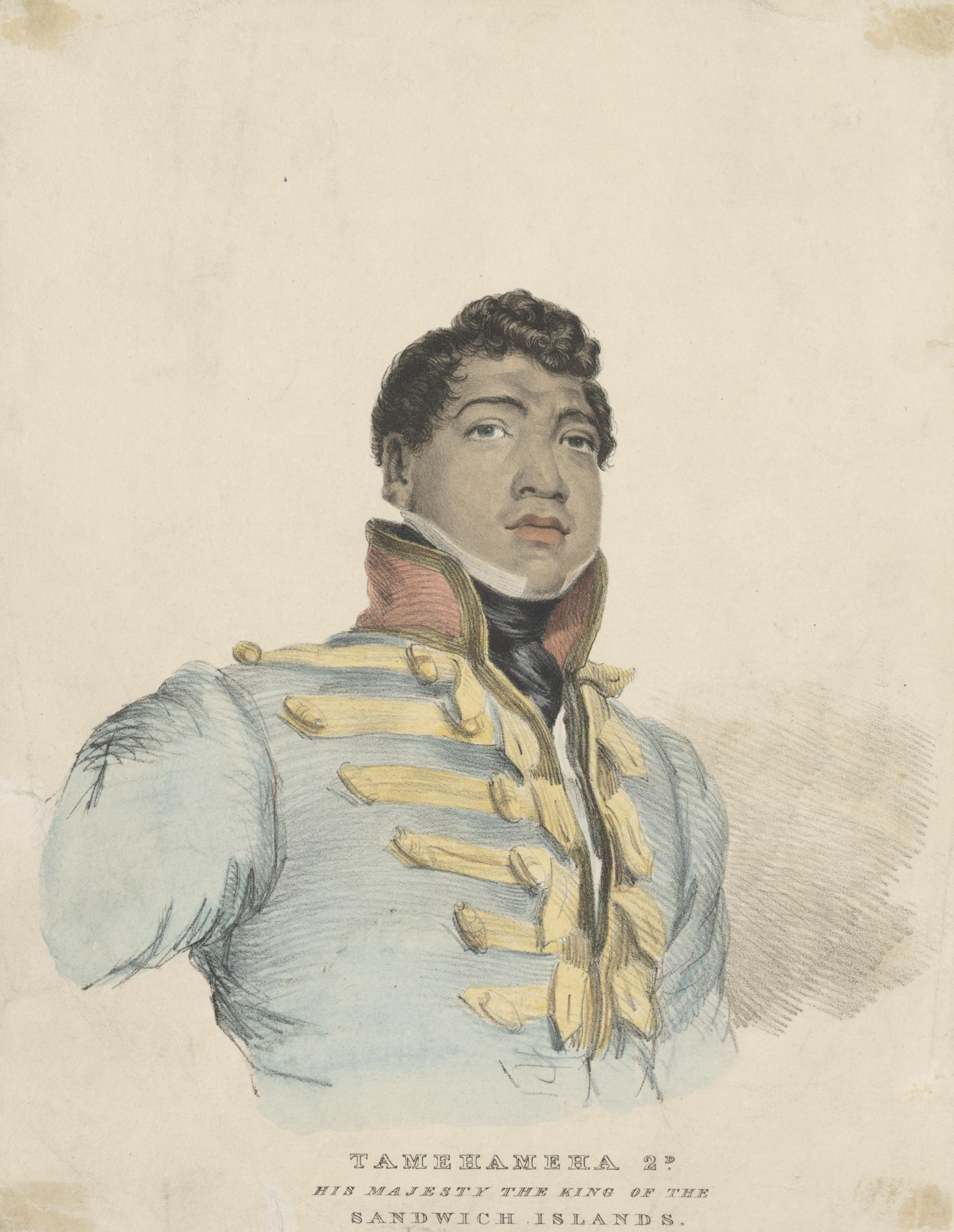
- Portrait of Kamehameha II, drawn by John Hayter, 1824.

King of the Hawaiian Islands
- Reign: May 20, 1819 – July 14, 1824
- Predecessor: Kamehameha I
- Successor: Kamehameha III
- Kuhina Nui: Kaʻahumanu I
- Born: Liholiho; November 1797; Hilo, Hawaiʻi
- Died: July 14, 1824 (aged 26); London, England
- Burial: May 11, 1825; Mauna ʻAla Royal Mausoleum
- Spouses: Kamāmalu; Kaʻahumanu II; Kaʻahumanu III; Pauahi; Kekauʻōnohi
Names
- Kalani Kaleiʻaimoku o Kaiwikapu o Laʻamea i Kauikawekiu Ahilapalapa Kealiʻi Kauinamoku o Kahekili Kalaninui i Mamao ʻIolani i Ka Liholiho
- House: House of Kamehameha
- Father: Kamehameha I
- Mother: Keōpūolani

Kamehameha II (November 1797 – July 14, 1824) was the second king of the Kingdom of Hawaii from 1819 until his death in 1824. His birth name was Liholiho and full name was Kalaninui kua Liholiho i ke kapu ʻIolani. It was lengthened to Kalani Kaleiʻaimoku o Kaiwikapu o Laʻamea i Kauikawekiu Ahilapalapa Kealiʻi Kauinamoku o Kahekili Kalaninui i Mamao ʻIolani i Ka Liholiho when he took the throne.

Due to his young age, his power was limited and he was controlled under Ka'ahumanu, the queen consort of his father Kamehameha I. However, Kamehameha II is known for the 'Ai Noa, when he broke traditional religious laws, leading to a lengthened period of taboo-breaking, the disbanding of the social class of priest, and the destruction of temples and images. With increased European contact, Christianity and Western influence began to appear during his reign.

== Early life ==
Kamehameha II was born in the month of Hanaiaʻeleʻele (corresponding to November) 1797 in Hilo, on the island of Hawaiʻi, the first born son of Kamehameha I with one of his high ranking wife Keōpuolani. It was originally planned that he would be born at the Kūkaniloko birth site on the island of Oʻahu but the Queen's sickness prevented travel.

Given in care to his father's trusted servant Hanapi, who took the child to the lands of Kalaoa in Hilo Paliku, he was taken back, after five or six months, by his maternal grandmother Kekuʻiapoiwa Liliha because she felt he was not getting the right diet. Kamehameha I, then, put him in the care of Queen Kaʻahumanu (another wife of Kamehameha I), who was appointed as Liholiho's official guardian.

Jean Baptiste Rives, a Frenchman about his age, arrived on the islands in the early 19th century. Rives taught the royal princes with French language, becoming a close friend (ʻaikāne). Other companions included Charles Kanaʻina, Kekūanaōʻa, and Laʻanui.

He was named Kalaninui kua Liholiho i ke kapu ʻIolani. Liholiho (meaning glowing), a contraction of Kalaninuiliholiho or Kalaninui kua Liholiho i ke kapu meant "the great chief with the burning back kapu". ʻIolani meant "royal hawk" after the Hawaiian hawk (ʻio) whose high flight signified royalty.

== Ascension ==
Liholiho officially inherited the throne upon Kamehameha I's death in May 1819. However, Queen Kaʻahumanu had no intention to give him actual leadership. When Liholiho sailed toward the shores of Kailua-Kona (the capital at the time), she greeted him wearing Kamehameha's royal red cape, and she announced to the people on shore and to the surprised Liholiho, "We two shall rule the land." Liholiho, young and inexperienced, had no other choice. Kaʻahumanu became the first Kuhina Nui (co-regent) of Hawaii. He was forced to take on merely a ceremonial role; administrative power was to be vested in Kaʻahumanu. He took the title "King Kamehameha II", but preferred to be called ʻIolani, which means "heavenly (or royal) hawk".

== Reign ==
Kamehameha II is best remembered for the 'Ai Noa, the breaking of the ancient kapu (taboo) system of religious laws six months into his reign when he sat down with Kaʻahumanu and his mother Keopuolani and ate a meal together. The strict rules of the Hawaiian religion were no longer followed, leading to the traditional culture.

Kamehameha I had bequeathed his war god Kūkaʻilimoku and his temples to his cousin Kekuaokalani. Kekuaokalani demanded that Liholiho withdraw his edicts against the Hawaiian priesthood, permit rebuilding of the temples, and dismiss both Kalanimōkū and Kaʻahumanu. Kamehameha II refused. At the Battle of Kuamoʻo on the island of Hawaiʻi, the king's better-armed forces, led by Kalanimōkū, defeated the last defenders of the Hawaiian gods, temples, and priesthoods of the ancient organized religion. The first Christian missionaries arrived only a few months later in the Hawaiian Islands.

He never officially converted to Christianity because he refused to give up four of his five wives and his love of alcohol. He (like his father) married several relatives of high rank, but he was the last Hawaiian king to practice polygamy. His favorite wife was his sister Kamāmalu. Kīnaʻu (Kamāmalu's full-blood sister) was his second wife who would later remarry and become Kuhina Nui. Princess Kalani Pauahi was his niece by his half-brother Pauli Kaōleiokū. She later remarried and gave birth to Princess Ruth Keʻelikōlani. Kekāuluohi was half-sister of Kamāmalu and Kīnaʻu through their mother Kaheiheimālie who was another of his father's wives. Princess Kekauʻōnohi was Liholiho's niece and granddaughter of Kamehameha I, and would later become royal governor of the islands of Maui and Kauaʻi.

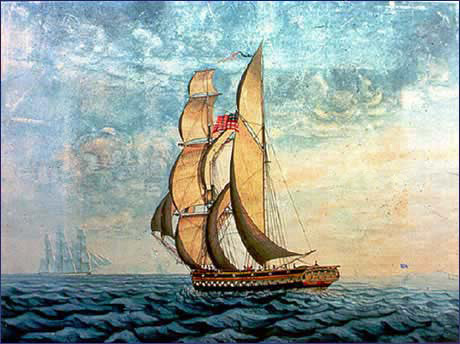
The royal yacht Haʻaheo o Hawaiʻi

He was known to be impulsive. For example, on November 16, 1820, he bought a Royal Yacht known as Cleopatra's Barge for 8,000 piculs of sandalwood (over a million pounds), estimated to be worth about US$80,000 at the time. It had been sold a few years before for $15,400 by the Crowninshield family of Salem, Massachusetts. Kamehameha II was quite proud of his ship; in the words of Charles Bullard, the agent for the shipowner:

If you want to know how Religion stands at the Islands I can tell you — All sects are tolerated but the King worships the Barge.

He tried to gain favor with missionaries by offering free passage on the opulent ship, and regularly entertained foreign visitors with their choice of alcoholic beverages. On April 18, 1822, it required a major overhaul because most of the wood had rotted. He paid to have wood shipped in from the Pacific Northwest for repairs, and then renamed his ship Haʻaheo o Hawaiʻi ("Pride of Hawaii"). After re-launching on May 10, 1823, it was wrecked less than a year later.

In the summer of 1821, he was in a small boat intended for the ʻEwa beach, just west of Honolulu. A few nobles such as Chiefess Kapiʻolani and Governor Boki were aboard, with about 30 men. He ordered the ship to instead cross a dangerous channel all the way to the island of Kauaʻi, despite having no compass, charts, nor provisions on board. They somehow made it to Kauaʻi. When they arrived, the local Chief Kaumualiʻi did not fire his cannons on the unarmed ship but welcomed the young king. The Royal Yacht was sent for, and the royal party entertained themselves for over a month. Then one night after he invited Kaumualiʻi on board, Kamehameha II abruptly ordered the yacht to sail in the night. Upon returning to Honolulu, he had Kaumualiʻi "marry" Kaʻahumanu and kept him under house arrest in exile until his death.

== Fatal visit to Great Britain ==
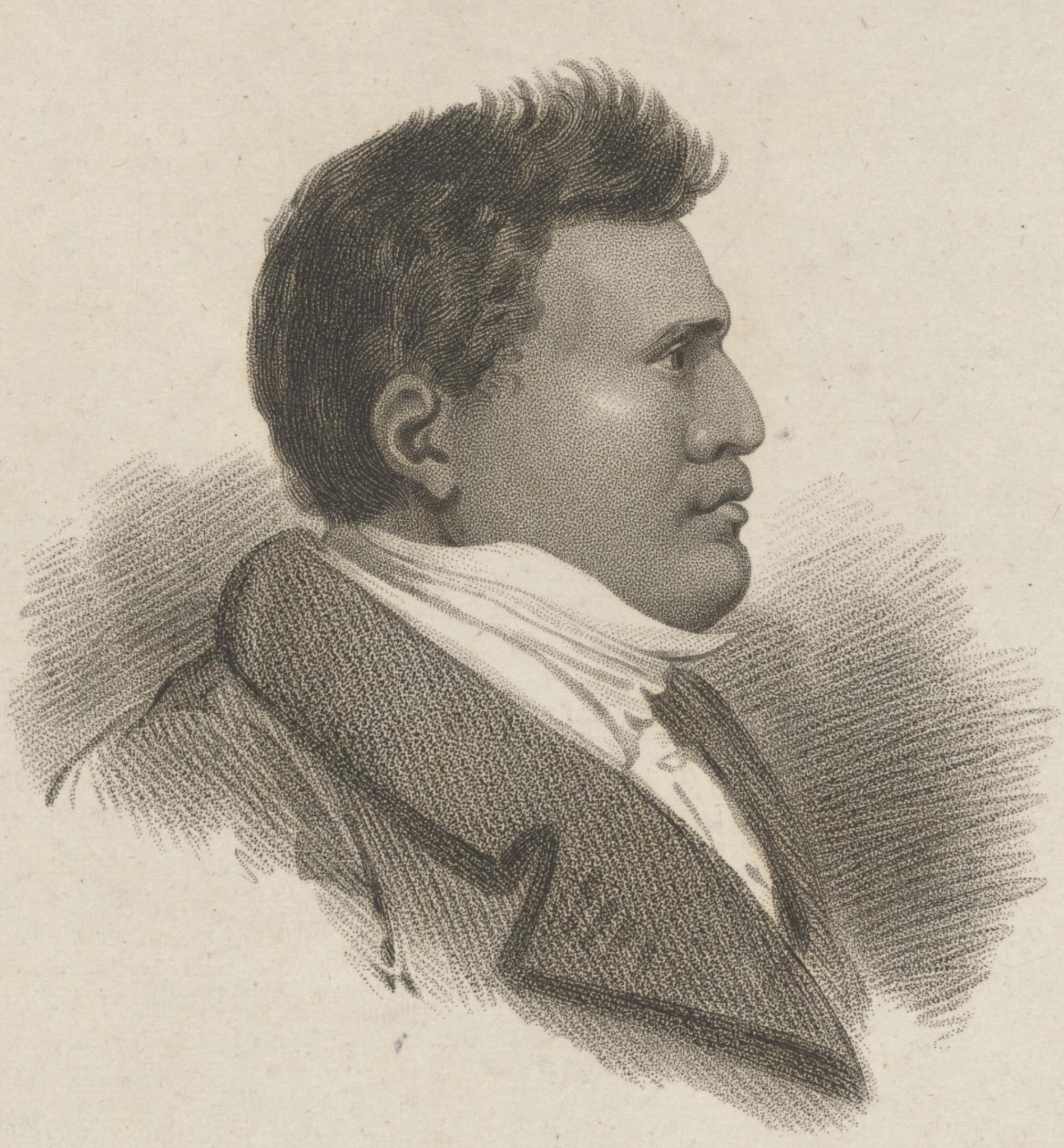
Sketch in London just before his death

Another of his voyages would prove fatal. On April 16, 1822 English missionary William Ellis arrived with a schooner Prince Regent of six guns to add to his growing collection of ships. It was a gift from George IV the King of Great Britain, and Kamehameha II wrote to thank him, requesting closer diplomatic ties. He wanted to travel to London, but all his advisors including Keōpūolani and Kaʻahumanu were opposed to the idea. After his mother Keōpūolani's death on September 16, 1823, he made up his mind to go.

In November 1823, Kamehameha II and Queen Kamāmalu commissioned the British whaling ship L'Aigle (French for "the Eagle") under Captain Valentine Starbuck to carry them to London. Going along were High Chief Boki and wife High Chiefess Kuini Liliha, and other chiefs and retainers including Manuia, Naihekukui, James Young Kānehoa, Kekūanaōʻa, Kauluhaimalama, Naʻaiweuweu, and Naukane who had already been to America (where he picked up the name John Coxe) and then England.

Since Ellis wanted to travel back to England anyway, he offered to be translator and guide, but Starbuck refused. Somehow Rives talked his way on board instead as translator.

In February 1824, they arrived at Rio de Janeiro in the newly independent Empire of Brazil. Emperor Pedro I received the visitors, presenting Kamehameha II with a ceremonial diamond-encrusted sword with a gold sheath, and in return accepting an ʻahu ʻula, a traditional feather cloak associated with high rank, which was lost in the 2018 fire at the National Museum of Brazil. Queen Kamāmalu received a diamond ring; in return, she offered a yellow feather necklace.

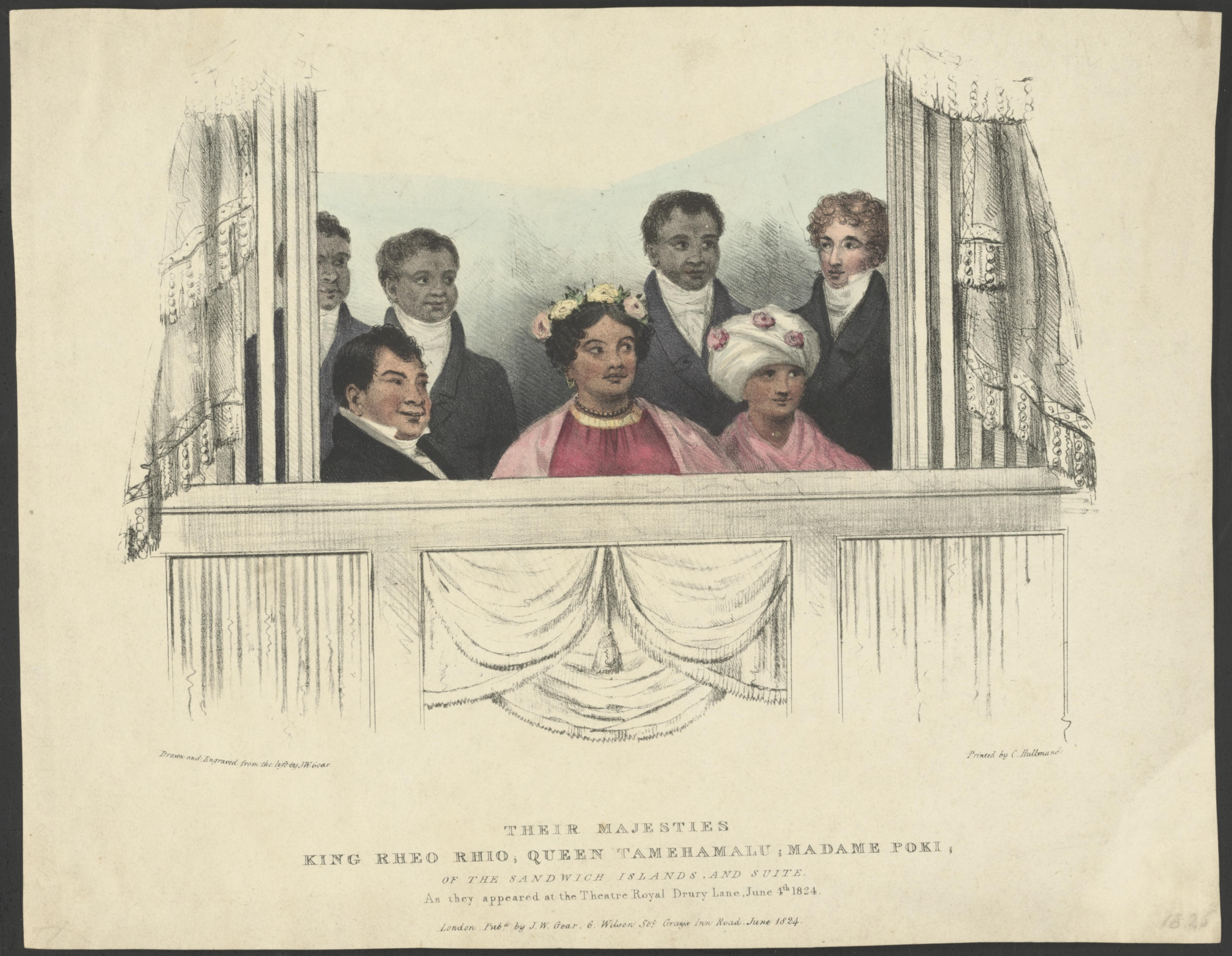
In the royal box at London, 1824

They arrived on May 17, 1824 in Portsmouth, and the next day moved into the Caledonian Hotel in London. Foreign Secretary George Canning appointed Frederick Gerald Byng (1784–1871) to supervise their visit. Byng was a Gentleman Usher, fifth son of John Byng, 5th Viscount Torrington and friend of Beau Brummell, known more for his gaudy fashions than diplomacy. Byng made sure they would have appropriate attire for all their public appearances.

Their arrival was met by the local press with a mixture of curiosity and derision. They were not sure what to call the king, spelling his "Liholiho" name various ways such as "Rheo Rhio". Some made puns on the fact that Byng's nickname was "Poodle" and in Hawaiian ʻīlio ʻīlio would mean "dog of dogs" and that the British name of the kingdom was "Sandwich Islands".

On May 28, a reception with 200 guests including several dukes was held in their honor. They toured London, visiting Westminster Abbey, but the king refused to enter because he did not want to desecrate the British royal burial place "with his presence or his feet stepping in that area." They attended opera and ballet at Royal Opera House in Covent Garden on May 31, and the Theatre Royal in Drury Lane on June 4 in the Royal Box. He and Kamāmalu were an unusual sight to the British people who had seen few Native Hawaiians, moreover, Kamāmalu was over six-feet tall. Several members of the court had portraits painted by the Hayter family.

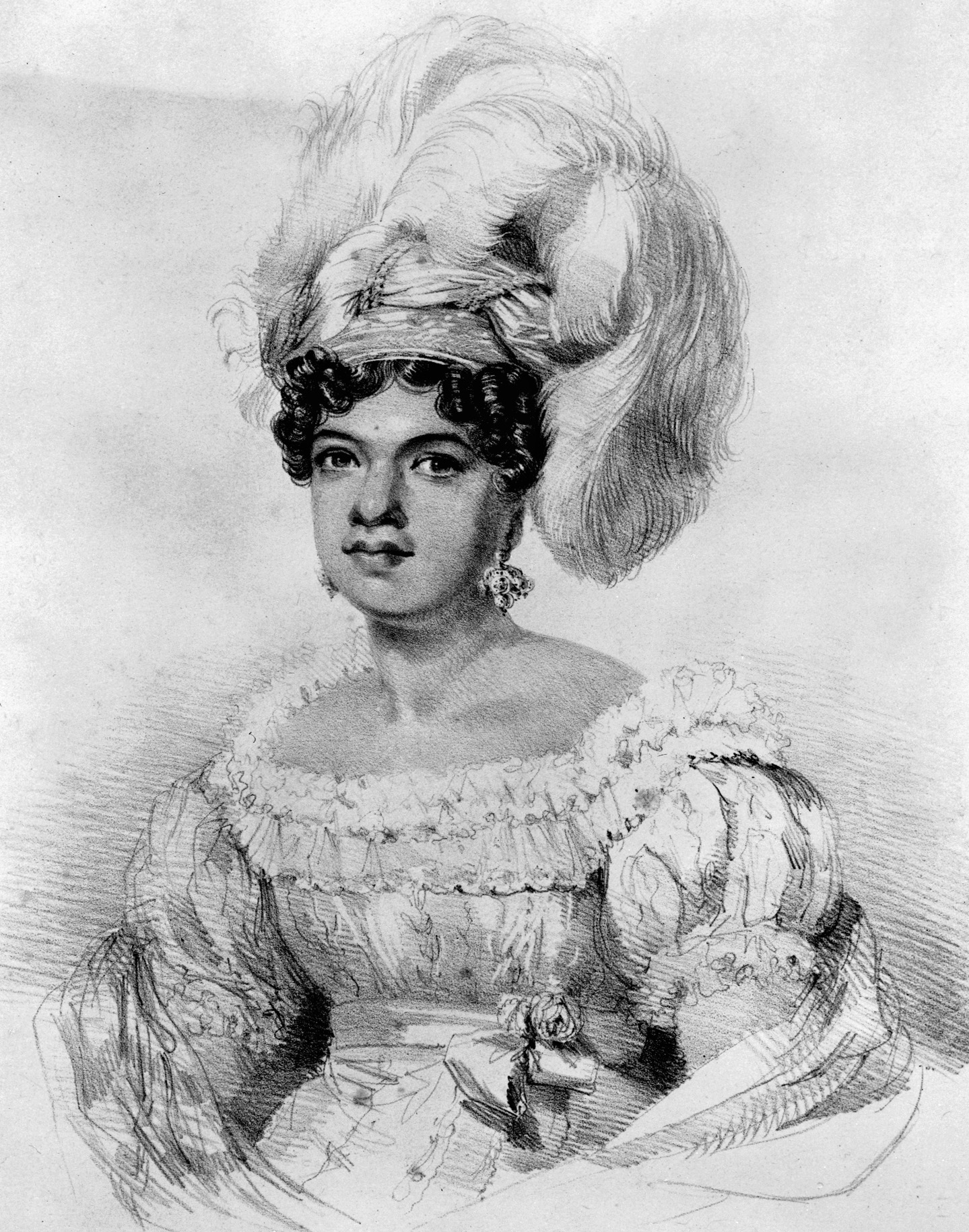
Queen consort Kamāmalu at London

King George IV finally scheduled a meeting for June 21, but it had to be delayed as Kamāmalu became ill. The Hawaiian court had caught measles, to which they had no immunity. They probably contracted the disease on their June 5 visit to the Royal Military Asylum (now the Duke of York's Royal Military School). Kamāmalu died on July 8, 1824. The grief-stricken Kamehameha II died six days later on July 14, 1824.

Vast crowds lined up when he was laid in state at the Caledonian Hotel on July 17. On July 18, the bodies were stored in the crypt of St Martin-in-the-Fields church where they awaited transportation back home. Boki took over lead of the delegation and finally did have an audience with King George IV. Kānehoa (James Young), with superior English language skills conferred by his English father John Young, was entrusted with the official letters of introduction and served as new translator. Rives and Starbuck were accused of misspending the royal treasury and departed.

In August 1824, the bodies returned to Hawaii on the enormous Royal Navy frigate HMS Blonde under the command of Captain George Anson Byron.

The Blonde arrived back in Honolulu on May 6, 1825. Kalanimōkū had been notified of the deaths in a letter from Rives, so Hawaiian royalty gathered at his house where the bodies were moved for the funeral. The marines and crew from the ship made a formal procession, the ship's chaplain read an Anglican prayer, and an American missionary was allowed to make a prayer in the Hawaiian language. They were buried on the grounds of the ʻIolani Palace in a coral house meant to be the Hawaiian version of the tombs Liholiho had seen in London. They were eventually moved to the Royal Mausoleum of Hawaii known as Mauna ʻAla. Kamehameha II was succeeded by his younger brother Kauikeaouli, who became King Kamehameha III.

== Family tree ==
Kamehameha family tree

Kalaniʻōpuʻu (k)	Kalola (w)	Keōua (k)	Kekuʻiapoiwa II (w)	Kānekapōlei (w)
Kīwalaʻō	Kekuiapoiwa Liliha
Keōpūolani	Kamehameha I (The Great) (died 1819)	Kalākua Kaheiheimālie	Kaʻahumanu (1819–1832)
Liholiho; Kamehameha II (1819–1824)	Kamāmalu	Keouawahine	Pauli Kaʻōleiokū _{*Paternity is in question as daughter and mother both claim Kalaniopuu as the father.}	Kahailiopua; Luahine
Kauikeaouli; Kamehameha III (1825–1854)	Kalama	Elizabeth Kīnaʻu; Kaʻahumanu II	Mataio; Kekūanaōʻa	Pauahi	Laura Kōnia	Abner Pākī
Keaweaweʻulaokalani I	Keaweaweʻulaokalani II
Queen Emma	Alexander Liholiho; Kamehameha IV (1854–1863)	Lot Kapuāiwa; Kamehameha V (1863–1872)	Victoria Kamāmalu; Kaʻahumanu IV (1855–1863)	Ruth Keʻelikōlani	Charles Reed; Bishop	Bernice Pauahi; Bishop
Albert Kamehameha	John William Pitt Kīnaʻu	Keolaokalani Davis

=== Ancestry ===
Ancestors of Kamehameha II

8. Keʻeaumoku Nui
4. Keōua Kalanikupuapaikalaninui (= 14)
9. Kamakaʻimoku
2. Kamehameha I
10. Haʻae-a-Mahi
5. Kekuʻiapoiwa II
11. Kekelakekeokalani-a-Keawe
1. Kamehameha II
12. Kalaniʻōpuʻu
6. Kīwalaʻō
13. Kalola Pupuka-o-Honokawailani (= 15)
3. Keōpūolani
14. Keōua Kalanikupuapaikalaninui (= 4)
7. Kekuʻiapoiwa Liliha
15. Kalola Pupuka-o-Honokawailani (= 13)

Hawaiian royalty
Preceded by Kamehameha I	King of Hawaiʻi; 1819–1824	Succeeded by Kamehameha III
