= Kekūʻiapoiwa I =

Hawaiian chiefess

- Spouse: Kekaulike; Kauakahiakua
- Issue: Kamehamehanui Aiʻluau; Kahekili II; Kalola Pupuka-o-Honokawailani; Kekelaokalani
- Father: Kaulahea II
- Mother: Kalanikauleleiaiwi

Kekūʻiapoiwa I was a chiefess of the island of Hawaiʻi and Maui. She was also known as Kekūʻiapoiwa Nui ("Kekūʻiapoiwa the Great"). Her full name was Kekūʻiapoiwa-nui Kalani-kauhihiwakama Wanakapu.

== Biography ==
Kekūʻiapoiwa was born as a daughter of the High Chiefess Kalanikauleleiaiwi, who lived in the late 18th century and early 19th century. She was thus a niece of the king Keaweʻīkekahialiʻiokamoku and granddaughter of the queen Keakealaniwahine.

Her father was the king Kaulahea II of Maui. She remained on Maui and married her half-brother Kekaulike, founding the Kekaulike Dynasty of Maui which produced many chief politicians and nobles in the early days of the Kingdom of Hawaii.

She was also a sister of Alapainui and Haʻae and aunt of Kekuiapoiwa II, mother of the great king Kamehameha I.

She was a mother of Kamehamehanui Aiʻluau, and Kahekili II and grandmother of Kalanikūpule, the last of the longest line of ʻAliʻi Aimoku in the Hawaiian Islands. There is a theory that Kahekili was a biological father of Kamehameha I. Her daughter by Kekaulike was Kalola who married Kalaniʻōpuʻu and his half-brother Keōua and had Kīwalaʻō and Kekuiapoiwa Liliha respectively. Kekuiapoiwa had another daughter by the name of Kekelaokalani by Kauakahiakua, a distant cousin of her first husband, and Kekelaokalani was the mother of Kamehameha I's wife Peleuli.
