= Kekūʻiapoiwa Liliha =

- Queen of the Island of Hawaiʻi
- Spouses: Kīwalaʻō
- Issue: Keōpūolani
- Father: Keōua
- Mother: Kalola Pupuka-o-Honokawailani

Kekūʻiapoiwa Liliha (died 1815) was a queen of the island of Hawaiʻi.

== Biography ==
She was a daughter of the High Chief Keōua and Kalola Pupuka-o-Honokawailani. She was a granddaughter of Keʻeaumoku Nui, Kamakaimoku, queen Kekūʻiapoiwa I and king Kekaulike.

Her siblings were Kalokuokamaile, great king Kamehameha I and Keliimaikai, Kalaimamahu, whom she later married and had two children, daughterKilioa and Son Keaniani whom the Kalaimamahu line was continued through. She was an aunt of Kamehameha II, Kamehameha III and chiefess Kaohelelani.

She was also a half-sister of the king Kīwalaʻō. She married him and their daughter was Queen Keōpūolani, mother of Kamehameha II.

Kīwalaʻō was killed by the chief Keʻeaumoku Pāpaʻiahiahi.

She died in 1815 at Kapaʻakea close to Kaʻaluʻalu at Kiolakaʻa, Kaʻu.
