= Kahekili II =

Hawaiian chief (d. 1794)

Kahekilinuiʻahumanu
- Born: c. 1737
- Died: July 1794; Ulukou, Waikīkī
- Spouse: Kauwahine; Luahiwa
- Issue: Kalanikūpule; Koalaukani; Kalilikauoha; Kaloa; Kahekilinuiahunu Manonokauakapekulani; Kamehameha I
- Father: Kekaulike
- Mother: Kekuiapoiwa I

Kahekili II, full name Kahekilinuiʻahumanu, (c. 1737–1794) was an aliʻi (mōʻī) of Maui. His name was an abbreviation of Kanehekili, the god of thunder. Because Kanehekili was believed to be black on one side, Kahekili tattooed one side of his body from head to foot. He was called Titeeree, King of Mowee by European explorers.

== Family ==
He was born about 1710–1737 in Hāliʻimaile on the island of Maui. His father was Kekaulike Kalani-nui-Kui-Hono-i-Kamoku the 23rd Moʻi of Maui. His mother was Kekuaipoiwa-nui Kalani-kauhihiwakama Wanakapu (Kekuiapoiwa I, half-sister of Kekaulike). He had at least two wives, and three or four sons and two daughters.

His sister was Kalola.

There is a theory that he was the biological father of Kamehameha I.

== Battles ==
Preceded by Kamehamehanui ʻAilūʻau	Aliʻi nui of Maui; 1765 – August 27, 1791	Succeeded by Kaeokulani
Preceded by Kahahana	Aliʻi nui of Oʻahu; 1783–1793	Succeeded by Kalanikūpule
