= Kūkaniloko Birth Site =

- U.S. National Register of Historic Places
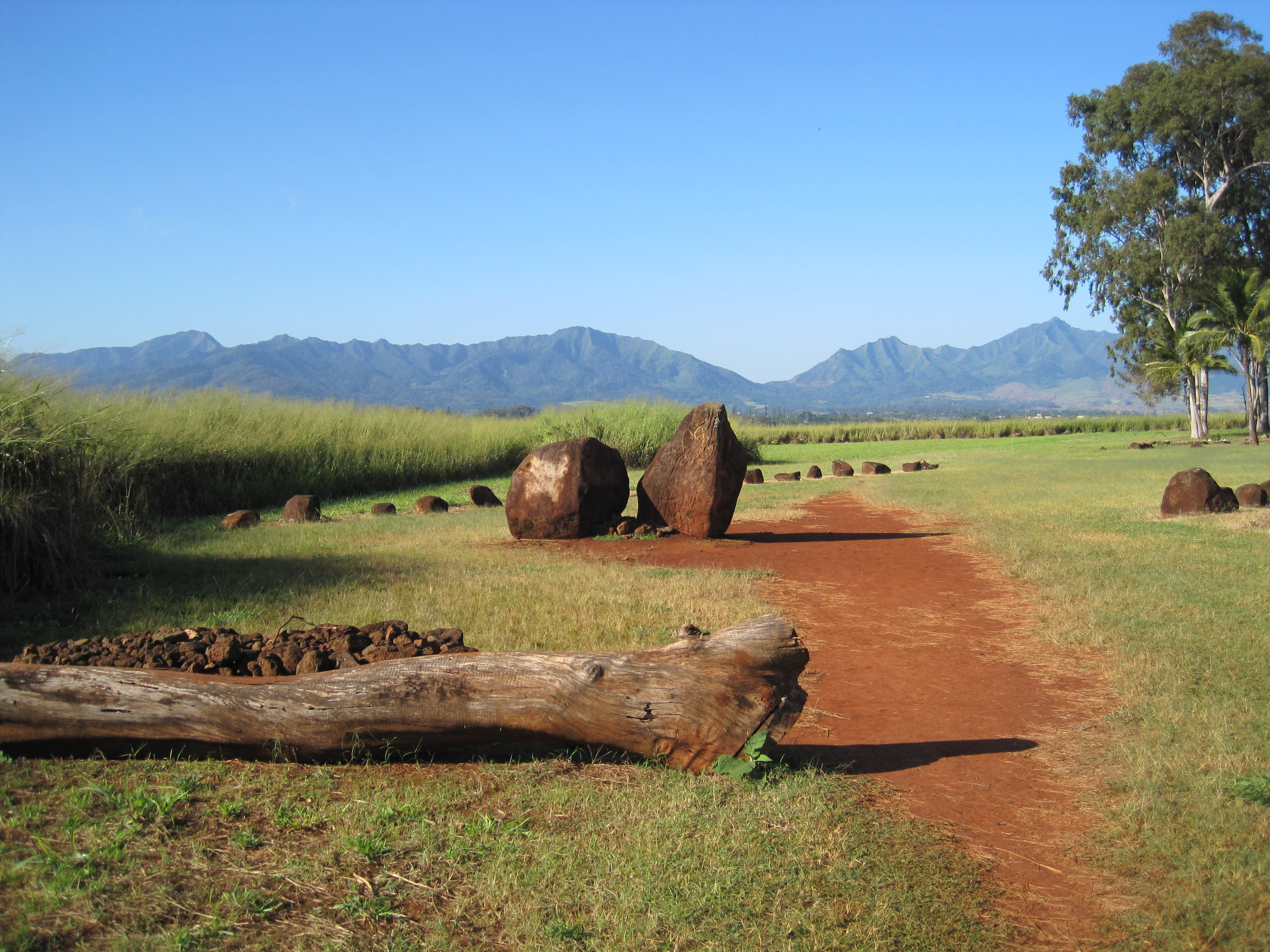
- View from park entrance toward Kolekole Pass

- Location within Hawaii
- Nearest city: Wahiawa, Hawaii
- Coordinates: 21°30′17″N 158°2′11″W
- Area: 5 acres (2.0 hectares)
- Built: prior to the 13th century
- Architectural style: Ancient Hawaiian
- NRHP reference No.: 73000674 and 94001640
- Added to NRHP: April 11, 1973 (original) and February 09, 1995 (increase)

Kūkaniloko Birth Site, also known as the Kūkaniloko Birthstones State Monument, is one of the most important ancient cultural sites on the island of Oʻahu. In 1973, it was first listed on the National Register of Historic Places and its boundaries were increased in 1995, after 5 acres (2.0 ha) of land which included the site became a state park in 1992. The site was the location for some of Hawaiʻi's royal births, and may have served an astronomical function.

== Geography ==
Kūkaniloko lies in the Wahiawā Plateau between Oʻahu's two mountain ranges: the Waiʻanae to leeward, and the Koʻolau to windward. It also lies at the intersection of two major paths of foot travel: the Waialua Trail between the North Shore and ʻEwa Beach, and the Kolekole Trail through the Waiʻanae Range.

The site is not only the place from which the history and power of the island was birthed, known as a piko, but its placement across from the Waiʻanae Range may have been used as a calendar. The sun has used by observing its position at Kūkaniloko using certain markers.

The present day location is near the intersection of Kamehameha Highway and Whitmore Avenue, just north of Wahiawā, Hawaiʻi.

== History ==
Kūkaniloko, meaning "to anchor the cry from within," is the geographic piko of Oʻahu. Kūkaniloko was symbolically the most powerful birth site for the island's high chiefs, among whom Kakuhihewa and Maʻilikūkahi were perhaps most famous. At this site, women gave birth to aliʻi children, surrounded by ali'i witnesses. At the Kūkaniloko birthstone, children born were required to learn the traditions and leaderships of their ancestors in the sites and surroundings.

The Hoʻolonopahu Heiau associated with the site was later destroyed, as were many others in the area, to make room for sugarcane and pineapple fields in the rich soils where sweet potato and yam once grew in abundance. Chiefly families lived along the slopes of the Waiʻanae overlooking the plateau and along the shores of Waialua to the north, and many key battles between rivals for control of Oʻahu were also fought on the central plains surrounding Kūkaniloko.

In 1925, a group called the Daughters of Hawaii recognized and protected the Kūkaniloko Birthstones site. In 1960, Kūkaniloko was passed to Hawaiian Civic Club of Wahiawā.

In August 2023, the site was threatened by a nearby wildfire.

== Births at the site ==
From as early as 1100 until the mid-1600s, fathers and 35 other chiefs would witness the birth of a chief at Kūkaniloko, which was announced by the playing of sacred drums. These 36 witnesses are symbolized by 36 stones in the complex. The newborn chief would then be taken to a nearby temple for purification, severing of the umbilical cord, and a reading of the newborn's genealogy.

== Astronomical use ==
The wide view of the skies from Kūkaniloko might also have made it akin to a Hawaiian Stonehenge. In April 2000, a team from the University of Hawaiʻi Institute for Astronomy recorded designs and shapes on the stones that could have been used to track the movements of celestial objects for calendrical purposes.

== Gallery ==
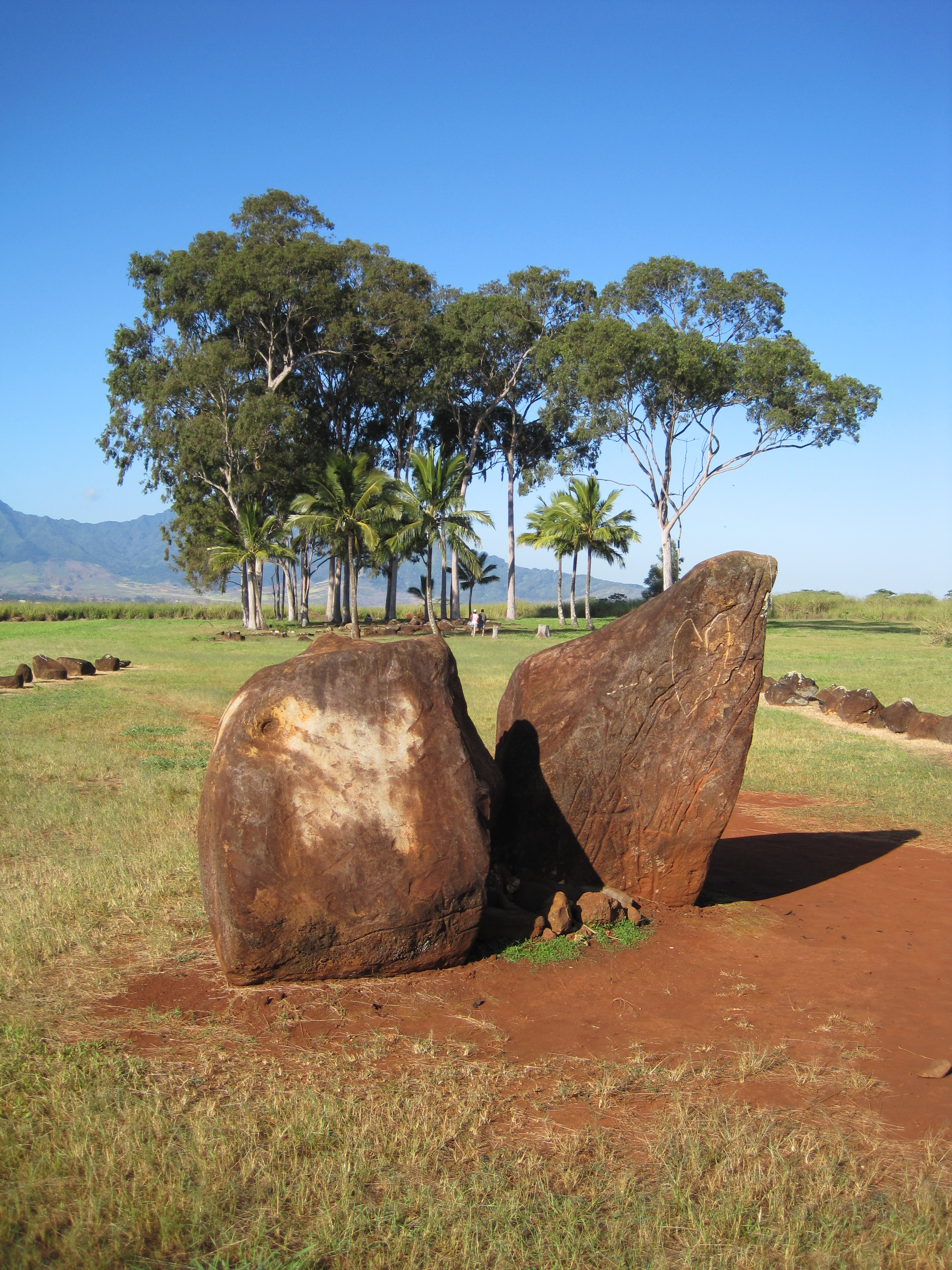
View from entrance stones to central stones

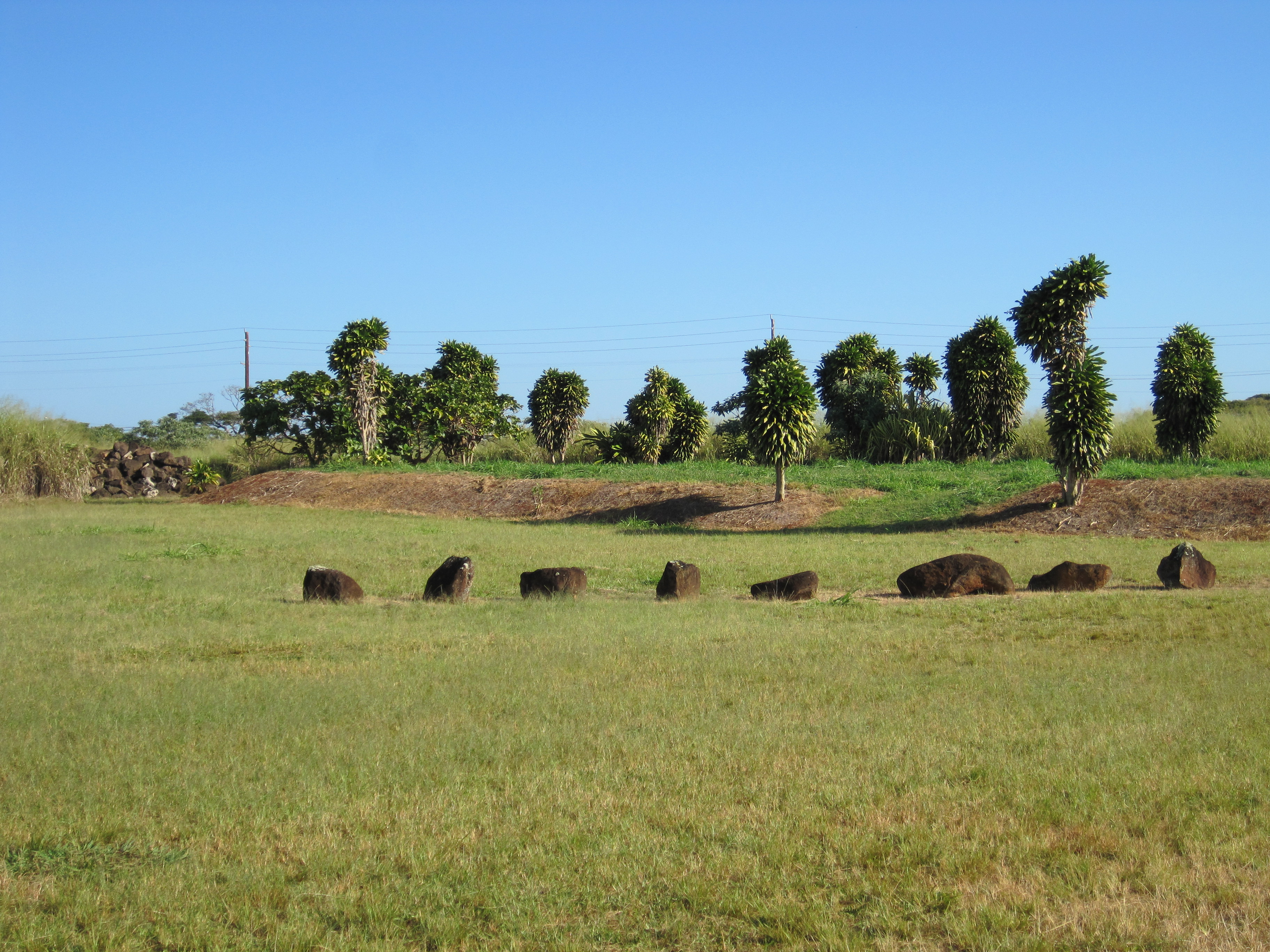
Kī plants on raised earth platform

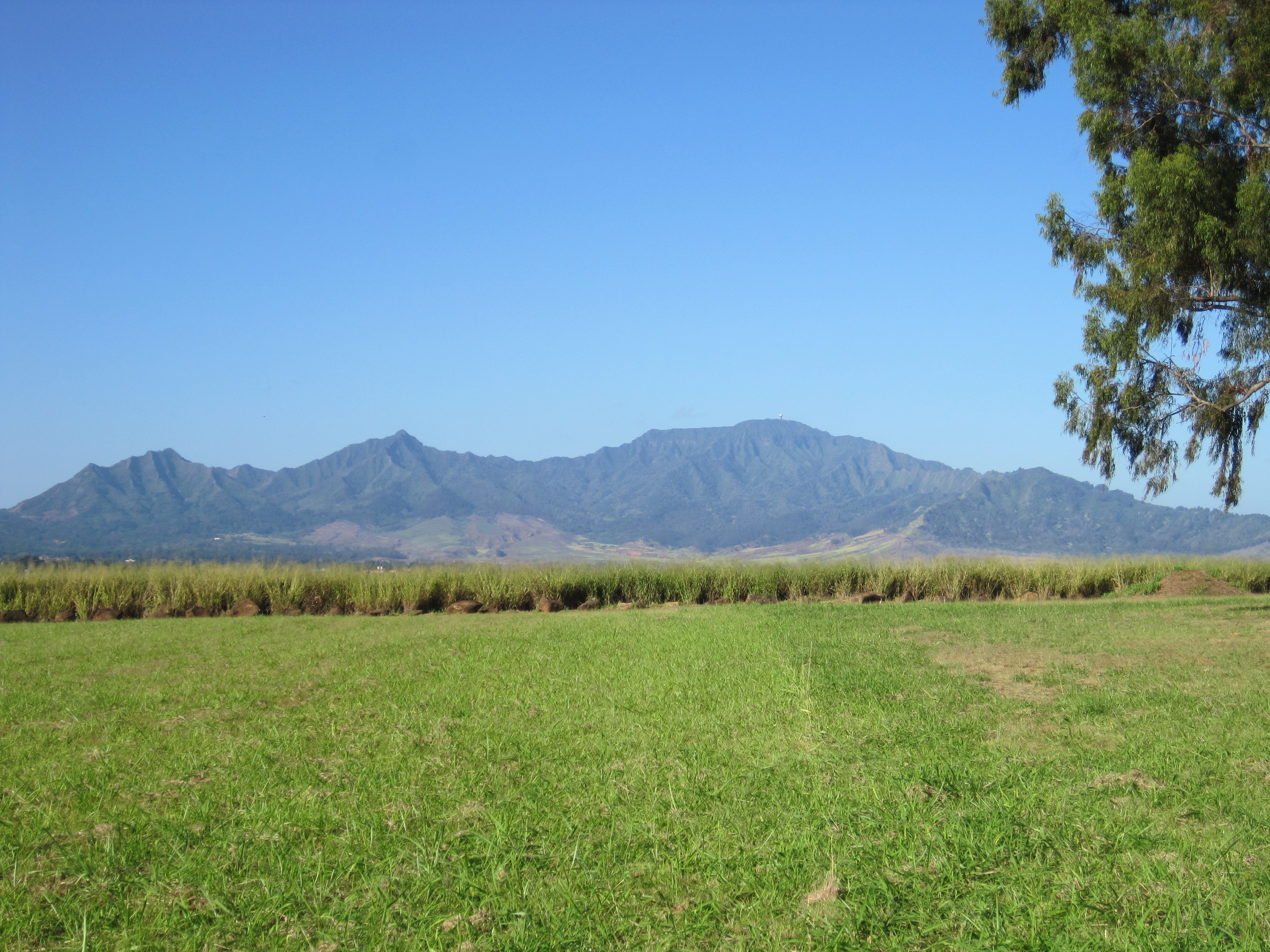
Shape of northern Waiʻanae Range

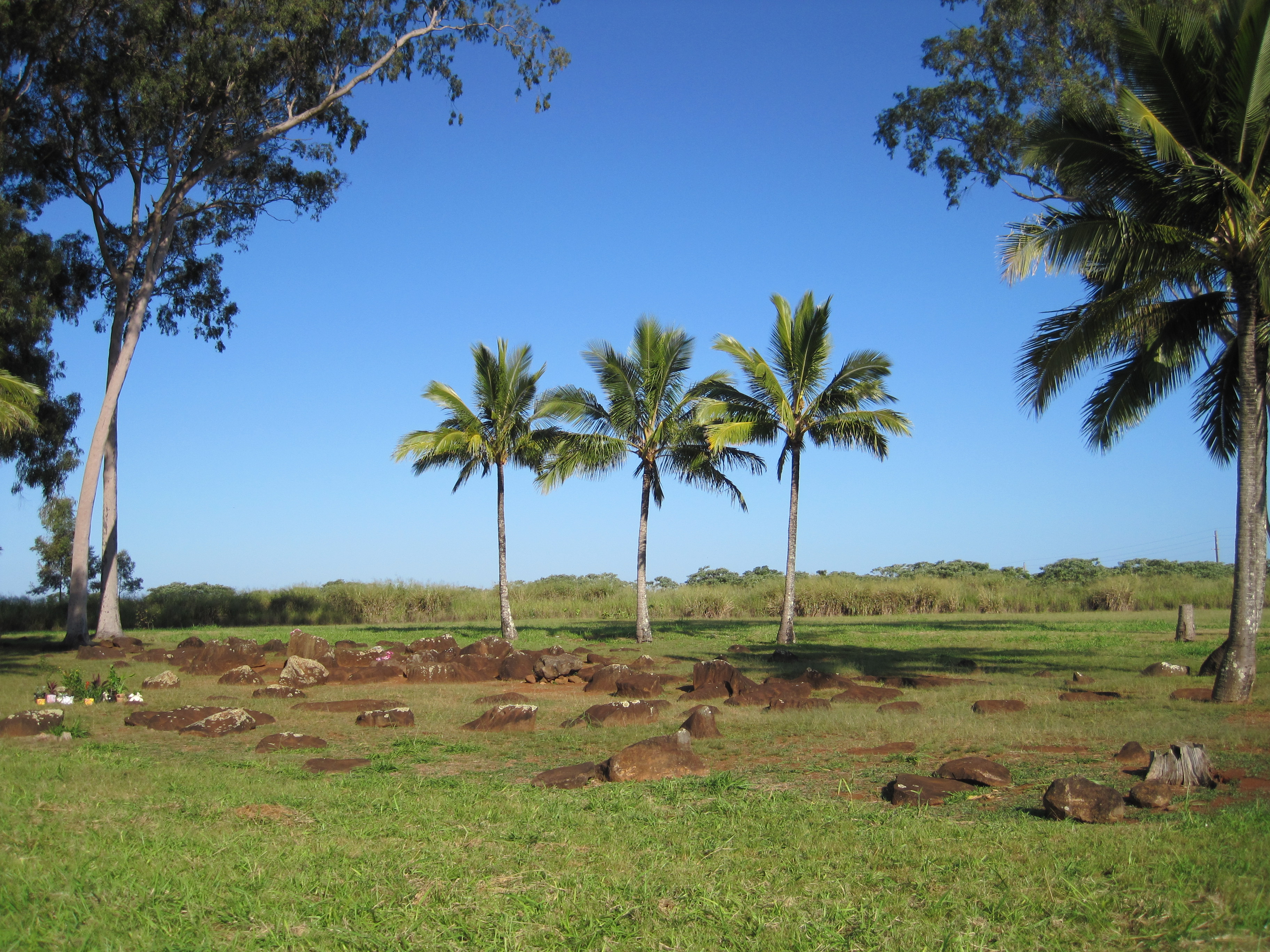
Central stones and coconut palms

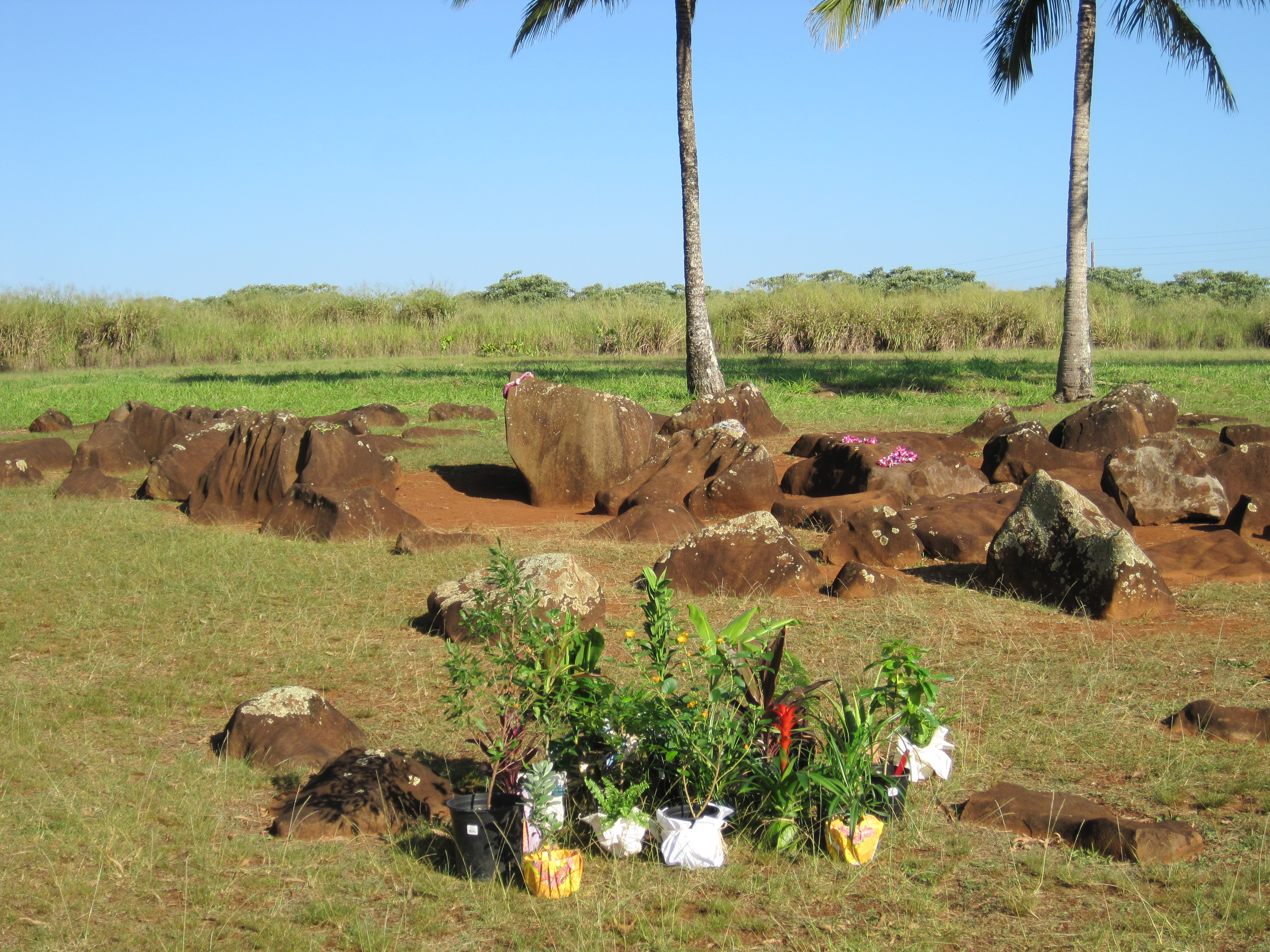
Plant offerings at central stones

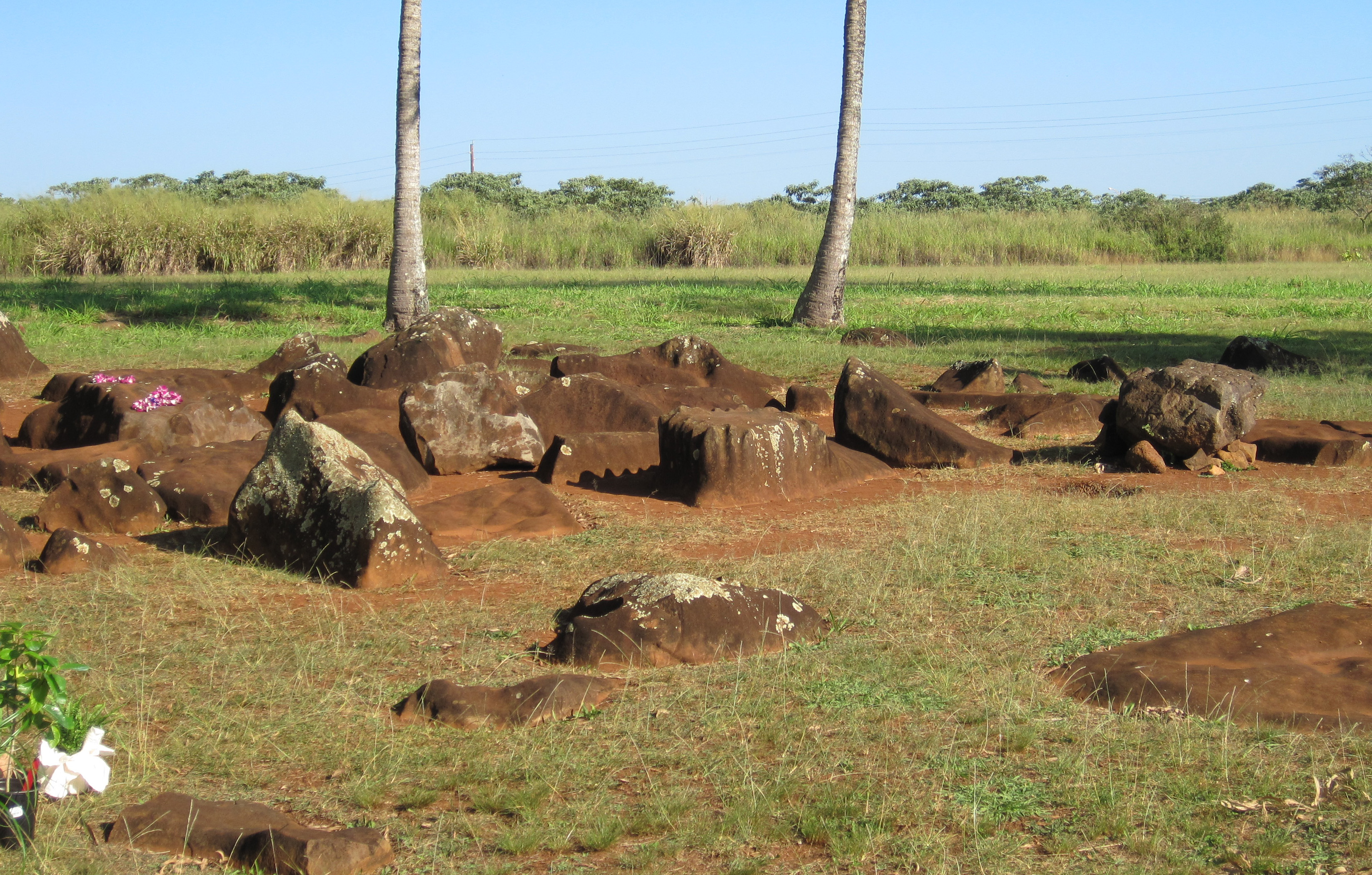
Corrugated central stone

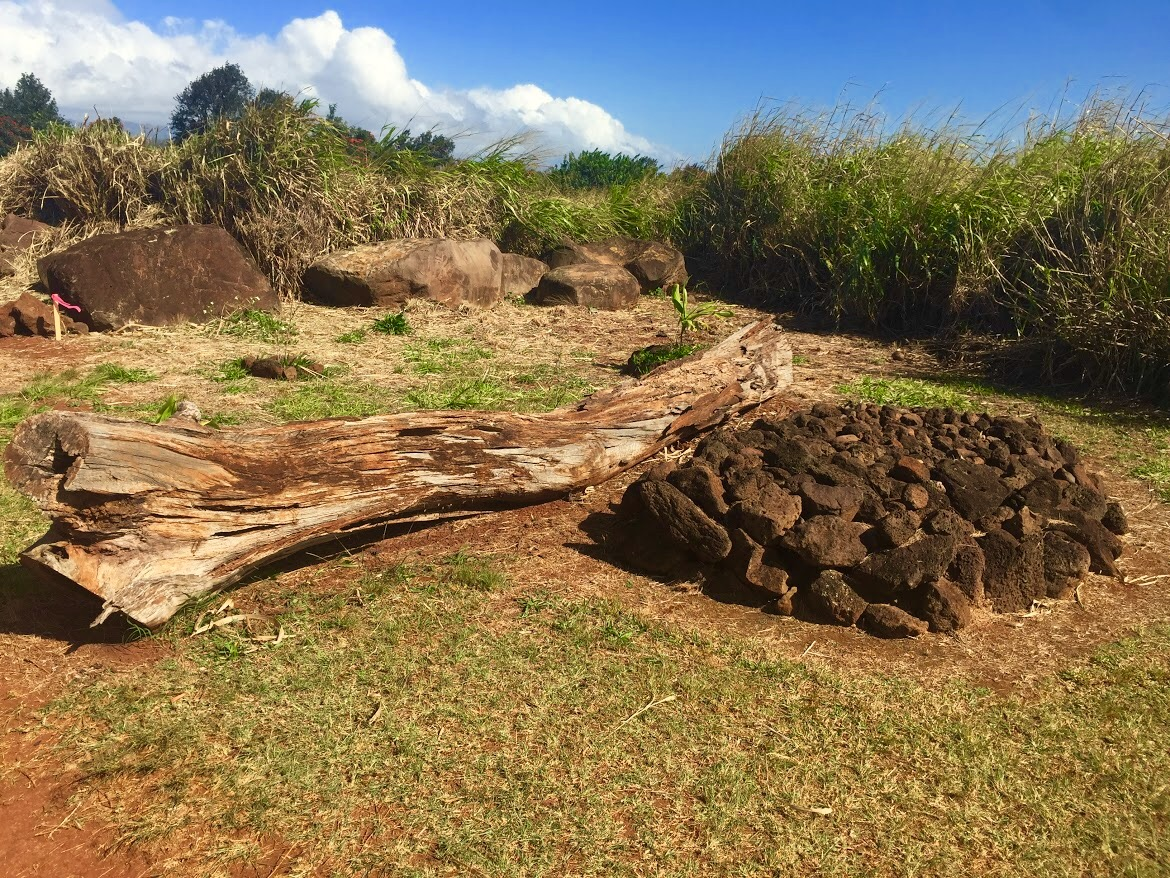
Kūkaniloko Birth site entrance
