= Kalanipauahi =

Member of the royal family of the Kingdom of Hawaii

Pauahi
- Born: c. 1804; Waikiki, Oʻahu
- Died: June 17, 1826; Honolulu, Oʻahu
- Spouse: Kamehameha II (as consort); Kahalaiʻa Luanuʻu; Mataio Kekūanaōʻa
- Issue: Keʻelikōlani
- House: Kamehameha
- Father: Pauli Kaʻōleiokū
- Mother: Keouawahine

Pauahi (c.1804–1826) was a member of the royal family of the Kingdom of Hawaii in the House of Kamehameha. Referred as Pauahi in her lifetime, she is often referred to as Kalanipauahi or Kalani Pauahi to differentiate her from her niece and namesake Bernice Pauahi Bishop.

== Life ==
Pauahi was born circa 1804. Her mother was Keouawahine, daughter of Kauhiwawaeono of Maui by his wife, chiefess Loe-wahine, who in turn was daughter of Kameʻeiamoku. Her father was the High Chief Pauli Kaʻōleiokū (1767–1818).

The name Pauahi originated in an incident which occurred in her childhood. By an accidental explosion of gunpowder she narrowly escaped being burned to death. Five men were killed in the catastrophe, her mother house was burned to the ground, and she was badly injured. In commemorating her escape she was given the name Pauahi, which is composed of two Hawaiian words, pau, "finished", or "completed" and ahi, "fire", which, when translated, means "the fire is out".

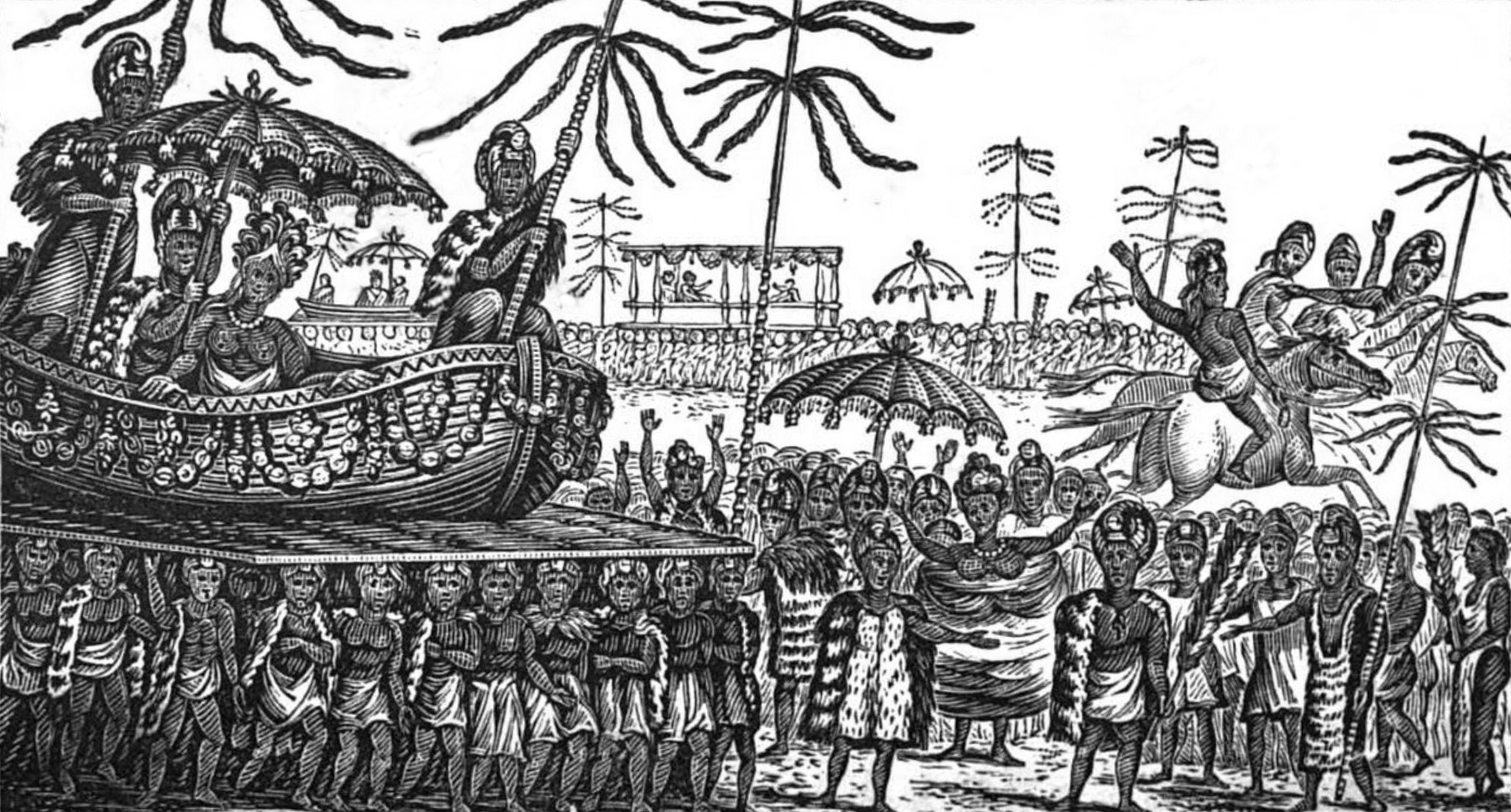
Celebratory procession of the feast of Kamehameha, 1823. Pauahi's float is probably in the background.

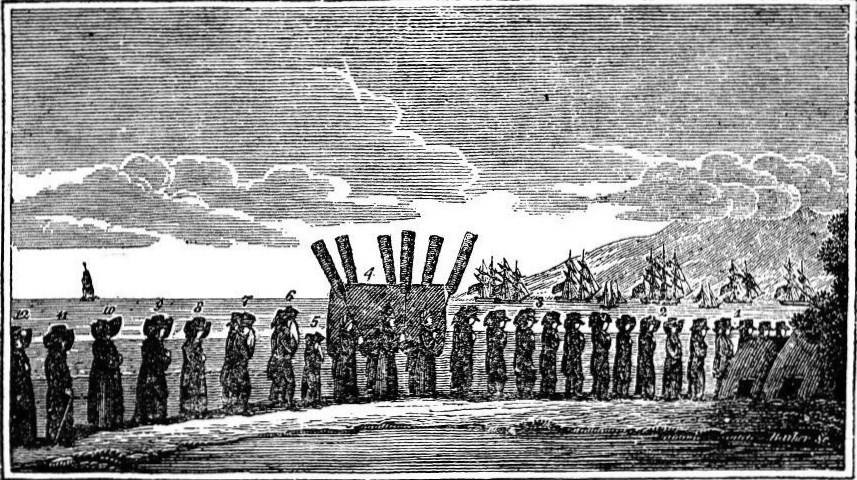
Pauahi, alongside the pall-bearers in the center of funeral procession of Queen Keōpūolani, 1823.

She married her uncle Kamehameha II as one of his five consorts. Kamehameha II was a younger son of Kamehameha I, so Pauahi was only seven years younger than her uncle. During the accession of Kamehameha II, Pauahi commemorated the fire incident of her childhood by descending from the couch in which she had been borne in the procession and setting it on fire with all the elaborate decorations. Her attendants imitated her example and cast clothing, both traditional tapa cloth and costly foreign cloth, into the flames.

Her first husband Kamehameha II died in London in 1824 and she became Queen dowager like all his other wives at a very young age. She remarried to Prince Kahalaiʻa Luanuʻu. Her second husband was Governor of Kauaʻi island, a nephew of king Kamehameha I, being the only son of the king's brother Kalaʻimamahu and his wife Kahakuhaʻakoʻi Wahinepio. She soon divorced Kahalaiʻa and remarried on November 28, 1825 her third husband, Mataio Kekūanaōʻa. Her daughter Ruth Keʻelikōlani was born February 9, 1826, after she had been married to Kekūanaōʻa for only a few months. Her daughter's unorthodox birth was a reason Keʻelikōlani was regarded somewhat outside the legitimate Hawaiian nobility. Her daughter's claim to royal heritage was because she herself was a member of the House of Kamehameha, and Hawaiian culture valued royal blood in a mother perhaps more than that of a father. Pauahi died after giving birth to Keʻelikōlani, and the cause was said to have been a flu type of illness which killed many people in 1826.

== See also ==
- Kamehameha family tree
