= Keauhou Bay =

- Kamehameha III's Birthplace
- U.S. National Register of Historic Places
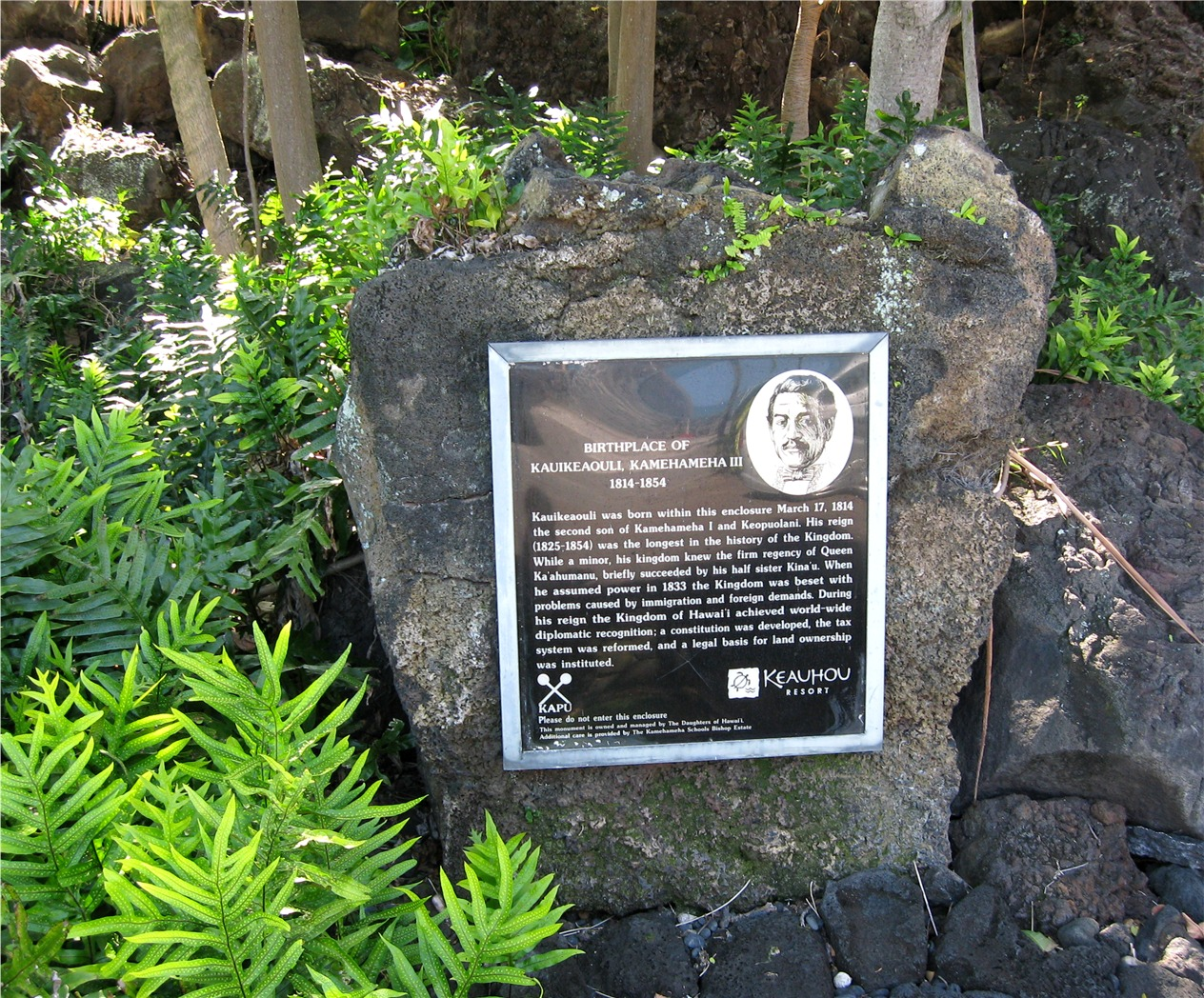
- A monument near the bay marks the royal history of the area

- Location within Hawaii
- Location: Kona District, Hawaii
- Coordinates: 19°33′38.86″N 155°57′43.25″W
- Area: 0.4 acres (0.16 ha)
- NRHP reference No.: 78001018
- Added to NRHP: July 24, 1978

Keauhou Bay is a historic area in the Kona District of the Big Island of Hawaiʻi. The name comes from ke au hou which means "the new era" in the Hawaiian Language.

== Kamehameha III's Birthplace ==
A small enclosure is maintained by the Daughters of Hawaii to mark the site of the birth of King Kamehameha III in 1814, the second son of Kamehameha I and Keopuolani. The early part of his reign he was under a regency by Kaʻahumanu. He was the longest reigning monarch in the Kingdom of Hawaii, until his death December 15, 1854. The site includes the Kauikeaouli stone (his birth name), added to the Hawaii register of historic places as site 10-37-4383 on January 13, 1978. It was added to the National Register of Historic Places on July 24, 1978 as site 78001018.

It is said Kauikeaouli was stillborn, but put on the stone by a visiting Kahuna where he was revived with a sacred chant. The Daughters of Hawaiʻi held a ceremony marking the hundredth anniversary by placing a plaque with Queen Liliʻuokalani in attendance. They acquired the small parcel including the foundation of the house in 1925.

== Other historic sites ==
To the north of this area is the Kahaluʻu Bay Historic District, and uphill (mauka) is the Keauhou Holua Slide built under Kamehameha I. The Holua originally extended into Heʻeia Cove just north of the main bay. To the south is the birth site of the Battle at Kuamoʻo, fought in 1819.

== Recreation ==
The Keauhou area includes the Outrigger & Spa at Keauhou Bay, built in 1975, the 22.9-acre (93,000 m^{2}) Keauhou Shopping Center, two golf courses, timeshare, residential and resort condominiums and single-family residences. The largest convention center in Kona is located at the Outrigger, just South of the bay. The 2,400 acres (9.7 km^{2}) of the resort are owned by a subsidiary of Kamehameha Schools which sponsors cultural events at the facilities.

There is a small boat ramp for public use and commercial tour companies such as Dolphin Discoveries to Kealakekua Bay, and the Keauhou Canoe Club for canoe races. Above the bay the Kona Country Club golf course, built in 1966, was designed by William Bell.

== Gallery ==
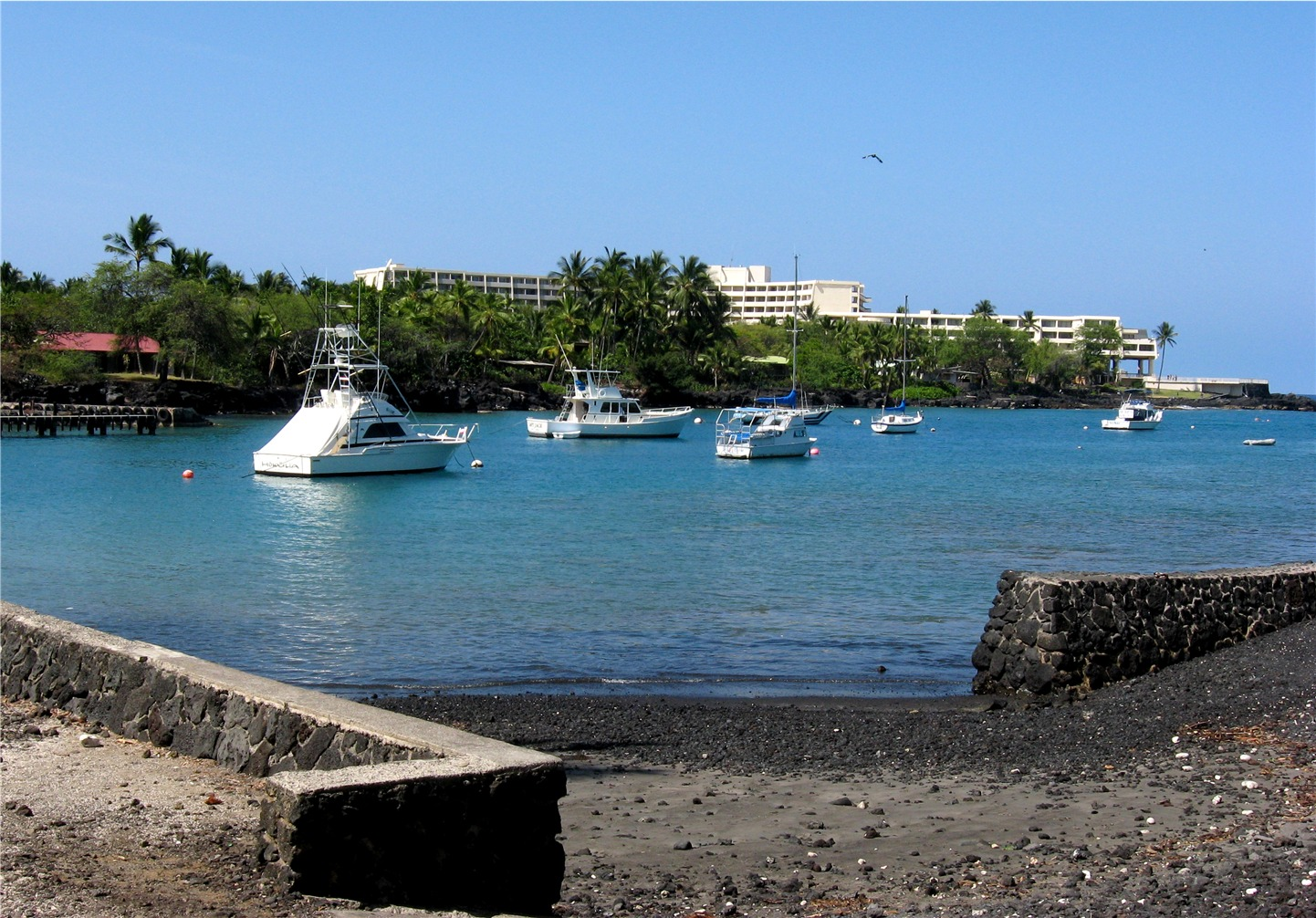
The boat ramp on the bay, with Sheraton Resort and Spa in background

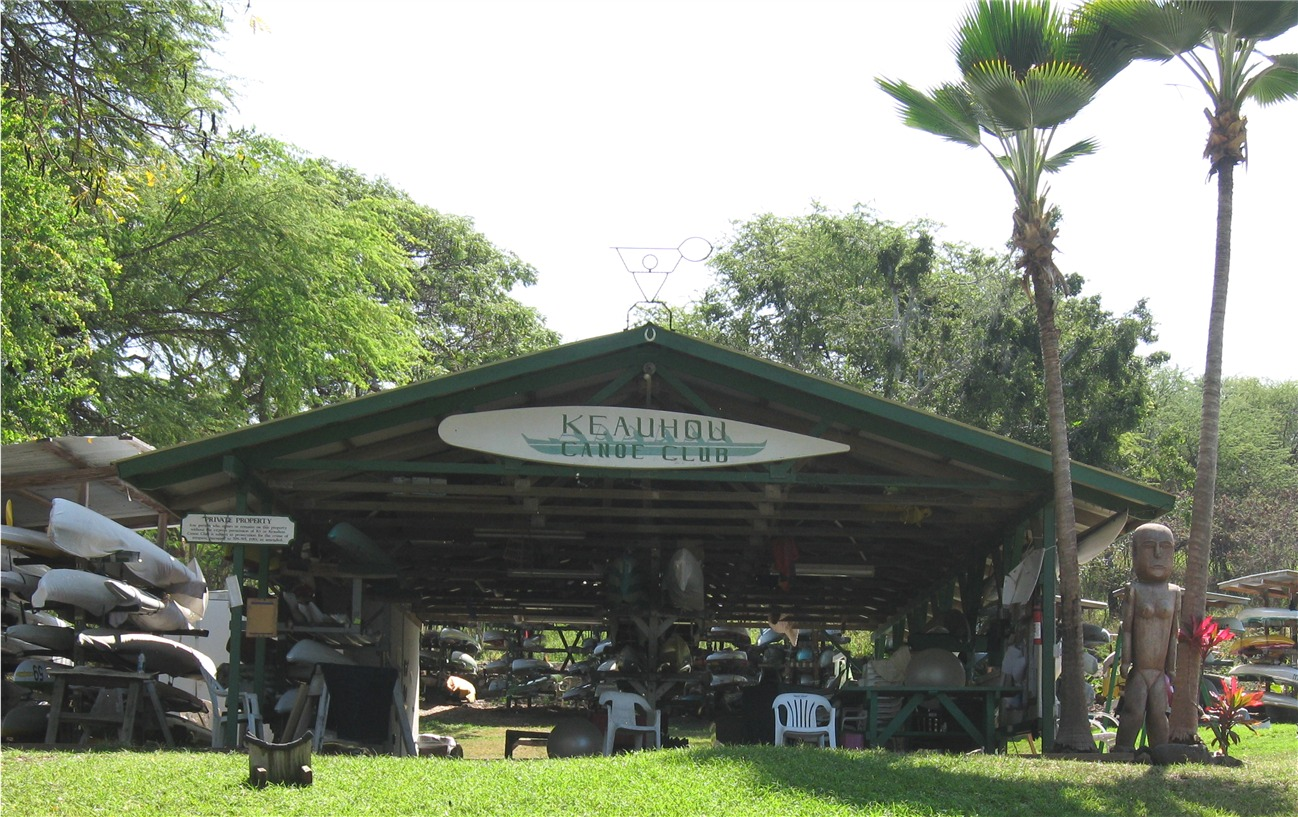
The Keauhou canoe club launches here

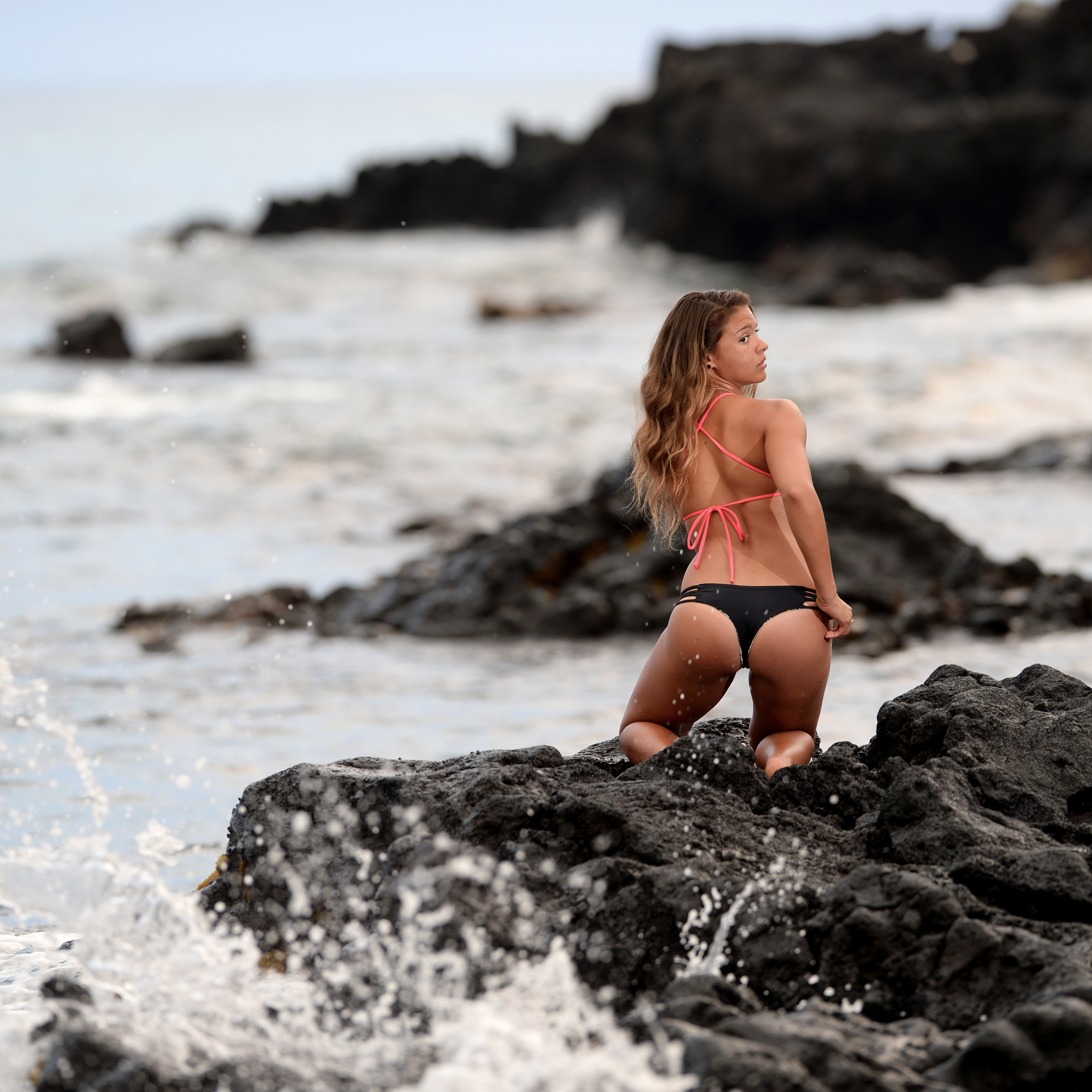
A model posing on the lava rocks of Keauhou Bay
