= Keōpūolani =

Queen consort of Hawaii (1778–1823)

- Queen consort of Hawaii
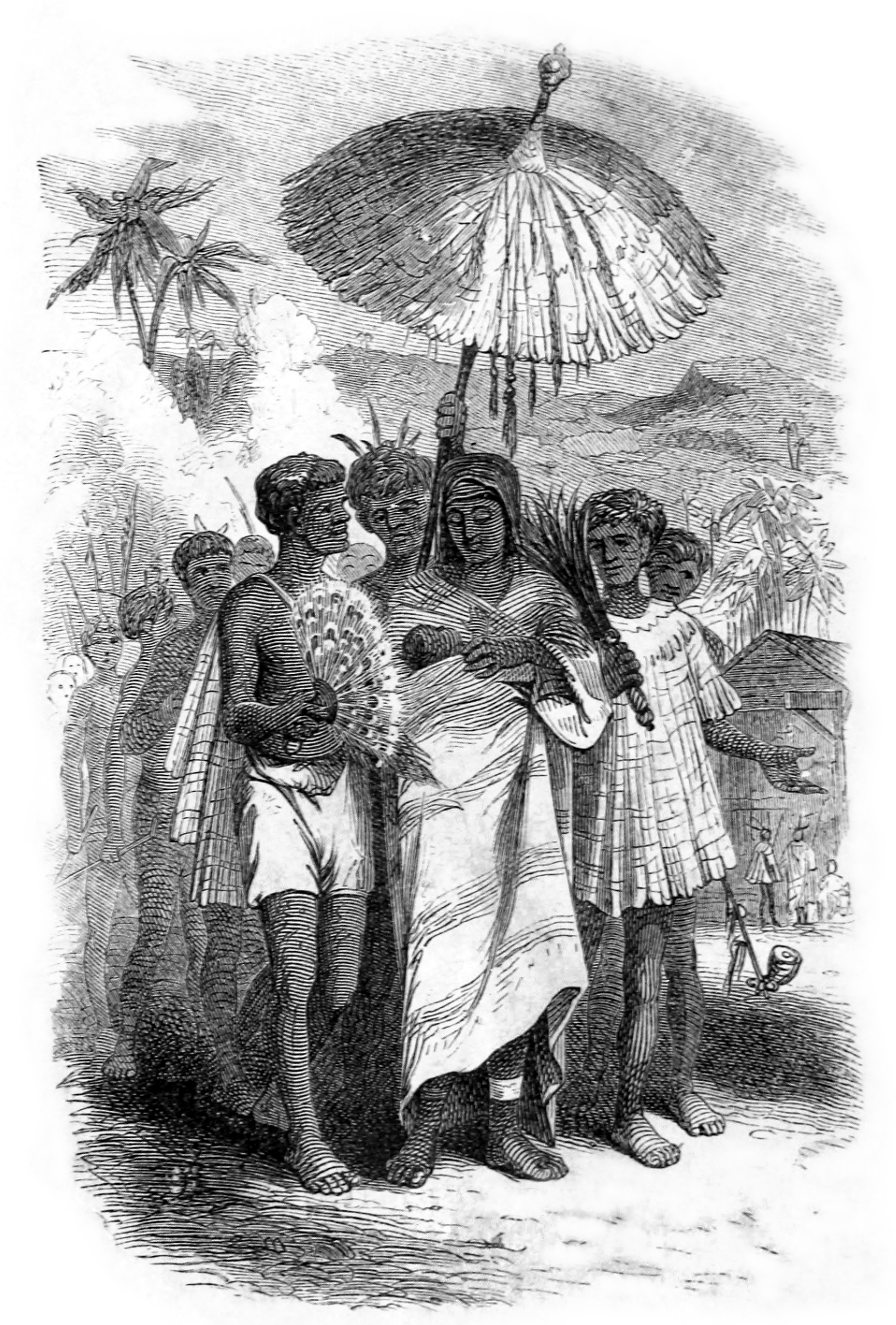
- A later romanticized illustration of the Queen and her retinue in the 1855 publication of The Christian Queen
- Born: c. 1778; Wailuku, Maui
- Died: September 16, 1823 (aged 45); Kaluaokiha, Luaʻehu, Lahaina, Maui
- Burial: Halekamani (until c. 1837); Mokuʻula (until c. 1884); Waiola Church
- Spouse: Kamehameha I Ulumāheihei Hoapili
- Issue: Kamehameha II; Kamehameha III; Nāhiʻenaʻena eight others
Names
- Kalanikauikaʻalaneo Kai Keōpūolani-Ahu-i-Kekai-Makuahine-a-Kama-Kalani-Kau-i-Kealaneo
- House: House of Kamehameha
- Father: Kīwalaʻō
- Mother: Kekuʻiapoiwa Liliha

Kalanikauikaʻalaneo Kai Keōpūolani-Ahu-i-Kekai-Makuahine-a-Kama-Kalani-Kau-i-Kealaneo (1778–1823) was a queen consort of Hawaiʻi and the highest ranking wife of King Kamehameha I.

== Early life ==
Keōpūolani was born around 1778 at an area known as Pahoehoe of Pāpōhaku, near present-day Wailuku, on the island of Maui. She was known as Kalanikauikaʻalaneo in her early childhood. Her name means "Gathering of the Clouds of Heaven".

Her father was Kīwalaʻō, King of Hawaiʻi island. He was the son of King Kalaniʻōpuʻu of Hawaiʻi island who met Captain James Cook at Kealakekua Bay.

Her mother was Queen Kekuʻiapoiwa Liliha, half-sister of Kamehameha I. Their father was Keōuakupuapāikalani.

Kiwalaʻō and Kekuʻiapoiwa Liliha were half-siblings through their shared mother, High Chiefess Kalola-Pupuka-Honokawahilani of Maui.

As a child, Keōpūolani lived for a while in Hāna (the eastern tip of Maui), then moved back to the Wailuku area.

== Battle of Kepaniwai ==
In 1790, while Keōpūolani was 11, Kamehameha attacked the island of Maui at the Battle of Kepaniwai while her great-uncle King Kahekili II was away on the island Oʻahu. When Maui forces under Kalanikupule lost to Kamehameha, Kalola along with her two daughters, many Maui chiefesses and Keōpūolani tried to flee to Oʻahu. They stopped in Molokaʻi as sickness overcame the elderly Kalola, and were caught by Kamehameha's forces. Kalola offered her granddaughter as a future bride and the recognition of Kamehameha as the ruler of Maui in exchange for peace. Other Maui chiefesses also joined Kamehameha's court.

She was given the name Wahinepio (captive women) around this time, but this name is usually associated with another chiefess. She was commonly known as Keōpūolani.

== Ancestry and rank ==
Keōpūolani was among the highest aliʻi of all the islands of Hawaiʻi in her days, a ranking called naha. This meant she was the product of a royal half-sister and brother marriage.

Her extended genealogy displays an extreme case of pedigree collapse; in the five preceding generations, the 64 possible positions for her ancestors are filled by only 30 individuals, largely due to multiple half-sibling marriages (by comparison, Charles II of Spain, an extreme case of European royal pedigree collapse, has 32 individuals in those positions, in his case largely due to multiple uncle-niece marriages).

This lineage gave her unquestionable social and political influence, which made her a coveted marriage partner for a chief to ensure heirs to inherit the combined ranks and birthrights of both parents. She married Kamehameha in 1795 and their marriage linked the House of Kamehameha to the ruling house of Maui and the old ruling house of Hawaii. Although Kamehameha had his own claims to these islands, Keōpūolani further cemented his legitimacy over his usurpation of his cousin, Keōpūolani's father.

She possessed the kapu moe (prostrating taboo) which required commoners to fall to their face on the ground at her presence. When chanters mentioned her name, listeners removed their kapa (bark cloth) garments above the waist in deference. Even the touching of her shadow by commoners was punishable by death. She was kindhearted and never enforced those punishments. Even Kamehameha had to remove his malo (loincloth) in her presence. She was amiable and affectionate, while her husband was not. Keōpūolani was strict in the observance of the kapu, but mild in her treatment of those who had broken it, so they often fled to her protection.

== Children ==
She mothered at least three of Kamehameha's children: Prince Liholiho in 1797 (later King Kamehameha II), Prince Kauikeaouli in 1814 (later King Kamehameha III), and Princess Nāhiʻenaʻena in 1815.

Perhaps up to eleven or twelve children were born but all except the three mentioned died young.

Because of the large age difference, Kamehameha called his children born to Keōpūolani his grandchildren. The children of nieces and nephews were collectively grandchildren among the older generations of true grandparents and their siblings. Only his children by Keōpūolani were considered so sacred that the Great Warrior would lie on his back and allow them to sit on his chest as a sign of their superior status. The sons were taken away to be raised by others, but she would break the Hawaiian tradition of hānai and keep her daughter Nāhiʻenaʻena by her side.

== King Kamehameha's death ==
Upon the death of Kamehameha I in 1819, Keōpūolani's eldest son, Liholiho, ascended the throne as Kamehameha II. For the most part, Keōpūolani stayed out of politics, but generally supported Kamehameha I's favorite wife Kaʻahumanu, who served as Kuhina Nui (Regent) during the short reign of Liholiho. After the death of Kamehameha I, Keōpūolani married High Chief Hoapili, a close friend of Kamehameha who was the son of Kameʻeiamoku, one of the royal twins. Hoapili was given the honor of secretly carrying the remains of Kamehameha by canoe to a secret site on the coast of Kona. This burial mystery has inspired the epitaph: "Only the stars of the heavens know the resting place of Kamehameha."

== ʻAi Noa and Christianity ==
Keōpūolani played an instrumental role in the ʻAi Noa, the overthrow of the Hawaiian kapu system. She collaborated with Queen Kaʻahumanu and Kahuna-nui Hewahewa, sharing a meal of forbidden foods. At the time, men were forbidden to eat with women according to the kapu. Since they were not punished by the gods, the kapu was broken.

The breaking of the kapu came at an instrumental time for the missionaries who came in 1820. She was among the first of the aliʻi to convert to Christianity. She adopted western clothing and learned to read and write.

In March, 1823, Hoapili, now royal governor of Maui, asked to be supplied with books for Keōpūolani to pursue her studies. For a domestic chaplain they used Pu-aʻa-i-ki, also known as "Blind Bartimeus", who was known as "a spiritual light". At this time, Keōpūolani made the public declaration that the custom of taking multiple spouses by royalty would be ending, to be consistent with Christian practice. Hoapili became her only husband.

== Illness ==
Keōpūolani became ill, and worsened the last week of August, 1823. Many chiefs began to assemble to pay their respects to the Queen. Vessels were dispatched for them to different parts of the Islands, and one was sent by the king to Honolulu for Dr. Blatchley. In the evening of September 8, sensing that she was dying, a messenger summoned the mission families to her house.

She extended her hand to them with a smile, and said "Maikai! — "Good", — and added, "Great is my love to God". In the morning she was a little better, and conversed with her husband Hoapili.

To the prime minister, Kalanimoku, on his arrival, she is quoted by the missionaries:

Jehovah is a good God. I love him and I love Jesus Christ. I have given myself to him to be his. When I die, let none of the evil customs of this country be practiced. Let not my body be disturbed. Let it be put in a coffin. Let the teachers attend, and speak to the people at my interment. Let me be buried, and let my burial be after the manner of Christ's people. I think very much of my grandfather, Kalaniopuʻu, and my father Kiwalaʻo, and my husband Kamehameha, and all my deceased relatives. They lived not to see these good times, and to hear of Jesus Christ. They died depending on false gods. I exceedingly mourn and lament on account of them, for they saw not these good times."

== Baptism and death ==
Keōpūolani wanted to receive Christian baptism. The missionaries in Lahaina, Charles Stewart and William Richards, agreed it would be appropriate. However, they wanted a spokesman fluent in the Hawaiian language so the implications of the public ceremony would be clearly understood.

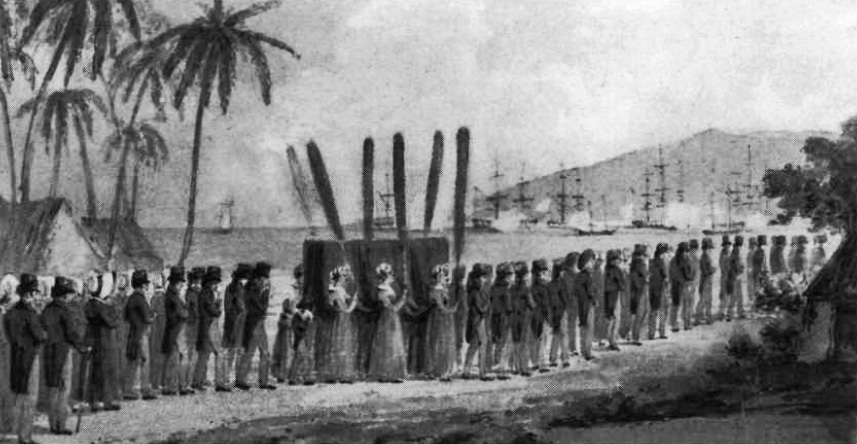
Sketch by Ellis of the funeral

English missionary William Ellis arrived at this time, and the dying woman was acknowledged as a member of the church. The king and all the assembled leaders listened to Ellis's statement of the grounds on which baptism was administered to the queen; and when they saw that water was sprinkled on her in the name of God, they said, "Surely she is no longer ours. She has given herself to Jesus Christ. We believe she is his, and will go to dwell with him." She wanted her daughter Nāhiʻenaʻena to be raised as a Christian. Keōpūolani took her Christian name from Charles Stewart's wife Harriet Stewart, and her daughter would take the same name. An hour afterwards, in the early evening of September 16, 1823, she died.

The next day, the ships in port fired their guns in salute, and a large public funeral was held on September 18, 1823. She was buried at a new tomb at Hale Kamani in Lahaina. In 1837, King Kamehameha III transferred her body to the sacred island of Mokuʻula in Lahaina, Maui. Later her remains were perhaps reburied at the Christian cemetery at Waiola Church, along with her daughter and many others in the royal family. Keōpūolani Park at 700 Halia Nakoa Street in Wailuku 20°53′37″N 156°29′4″W and Keōpūolani Dormitory on the Kapalama Campus of Kamehameha Schools were named after her.

== Family ==
=== Family tree ===
Kamehameha family tree

Kalaniʻōpuʻu (k)	Kalola (w)	Keōua (k)	Kekuʻiapoiwa II (w)	Kānekapōlei (w)
Kīwalaʻō	Kekuiapoiwa Liliha
Keōpūolani	Kamehameha I (The Great) (died 1819)	Kalākua Kaheiheimālie	Kaʻahumanu (1819–1832)
Liholiho; Kamehameha II (1819–1824)	Kamāmalu	Keouawahine	Pauli Kaʻōleiokū _{*Paternity is in question as daughter and mother both claim Kalaniopuu as the father.}	Kahailiopua; Luahine
Kauikeaouli; Kamehameha III (1825–1854)	Kalama	Elizabeth Kīnaʻu; Kaʻahumanu II	Mataio; Kekūanaōʻa	Pauahi	Laura Kōnia	Abner Pākī
Keaweaweʻulaokalani I	Keaweaweʻulaokalani II
Queen Emma	Alexander Liholiho; Kamehameha IV (1854–1863)	Lot Kapuāiwa; Kamehameha V (1863–1872)	Victoria Kamāmalu; Kaʻahumanu IV (1855–1863)	Ruth Keʻelikōlani	Charles Reed; Bishop	Bernice Pauahi; Bishop
Albert Kamehameha	John William Pitt Kīnaʻu	Keolaokalani Davis

=== Ancestry ===
Ancestors of Keōpūolani

8. Kalaninuiamamao, High Chief of Kaʻū
4. Kalaniʻōpuʻu of Hawaiʻi
9. Kamakaʻimoku (=#13)
2. Kiwalaʻo of Hawaiʻi
10. King Kekaulike of Maui (=#14)
5. Kalola Pupuka-o-Honokawailani of Maui (=#7)
11. Princess Kekuʻiapoiwa of Maui (=#15)
1. Keōpūolani
12. Prince Keʻeaumoku, High Chief of Kona and Kohala
6. High Chief Keōua Kalanikupuapaikalaninui
13. Kamakaʻimoku (=#9)
3. Kekuʻiapoiwa Liliha
14. Kekaulike (=#10)
7. Kalola Pupuka-o-Honokawailani (=#5)
15. Kekuʻiapoiwa of Maui (=#11)

== Bibliography ==
- Langlas, Charles; Lyon, Jeffrey (2008). Davida Malo's Unpublished Account of Keopuolani. Vol. 42. Honolulu: Hawaiian Historical Society. pp. 27–48. hdl:10524/588.
- The Christian Queen. New York: The American Tract Society. 1855. OCLC 21921666.

Royal titles
Preceded by none	Queen consort of Hawaiʻi; 1795–1819	Succeeded by Kamāmalu
Preceded by none	Queen mother of Hawaiʻi; 1819–1823	Succeeded by none
