= Kalola Pupuka =

Hawaiian chiefess and princess (f. 1790)

Kalola Pupuka-o-Honokawailani
- Spouse: Kalaniʻōpuʻu; Keōua; Kamehamehanui Aiʻluau; Kaopuiki
- Issue: Kīwalaʻō; Kekuiapoiwa Liliha; Kalanikauikikilokalaniakua Kaoiwikapuokalani
- Father: Kekaulike
- Mother: Kekuiapoiwa I

Kalola Pupuka-o-Honokawailani was a Hawaiian high chiefess. The first Europeans in Hawaii called her Rora-rora.

== Biography ==
She was a daughter of King Kekaulike of Maui and Kekuiapoiwa I. She was the full-blood sister of Kamehamehanui Aiʻluau and Kahekili II.

She married the king Kalaniʻōpuʻu of Hawaii and had a son called Kīwalaʻō who became a king. She also married her brother-in-law, chief Keōua, and had a daughter Kekuiapoiwa Liliha. Kekuiapoiwa Liliha married Kīwalaʻō and their child was Queen Keōpūolani, consort of Kamehameha I and mother of two kings. She was also married to her brother Kamehamehanui Aiʻluau at one time with whom she was the mother of Kalanikauikikilokalaniakua, the highest ranking chiefess in her days on whom the sun was not permitted to shine and who was allowed to climb about the kapu heiau of the kapu gods. Kalanikauikikilo committed suicide in 1808 at Honuakaha by taking the kālaipāhoa poison in protest of the marriage of her niece to Kamehameha I. Kalola was married to a chief by the name of Kaopuiki at the time the American ship Eleanora was in Maui in 1790.

== Bibliography ==
- Fornander, Abraham (1880). Stokes, John F. G. (ed.). An Account of the Polynesian Race: Its Origins and Migrations, and the Ancient History of the Hawaiian People to the Times of Kamehameha I. Vol. 2. London: Trübner & Company.
- Kamakau, Samuel (1992) [1961]. Ruling Chiefs of Hawaii (Revised ed.). Honolulu: Kamehameha Schools Press. ISBN 0-87336-014-1.
- King, James; Clerke, Charles; Gore, John; Cook, James (1784). A Voyage to the Pacific Ocean. Vol. 3. London: Nicol and Cadell.
- Mookini, Esther T. (1998). "Keopuolani: Sacred Wife, Queen Mother, 1778-1823". Hawaiian Journal of History. 32. Honolulu: Hawaiian Historical Society: 1–24. hdl:10524/569.
