= Kīwalaʻō =

Aliʻi nui of Hawaiʻi Island (1760–1782)

- Aliʻi nui of Hawaiʻi Island
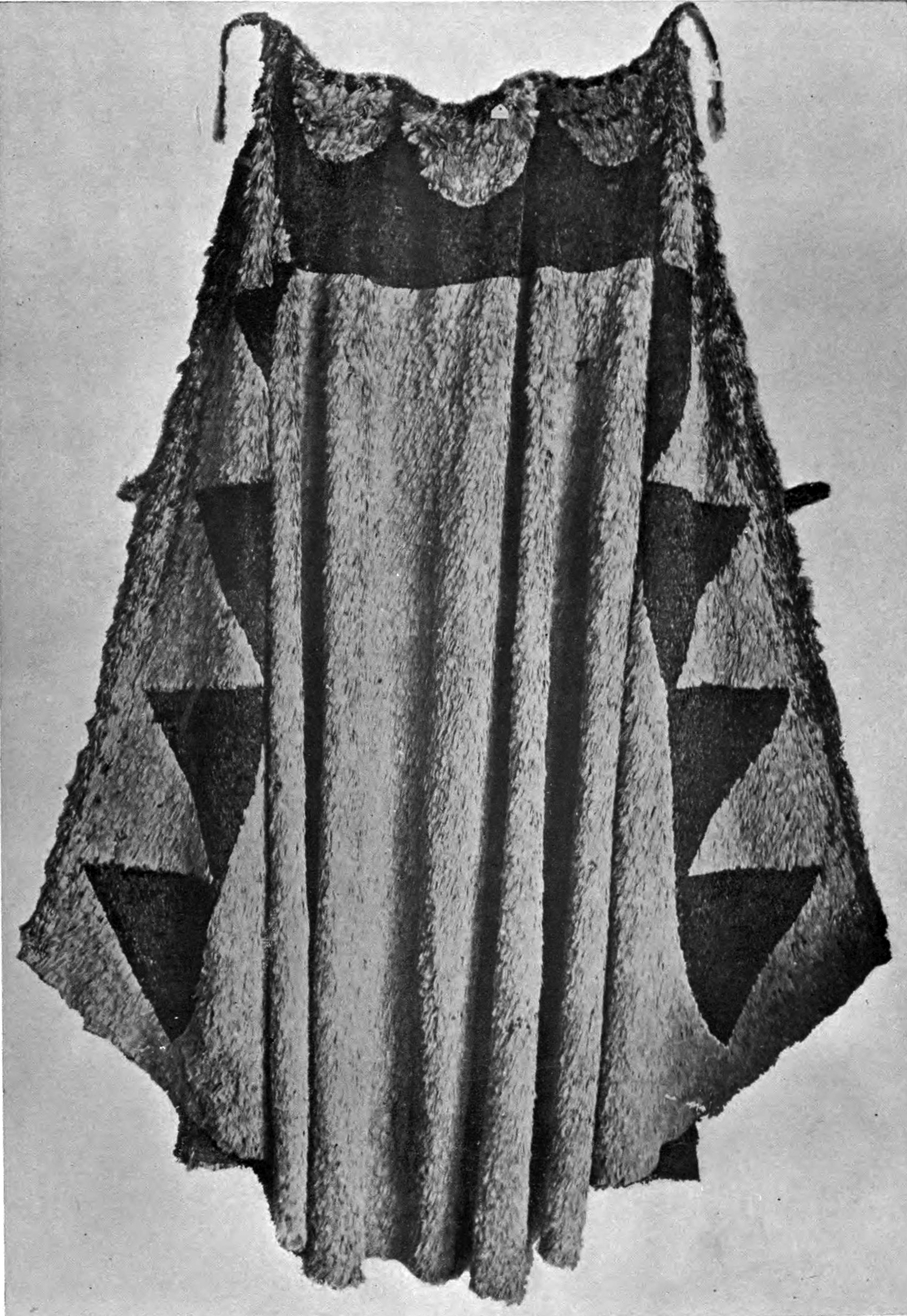
- The cloak of Kīwalaʻō, 1899
- Died: July, 1782; Battle of Mokuʻōhai
- Spouse: Kekuʻiapoiwa Liliha
- Issue: Keōpūolani
- Father: Kalaniʻōpuʻu
- Mother: Kalola Pupuka-o-Honokawailani

Kīwalaʻō (c. 1760 – July 1782) was the aliʻi nui of the island of Hawaii in 1782 when he was defeated at the Battle of Mokuohai and overthrown by Kamehameha I.

== Early life ==
Kīwalaʻō was born in 1760 to Aliʻi Nui, Kalaniʻōpuʻu and his queen consort Kalola Pupuka. He was the eldest son of the ruler and was the heir apparent. While he was alive at the time of Captain Cook's arrival, he was not present and there is no foreign account of him.

He is said to have been of a weak character while his half brother Keōua Kuahuula was the exact opposite and more comparable to the knights of the Middle Ages.
