= Kaahumanu (disambiguation) =

Kaʻahumanu may refer to:

Early rulers of the Kingdom of Hawaiʻi:

- Kaʻahumanu Queen Kaʻahumanu I (1768–1832)
- Kaʻahumanu II Elizabeth Kīnaʻu, or Kaʻahumanu II (c. 1805–1839)
- Kaʻahumanu III Miriam Auhea Kekāuluohi, or Kaʻahumanu III (1794–1845)
- Kaʻahumanu IV Victoria Kamāmalu, or Kaʻahumanu IV (1838–1866)

Other people:

- Virginia Kaihikapumahana Wilcox known as Kahoa Kaʻahumanu
- Lani Ka'ahumanu
- Kapumahana Kaʻahumanu Walters (born 1979)

Other:

- Kaʻahumanu Society civic society
- Queen Kaʻahumanu Highway, part of the Hawaii Belt Road
- Kaʻahumanu Avenue, Hawaii Route 32 on Maui

== See also ==
- Kuhina Nui office held by above rulers
