= David Kamehameha =

Hawaiian prince (1828–1835)

- Prince of Hawaiʻi
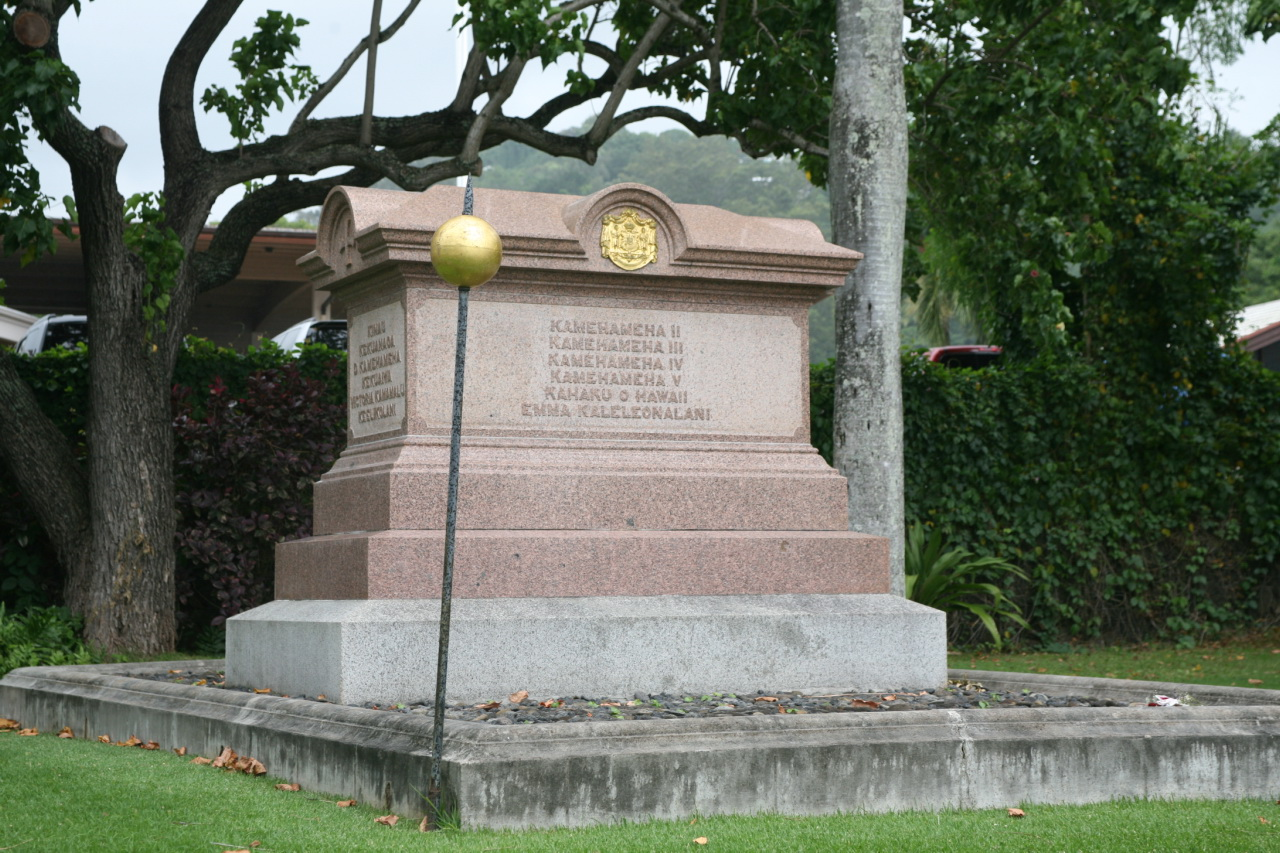
- The Kamehameha Tomb at Mauna ʻAla, his name is inscribed on the left side of the monument under "D. Kamehameha".
- Born: May 20, 1828; Honolulu, Oʻahu
- Died: December 15, 1835 (aged 7); Honolulu, Oʻahu
- Burial: Mauna ʻAla Royal Mausoleum
- House: Kamehameha
- Father: Kekūanaōʻa
- Mother: Kīnaʻu; Kaʻahumanu (hānai); Kekāuluohi (hānai)

David Kamehameha (1828–1835) was a member of the royal family of the Kingdom of Hawaii.

== Biography ==
Born May 20, 1828, he was the firstborn and eldest son of Mataio Kekūanaōʻa and Elizabeth Kīnaʻu. He was a grandson of King Kamehameha I through his mother and was named in his grandfather's honor and after the biblical king David, in respect to his parents' conversion to Christianity. He had three brothers, Moses Kekūāiwa (1829–1848), Lot Kapuāiwa (1830–1872), Alexander Liholiho (1834–1863), and a sister Victoria Kamāmalu (1838–1866). He had other siblings, an unnamed, elder half-brother from his mother's previous marriage to Kahalaiʻa Luanuʻu, who died young; and half-sister Ruth Keʻelikōlani (1826–1883), from his father's previous marriage. Laura Fish Judd, wife of missionary Gerrit P. Judd, described the prince as "a boy fine enough for any mother not of the seed royal to glory in."

In the Hawaiian tradition of hānai, he was given in adoption to his "grandmother", Queen Kaʻahumanu, alongside Keʻelikōlani. David's birth had helped reconcile Kaʻahumanu to his mother's refusal to marry her half-brother, Kamehameha III, in accordance with the wishes of Kamehameha I. His aunt, Kekāuluohi, helped the old Queen take care of him. Queen Kaʻahumanu was the most powerful figure in Hawaii at the time, serving as kuhina nui (premier) and regent for Kamehameha III; she often found trouble in dealing with the young king's guardian, Boki, the royal governor of Oʻahu, who publicly accused her of scheming to place David Kamehameha on the throne, an accusation she denied. When news reached her that Boki was coming to kill her, she said "I do not fear death planned by this son of ours, but he will have [come] himself to kill me and these grandchildren of mine who will stay by me." Luckily, Boki was convinced by David's father, Kekūanaōʻa, to give up his idea of declaring war on the dowager Queen. When he was four in 1832, Kaʻahumanu died of intestinal illness at her house in the Mānoa Valley, and afterwards, David was either raised by Kekāuluohi, although Kīnaʻu still had a hand in his upbringing. Her mother succeeded as kuhina nui in Kaʻahumanu's place and styled herself Kaʻahumanu II.

He died of unknown causes on December 15, 1835, in Honolulu, in his mother's stone house near the present Iolani Palace. He was laid to rest in the Pohukaina Tomb on the grounds of the future ʻIolani Palace (both the first and second palace had yet to be built) and later his remains were transported to the Mauna ʻAla Royal Mausoleum. In 1836, Kapaʻakea and Keohokālole named their third son David Kalākaua, probably in honor of the premier's dead son.

== Family tree ==
Below is a simplified family tree showing the immediate relatives of David Kamehameha:

Kalaʻimamahu	Kalākua; Kaheiheimālie (1778–1842)	Kamehameha I (The Great) (1758–1819)	Kaʻahumanu (1768–1832)
Miriam Auhea Kekāuluohi; Kaʻahumanu III (1794–1845)	Elizabeth Kīnaʻu; Kaʻahumanu II (1805–1839)	Mataio Kekūanaōʻa (1793–1868)	Kalani Pauahi (1804–1826)
Victoria Kamāmalu; Kaʻahumanu IV (1838–1866)	Alexander Liholiho; Kamehameha IV (1834–1863)	Lot Kapuāiwa; Kamehameha V (1830–1872)	Moses; Kekūāiwa (1829–1848)	David; Kamehameha (1828–1835)	Ruth Keʻelikōlani (1826–1883)
