= Bernice Pauahi Bishop =

Hawaiian aristocrat (1831–1884)

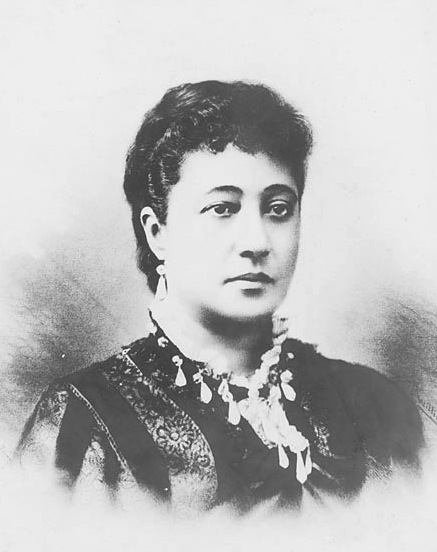
- Born: Bernice Pauahi Pākī; December 19, 1831 ʻAikupika, Haleākala, Honolulu, Oʻahu, Hawaii
- Died: October 16, 1884 (aged 52); Keōua Hale, Honolulu, Oʻahu, Hawaii
- Burial: November 2, 1884; Mauna ʻAla Royal Mausoleum, Oʻahu, Hawaii
- Spouse: Charles Reed Bishop (m. 1850)
- Issue: Keolaokalani Davis (hānai)
- Bernice Pauahi Pākī Bishop
- Father: Abner Pākī; Kekūanaōʻa (hānai)
- Mother: Laura Kōnia; Kīnaʻu (hānai)

Bernice Pauahi Pākī Bishop KGCOK RoK (December 19, 1831 – October 16, 1884) was an aliʻi (noble) of the royal family of the Kingdom of Hawaii and a well-known philanthropist.

== Ancestry, birth and early life ==
Pauahi was born in Honolulu on December 19, 1831, in ʻAikupika the grass hut compound of her father, Abner Kuhoʻoheiheipahu Pākī (c. 1808–1855). Pākī was an aliʻi (noble) from the island of Molokaʻi, and son of Kalani-hele-maiiluna, who descended from the aliʻi nui (ruling monarchs) of the island of Maui. Her mother was Laura Kōnia (c. 1808–1857), the younger daughter of Pauli Kaʻōleiokū (1767–1818), by his second wife, Kahailiopua Luahine. Kaʻōleiokū was the son of Kānekapōlei, wife of Kalaniʻōpuʻu and Kamehameha I, and Luahine was descended from Kalaimanokahoʻowaha who had greeted Captain James Cook in 1778. Pauahi was named for her aunt, Queen Pauahi (c. 1804–1826), a widow of King Kamehameha II, and given the Christian name of Bernice.

In a surviving mele hānau (birth chant) for Pauahi, the names Kalaninuiʻīamamao and Keaweikekahialiʻiokamoku are referenced, and considered her main links to the Kamehamehas. Kalaninuiʻīamamao was the father of Kalaniʻōpuʻu and "stepfather" of Keōua, Kamehameha I's father, while Keaweikekahialiʻiokamoku was the common ancestor of both men. Pauahi's birth chant does not mention Kamehameha I himself.

She was adopted at birth by Princess Kīnaʻu, sometime governing as Kuhina Nui (regent) with the style of Kaʻahumanu II, but was returned to her parents in 1838 when Kīnaʻu gave birth to her daughter, Victoria Kamāmalu. Kīnaʻu died of mumps in 1839. Pauahi began attending the Chiefs' Children's School (later called the Royal School) that same year and remained there until 1846. Her teachers were Mr. and Mrs. Cooke. Pauahi greatly enjoyed horseback riding and swimming, and she also liked music, flowers, and the outdoors. She dressed like any fashionable New York or London woman of the time.

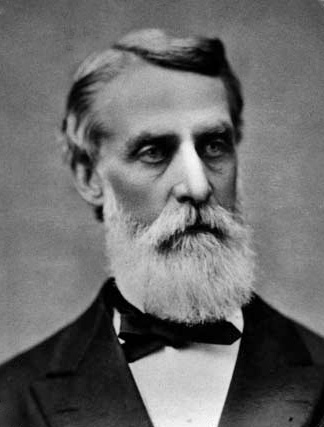
Husband Charles Reed Bishop

=== Marriage ===
It had been planned from her childhood that Pauahi, as a Hawaiian royal by birth, would marry her hānai (adopted) brother Prince Lot Kapuāiwa. Pauahi instead married businessman Charles Reed Bishop May 4, 1850, despite the objections of her parents. Per her request, very few people attended her wedding, among the witnesses being her cousin, Princess Elizabeth Kekaʻaniau. The couple had no children of their own. They adopted a son named Keolaokalani Davis from Pauahi's cousin, Princess Ruth Keʻelikōlani in 1862, against the wish of Ruth's husband, but the infant died at the age of six months. In 1883, they offered to adopt William Kaiheekai Taylor (1882–1956), the infant son of Pauahi's distant cousin Lydia Keōmailani Crowningburg and Wray Taylor; they were the boy's godparents at his christening in St. Andrews Cathedral. The Taylors refused to give up their firstborn son, but instead offered one of their twin daughters to the Bishops, who declined the second offer. The child, William Edward Bishop Kaiheekai Taylor was one of the first students at the Kamehameha's Preparatory Department, and would later serve as the kahu (caretaker) of the Royal Mausoleum of Hawaii at ʻMauna Ala from 1947 until his death in 1956.

== Eligibility to rule ==
Pauahi was educated at the Royal School and was eligible to be a named heir. Prince Lot Kapuāiwa ruled as Kamehameha V and offered Pauahi the throne on his deathbed in 1872. Taken aback, she replied, "No, no, not me; don't think of me. I don't need it." The king pressed on, but she again refused the throne: "Oh, no, do not think of me. There are others." This exchange was later corroborated by the personal writings of John Owen Dominis, husband of Liliʻuokalani, and Attorney General Stephen Henry Phillips. The king died an hour later, and Pauahi's refusal to accept the crown allowed Lunalilo to become the kingdom’s first elected monarch.

== Death and funeral ==
On October 16, 1884, at the age of 52, Pauahi died of breast cancer at Keōua Hale, Honolulu. She is interred in the Kamehameha Crypt of the Royal Mausoleum of Hawaii at Mauna ʻAla, on Oʻahu.

At her death, her estate was the largest private landownership in the Kingdom of Hawaii, comprising approximately 9% of its total area. The revenues from these lands are used to operate the Kamehameha Schools, which were established in 1887 according to Pauahi's will.

== Legacy ==
By the time of her death in 1884, her estate consisted of 485,563 acres (which was reduced to 375,569 acres by the January 22, 1886 meeting of the Trustees of the Bernice Pauahi Bishop Estate) of land across the Hawaiian Islands, which she had either purchased or inherited from her parents Pākī and Kōnia, from her aunt ʻAkahi, from her cousin Keʻelikōlani, and other relatives. These lands were incorporated after Pauahi's death into the Bernice Pauahi Bishop Estates, which funds the Kamehameha Schools to the present day.

Bishop wished that a portion of her estate be used "to erect and maintain in the Hawaiian Islands two schools ... one for boys and one girls, to be known as, and called the Kamehameha Schools." She directed her five trustees to invest her estate at their discretion and use the annual income to operate the schools. When she wrote her will, only 44,000 Hawaiians were alive. After Bishop's death in 1884, her husband Charles started work in carrying out her will.

The original Kamehameha School for Boys was established in 1887. The girls' school was established in 1894 on a nearby campus. By 1955, the schools moved to a 600-acre (2.4 km^{2}) location in the heights above Kapālama. Some time later, Kamehameha Schools established two more campuses on outer islands: Pukalani, Maui and the Kamehameha Schools Hawaii Campus in Keaʻau on the island of Hawaii.

Charles Reed Bishop founded the Bernice P. Bishop Museum in 1889 as another memorial to Pauahi, on the grounds of the original boys school.

In 1912, Walter F. Dillingham (of Dillingham Construction) purchased 84 acres (34 ha) from the former Bernice P. Bishop Estate, which used the land for property development to create the neighborhood of Waikīkī and many of its early related buildings and structures (including the Ala Wai Canal).

She was named a woman hero by The My Hero Project.

=== Will ===
Her will caused three major controversies. In 1992, a clause stating all Kamehameha Schools teachers must be Protestant was challenged as illegal religious discrimination in employment by the Equal Employment Opportunity Commission. The United States Court of Appeals for the Ninth Circuit reversed a decision of the district court, and found o mm that the school had not proved that it was "primarily religious", and thus this clause violated the Civil Rights Act of 1964.

In 1997, several conflicts of interest were charged. Trustees received up to $900,000 per year and put their own money into the investments of the estate. The Supreme Court of Hawaii was directed in the will to replacement trustees, but also ruled on many cases involving the estate. An essay by Judge Samuel Pailthorpe King and University of Hawaii William S. Richardson School of Law Professor Randall W. Roth and others was published as a series of newspaper articles, and later a book. After a number of legal battles, the trustees resigned and management was re-organized.

Trustees were also instructed "to devote a portion of each year's income to the support and education of orphans, and others in indigent circumstances, giving the preference to Hawaiians of pure or part aboriginal blood." Traditionally, this was interpreted as denying admission to students who could not prove native Hawaiian ancestry. A number of lawsuits challenged this policy, including a settlement reported to be $7 million.

== Honours ==
National honours

- Dame Grand Cross of the Royal Order of Kamehameha I.
- Dame Grand Cross of the Royal Order of Kalākaua I.

== Ancestry ==
Ancestors of Bernice Pauahi Bishop

8. Kalaniulumoku
4. Kalanihelemaiiluna Pākī
9. Kalanikauiokikilo
2. Abner Pākī
10. Kalaniwahikapaa
5. Kuhoʻoheiheipahu Kawao
11. Muolehua
1. Bernice Pauahi Bishop
6. Pauli Kaōleiokū
13. Kānekapōlei
3. Laura Kōnia
14. Haʻo
7. Kahailiopua Luahine
15. Kailipakalua

== Bibliography ==
- Kanahele, George S. (1999). Emma: Hawaii's Remarkable Queen. Honolulu: University of Hawaii Press. ISBN 978-0-8248-2240-8. OCLC 40890919.
- Kanahele, George S. (2002) [1986]. Pauahi: The Kamehameha Legacy. Honolulu: Kamehameha Schools Press. ISBN 978-0-87336-005-0. OCLC 173653971.
- Krout, Mary Hannah (1908). The Memoirs of Hon. Bernice Pauahi Bishop. New York: The Knickerbocker Press. OCLC 4683252.
- Kuykendall, Ralph Simpson (1953). The Hawaiian Kingdom 1854–1874, Twenty Critical Years. Vol. 2. Honolulu: University of Hawaii Press. ISBN 978-0-87022-432-4. OCLC 47010821.
- Kuykendall, Ralph Simpson (1967). The Hawaiian Kingdom 1874–1893, The Kalakaua Dynasty. Vol. 3. Honolulu: University of Hawaii Press. ISBN 978-0-87022-433-1. OCLC 500374815.
- Liliuokalani (1898). Hawaii's Story by Hawaii's Queen, Liliuokalani. Boston: Lee and Shepard. ISBN 978-0-548-22265-2. OCLC 2387226.
