= Kamehameha =

Kamehameha may refer to:

== House of Kamehameha ==
- House of Kamehameha, the dynasty of the Hawaiian Kings
  - Kamehameha I (1736–1819), first king of the Hawaiian Islands
  - Kamehameha II (1797–1824), second king of the Kingdom of Hawaii
  - Kamehameha III (1813–1854), King of Hawaii from 1825 to 1854
  - Kamehameha IV (1834–1863), fourth king of Hawaii from 1855 to 1863
  - Kamehameha V (1830–1872), reigned as monarch of the Kingdom of Hawaiʻi from 1863 to 1872
- Albert Kamehameha (1858–1862), crown prince of Hawaii
- David Kamehameha (1828–1835), member of the royal family of the Kingdom of Hawaii

== Other uses ==
- Kamehameha (Dragon Ball), a fictional technique mainly used by Son Goku, Son Gohan, and Master Roshi in the Dragon Ball franchise
- Kamehameha Highway, one of the main highways in Oʻahu
- Kamehameha Schools, private school system in Hawaiʻi
- Kamehameha Day, public holiday in Hawaii on June 11
- Fort Kamehameha, former United States Army military base
- King Kamehameha (horse) (foaled 2001), Japanese Thoroughbred racehorse and sire
- USS Kamehameha (SSBN-642), Benjamin Franklin-class ballistic missile submarine
- Kamehameha butterfly, a species of butterfly endemic to Hawaii
