= Kīnaʻu =

Queen consort of Hawai'i (d. 1839)

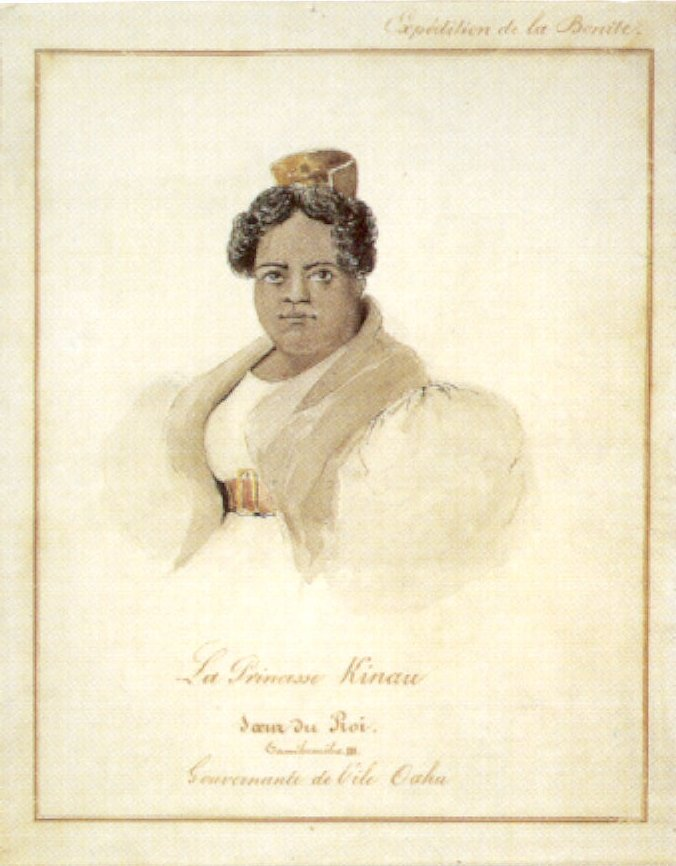

Queen consort of Hawaiʻi
- Tenure: 1819–1824

Regent of Hawaiʻi
- Tenure: June 5, 1832 – March 15, 1833
- Predecessor: Kaʻahumanu
- Successor: Kaʻahumanu III

Kuhina Nui of the Hawaiʻian Islands
- Tenure: June 5, 1832 – April 4, 1839
- Predecessor: Kaʻahumanu
- Successor: Kaʻahumanu III
- Born: c. 1805; Waikiki, Oʻahu
- Died: April 4, 1839 (aged 33–34); Honolulu, Oʻahu
- Burial: June 7, 1839; October 30, 1865; Mauna ʻAla Royal Mausoleum
- Spouse: Kamehameha II; Kahalaiʻa Luanuʻu; Mataio Kekūanaōʻa
- Issue: David Kamehameha; Moses Kekūāiwa; Lot Kapuāiwa, King Kamehameha V Alexander Liholiho, King Kamehameha IV; Victoria Kamāmalu Kaʻahumanu IV
Names
- Kalani Ahumanu i Kaliko o Iwi Kauhipua o Kīnaʻu, Elizabeth Kīnaʻu Kaʻahumanu II
- House: Kamehameha
- Father: Kamehameha I Kaweloʻokalani (hānai)
- Mother: Kalākua Kaheiheimālie; Peleuli (hānai)

Princess Kalani Ahumanu i Kaliko o Iwi Kauhipua o Kīnaʻu, also known as Elizabeth Kīnaʻu (c. 1805 – April 4, 1839) was Kuhina Nui of the Kingdom of Hawaiʻi as Kaʻahumanu II, queen regent and dowager queen.

== Life ==
Her father was King Kamehameha I and her mother was Kalākua Kaheiheimālie. She was born probably in 1805 on the island of Oʻahu at Waikiki. She was given in hānai to her stepmother Peleuli and her second husband Kawelookalani, her father's half-brother. Peleuli named her Kīnaʻu after her son Kahōʻanokū Kīnaʻu (her half-brother) and took her back to the island of Hawaiʻi after Kamehameha moved his capital back to Kailua-Kona.

Kīnaʻu was first married to her half-brother Liholiho (1797–1824) who ascended in 1819 as King Kamehameha II. In 1824, at around 19 years of age, she became Dowager Queen when Kamehameha II died in London with his favorite wife, Queen Kamāmalu, who was also their sister.

Her second husband was Kahalaiʻa Luanuʻu, a grandson of Kamehameha I. She had a son who perished along with his father in the whooping cough epidemic of 1826. Her third husband was Mataio Kekūanaōʻa (1791–1868), from 1827. Queen Kaʻahumanu was furious over their union because of his inferior rank and her wish that she married Kamehameha III in accordance with their father's wish that his children by Keōpūolani would continue his line with his children by Kaheiheimālie. Kekūanaōʻa was governor of Oʻahu (1834–1868). To him she bore four sons: David Kamehameha (1828–1835), Moses Kekūāiwa (1829–1848), Lot Kapuāiwa (1830–1872), and Alexander Liholiho (1834–1863), and one daughter Victoria Kamāmalu (1838–1866).

She became the Kuhina Nui (an office somewhat like prime minister or co-regent) styled as Kaʻahumanu II June 5, 1832, when Queen Kaʻahumanu died. She acted as the regent for her brother Kauikeaouli when he became King Kamehameha III, from June 5, 1832, to March 15, 1833. She ruled with him until her death. She was responsible for enforcing Hawaiʻi's first penal code, proclaimed by the king in 1835. She adopted Protestant Christianity like many of the chiefs and chiefesses. She persecuted many of the Catholic missionaries and tried to expel the French Jesuit priests, which would later lead into diplomatic troubles with France.

During the early years of Kamehameha III, he was seen to be indifferent to his duties as king and spend his time pursuing leisure instead of ruling, according to the missionaries. She felt she had to take full duty of a monarch, but soon became disheartened and at length came to Laura Fish Judd, the wife of Gerrit P. Judd, and said: "I am in sore straits and heavy hearted, and I have come to tell you my thought. I am quite discouraged and cannot bear this burden any longer. I wish to throw away my rank and title and responsibility together, bring my family here, and live with you; or, we will take our families and go away together." Mrs. Judd referred her to the story of Esther, and pointed out to her that she must be strong and accept the responsibility of Regent of the nation for the sake of her people.

Kīnaʻu and Kamehameha III argued over government policies. Kīnaʻu favored the policies recommended by the missionaries and was not as tolerant of other religions as her predecessor, Kaʻahumanu. She strengthened the land tenure of the Crown Lands by written and official proclamation. Kamehameha III resented the lessened power of the king who no longer had sole power to give and take land at will. He wanted the old ways for his people. Eventually they resolved their differences and formed a new government. Now there was a King, a Kuhina Nui, and a Counsel of Chiefs.

Her two sons from her third husband who had survived to adulthood ascended as kings of Hawaiʻi: the younger Alexander Liholiho as Kamehameha IV and then Lot Kapuāiwa as Kamehameha V. Her only daughter Victoria Kamāmalu became Kuhina Nui as Kaʻahumanu IV.

Her widower, Mataio Kekūanaōʻa, became Kuhina Nui from 1863 until August 24, 1864, the last holder of that position when it was dissolved by the 1864 Constitution of the Kingdom of Hawaiʻi.

Kaʻahumanu II died of the mumps at Honolulu, Oʻahu on April 4, 1839. Her funeral was held on July 7 at Kawaiahaʻo Church and she was buried in the Pohukaina Mausoleum on the grounds of ʻIolani Palace. British Admiral Edward Belcher attended and described her funeral in detail.

Her remains were later transported along with those of other royals in a midnight torchlight procession on October 30, 1865, to the newly constructed Mauna ʻAla Royal Mausoleum up in the Nuʻuanu Valley.

== Family tree ==
Kamehameha family tree

Kalaniʻōpuʻu (k)	Kalola (w)	Keōua (k)	Kekuʻiapoiwa II (w)	Kānekapōlei (w)
Kīwalaʻō	Kekuiapoiwa Liliha
Keōpūolani	Kamehameha I (The Great) (died 1819)	Kalākua Kaheiheimālie	Kaʻahumanu (1819–1832)
Liholiho; Kamehameha II (1819–1824)	Kamāmalu	Keouawahine	Pauli Kaʻōleiokū _{*Paternity is in question as daughter and mother both claim Kalaniopuu as the father.}	Kahailiopua; Luahine
Kauikeaouli; Kamehameha III (1825–1854)	Kalama	Elizabeth Kīnaʻu; Kaʻahumanu II	Mataio; Kekūanaōʻa	Pauahi	Laura Kōnia	Abner Pākī
Keaweaweʻulaokalani I	Keaweaweʻulaokalani II
Queen Emma	Alexander Liholiho; Kamehameha IV (1854–1863)	Lot Kapuāiwa; Kamehameha V (1863–1872)	Victoria Kamāmalu; Kaʻahumanu IV (1855–1863)	Ruth Keʻelikōlani	Charles Reed; Bishop	Bernice Pauahi; Bishop
Albert Kamehameha	John William Pitt Kīnaʻu	Keolaokalani Davis

== Bibliography ==
- Belcher, Edward (1843). Narrative Of A Voyage Round The World, Performed In Her Majesty's Ship Sulphur, During The Years 1836-1842, Including Details Of The Naval Operations In China. London: Henry Colburn, Publisher. pp. 260–263.
- Kamakau, Samuel (1992) [1961]. Ruling Chiefs of Hawaii (Revised ed.). Honolulu: Kamehameha Schools Press. ISBN 0-87336-014-1.

Royal titles
Preceded by Queen Kaʻahumanu	Queen Regent of Hawaiʻi; June 5, 1832 – March 17, 1833	Succeeded by none
Preceded by Queen Kaʻahumanu	Kuhina Nui of the Hawaiʻian Islands; June 5, 1832 – April 4, 1839	Succeeded by Kaʻahumanu III
