= Keʻelikōlani =

Primary heir to the Kamehameha family of the Kingdom of Hawaiʻi (1826–1883)

- The Honorable
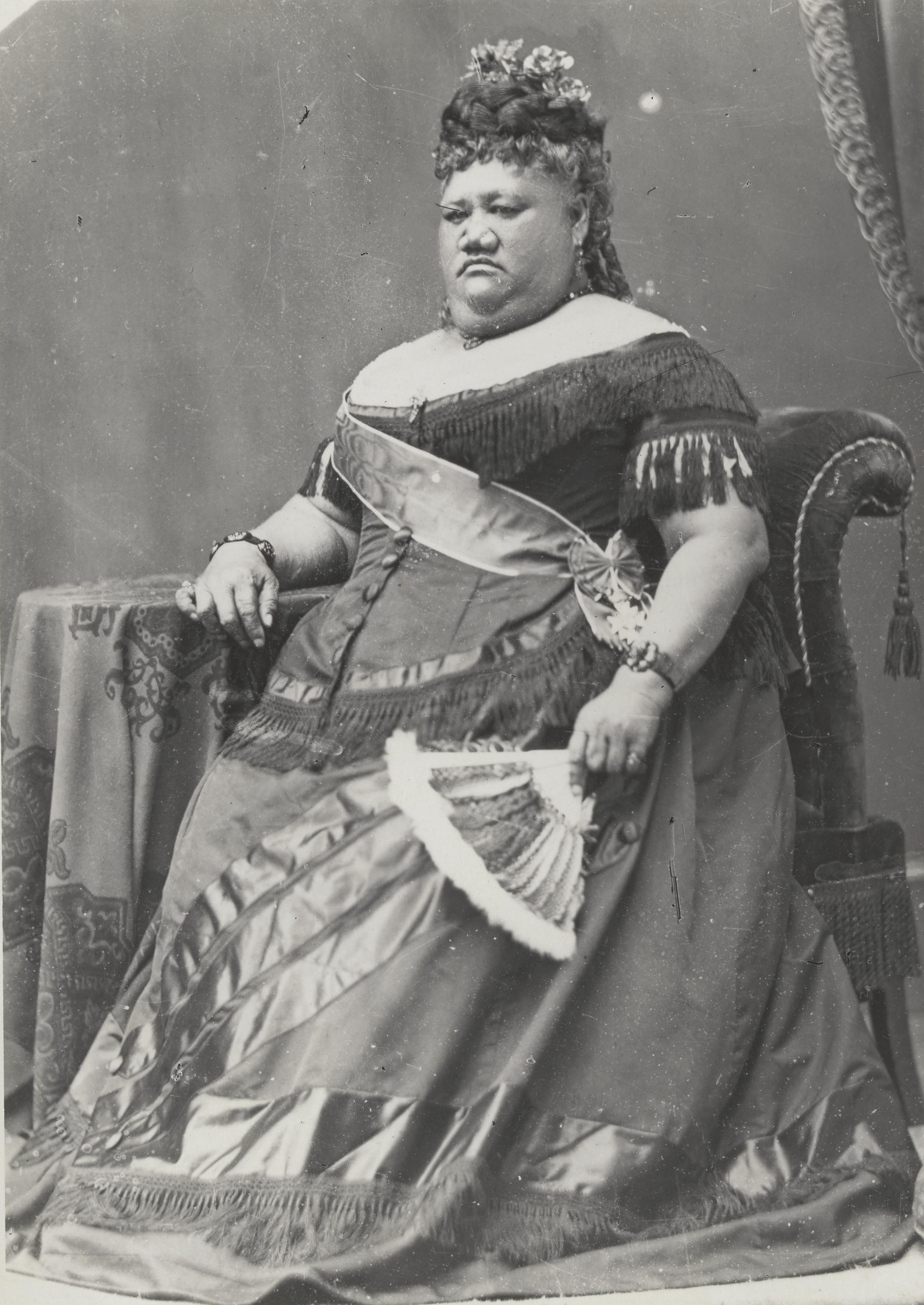
- Keʻelikōlani in 19th-century photograph
- Born: June 17, 1826; Honolulu, Oʻahu, Kingdom of Hawaiʻi
- Died: May 24, 1883 (aged 56); Kailua-Kona, Hawaiʻi, Kingdom of Hawaiʻi
- Burial: June 17, 1883; Mauna ʻAla Royal Mausoleum
- Spouse: William Pitt Leleiohoku I Isaac Young Davis
- Issue: John William Pitt Kīnaʻu; Keolaokalani Pākī Bishop; William Pitt Leleiohoku II (hānai)
Names
- Ruth Luka Keanolani Kauanahoahoa Keʻelikōlani
- House: Kamehameha
- Father: Mataio Kekūanaōʻa
- Mother: Kalani Pauahi

Ruth Ke‘elikōlani, or sometimes written as Luka Ke‘elikōlani, also known as Ruth Ke‘elikōlani Keanolani Kanāhoahoa or Ruth Keanolani Kanāhoahoa Ke‘elikōlani (June 17, 1826 (Note: According to Kristin Zambucka, scholars such as John Papa ʻĪʻī and Alexander Spoehr both agree on June 17, 1826, however Noel Kent believes the date to be on February 9, 1826, a date Keʻelikōlani seemed to celebrate herself.) – May 24, 1883), was a member of the House of Kamehameha who served as Governor of the Island of Hawaiʻi and for a period, was the largest and wealthiest landowner in the Hawaiian Islands. Keʻelikōlani's genealogy is controversial. Her mother's identity is not disputed, while her grandfather Pauli Kaōleiokū's relationship to Kamehameha I is. While her father was legally identified as early as 1864, disputes to that lineage continued as late as 1919. As one of the primary heirs to the Kamehameha family, Ruth held much of the land that would become the Bernice Pauahi Bishop Estate, funding the Kamehameha Schools.

Her name Keʻelikōlani means leaf bud of heaven.

== Early life ==
Keʻelikōlani's mother was Kalani Pauahi who died on June 17, 1826, during childbirth after having married the man believed to be her father, Mataio Kekūanaōʻa on November 28, 1825. She was born at Pohukaina near the ʻIolani Palace and hānai adopted by Kaʻahumanu

=== Maternal lineage ===
Kalani Pauahi was the daughter of Pauli Kaōleiokū and Keouawahine. Kaōleiokū was one of the three sons of Kānekapōlei who rebelled against their half brother Kīwalaʻō and their uncle Kamehameha I when their father Kalaniʻōpuʻu died and left them no lands. The other two brothers were Keōua Kūʻahuʻula who started the rebellion and Keōua Peʻeʻale, who was speared to death. It was said that Kalani Pauahi was Kamehameha I's granddaughter through her father Kaōleiokū However, in 1935 the Hawaiian Historical Society published their Forty-Third Annual Report with an article by archaeologist John F. G. Stokes "Kaoleioku, Paternity and Biographical Sketch", in which Stokes claimed that Pauli Kaōleiokū was not a son of Kamehameha l.

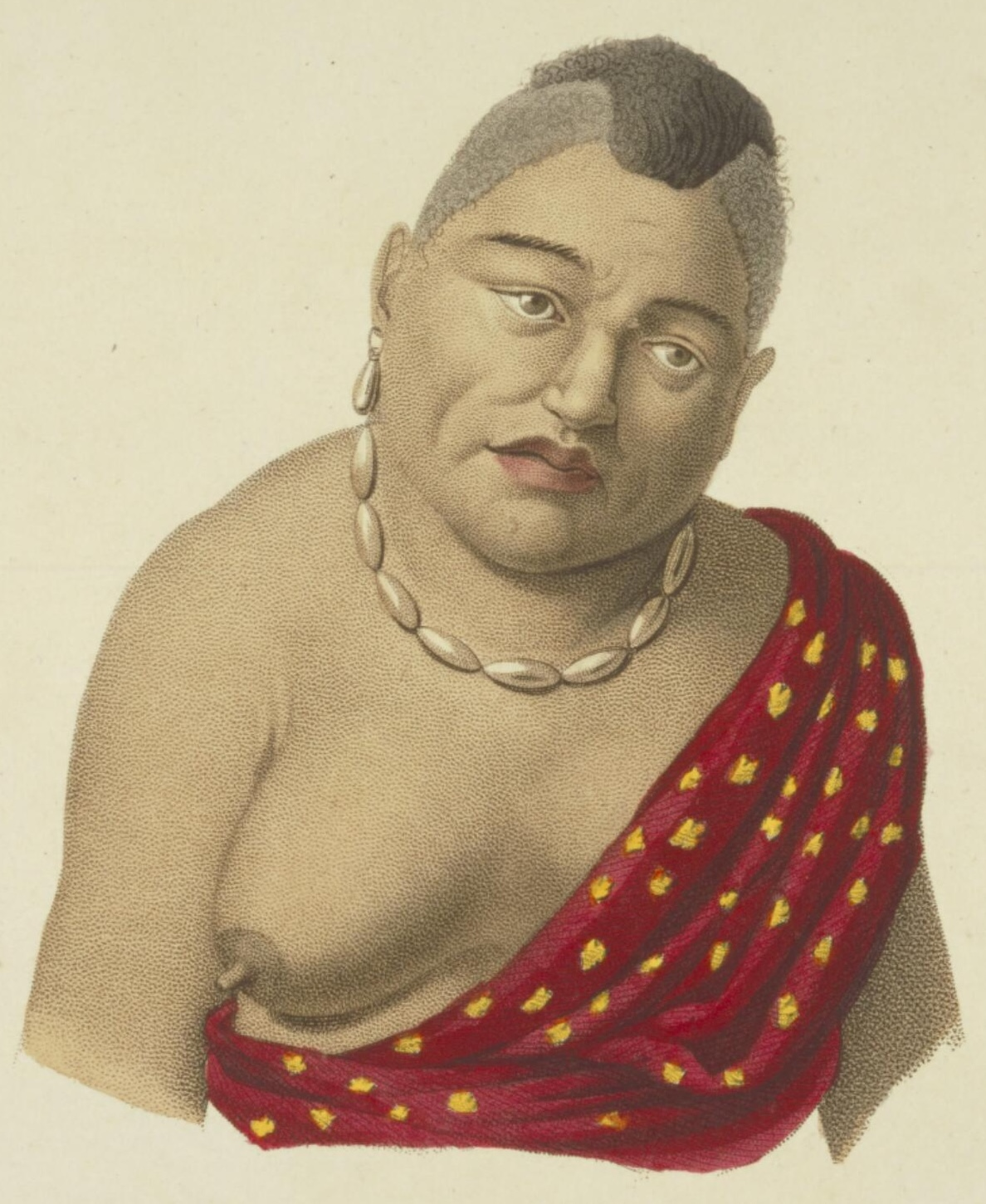
Keʻelikōlani's grandmother Keouawahine's portrait entitled "Kéohoua, femme du chef Kaïroua" by Alphonse Pellion. From "Voyage autour du Monde, 1817-1820" by Louis Claude Desaulses de Freycinet

Kalani Pauahi's mother Keouawahine was a daughter of Kauhiwawaeono, whose parents were Kekauhiwamoku and Haalou. Haalou was a daughter of Haae-a-Mahi who was also the father of Kamehameha I's mother Kekuʻiapoiwa II.

Kalani Pauahi died from complications due to child birth. While many sources and writers differ on the date and reason, Francisco de Paula Marín noted in his journal in 1826 the day Kalani Puahi died; "17 June. Today died one of the Queens Craypaguaji (Kalanipauahi i.e., Pauahi)". Some years later John Papa ʻĪʻī wrote; "The mother died in childbirth on June 17, 1826", a date that anthropologist Alexander Spoehr agrees with. However professor Noel Kent gave the date of Keʻelikōlani's birth as February 9, 1826, a four-month difference. According to Kristin Zambucka author of: "The High Chiefess, Ruth Keelikolani" this was a date Keʻelikōlani supposedly celebrated herself. Professor Seth Archer in his 2018 publication; "Sharks upon the Land: Colonialism, Indigenous Health, and Culture in Hawai'i" lists Pauahi among those who died of a whooping cough outbreak.

=== Paternal ancestry ===
Keʻelikōlani's genealogy was disputed as late as 1919. She is sometimes considered to be of poʻolua ancestry, a child of two fathers.

==== Kahalaiʻa ====
While Keʻelikōlani was the half sister of Kamehameha V, he had always considered her the daughter of Kahalaiʻa, a nephew of Kamehameha I, the son of the king's half-brother Kalaʻimamahu and Kahakuhaʻakoi Wahinepio from Maui. Kahalaiʻa was a kahu (royal attendant) for Kamehameha II. Zambucka states that Kahalaiʻa was caring for Kalani Pauahi while her first husband, Kamehameha II, was in England. According to Samuel Mānaiakalani Kamakau, Kalani Pauahi and Kamehamalu, both wives of Kamehameha II, fell in love with him. Kamakau states: "Liholiho had once entertained the notion of disposing of Kahala-iʻa as Kamehameha had of Ka-niho-nui". In Kamakau's version both Pauahi and Kinaʻu were with Kahalaiʻa when the king and queen's remains returned in 1825 and that; "Within a few years Pauahi became the wife of Keku-anaoʻa, and Kinaʻu of Kahala-iʻa. Pauahi was carrying Ruth Ke-ʻeli-kolani at the time, and that is why Ruth was said to be "double headed" (poʻokua) > that is, a child of two fathers".

In May 1824 Kaumualiʻi, the aliʻi nui or "supreme ruler" of Kauaʻi died. Not long afterwards Hiram Bingham I, while on the island, announced that a solar eclipse would occur on June 26 at exactly 12:57 pm. Bingham had hoped to use the event to explain it as a simple act of nature and not an omen. Many still saw it as a sign of impending war. Kahalaiʻa was appointed governor of the Island of Kauai and took command of the Russian fort with its fifty mounted canons and ordered armed guards to the tops of its walls. On August 8, 1824, the day after Kalanimoku held a failed council to annex the island, those dissatisfied with the land disbursement went to war. By the wars end Kahalaiʻa had been replaced as governor by Kaikioewa. After he was replaced, Kahalaiʻa returned to Honolulu and was made kahu hānai of Kauikeaoūli (Kamehameha III). John Papa ʻĪʻī states Kahalaiʻa was sent to Lahaina, Maui for his safety upon Kekūanaōʻa's return as he had supposedly already stated his intention to wed Pauahi.

In 1909 Sheldon Dibble published the date of Kahalaiʻa's death as 1826 however, he places Pauahi's death in 1825. Also in 1906, Thomas G. Thrum's; "Hawaiian Annual" lists Kahalaiʻa's death as 1826 as well however, in their 1922 edition state that Kahalaiʻa had died during the battle. (Note: "Consequent upon the rebellion of George Kaumualii, in which Kahalaia was killed, Kaikioewa, an aged chief of high rank, a warrior with Kalanimoku under Kamehameha, headed a body of men from Maui...") John Fawcett Pogue published an account of the rebellion written by Hawaiian students in his book Moolelo of Ancient Hawaii in 1858. In 2002 Peter R. Mills clarified translations and conclusions from Charles W. Kenn about the writings in which Kenn describes a "sacrifice" interpreted as relating to Kahalaiʻa. Mills noted that the figure had not died during the battle and was not buried at the fort. Archer believed that Kahalaiʻa died of whooping cough in an outbreak in 1826 along with Kalani Pauahi. Kamakau mentions an outbreak of "cough and bronchitis" that killed Pauahi and others and then discusses Kalanimoku and Kahalaiʻa's death, but not how they died. Kamakau only mentions that Boki took over as the young king's kahu after Kahalaiʻa's death.

==== Kekūanaōʻa ====
John Papa ʻĪʻī writes that, whether or not Kekūanaōʻa had spoken of Pauahi before leaving for England, it was common knowledge that Kekūanaōʻa had taken Kalani Pauahi for himself immediately upon his return. ʻĪʻī states that the relationship may possibly have stemmed from "illicit relations" prior to the king's death that remained hidden, but on Kekūanaōʻa's return the "affair was evident".

Although her paternity was questionable, Mataio Kekūanaōʻa claimed her as his own natural child. He took her into his household after Kaʻahumanu's death and included her in his will and inheritance. This made her the half-sister of King Kamehameha IV and King Kamehameha V and Princess Victoria Kamāmalu.

=== Kaʻahumanu, Boki and the line of succession ===
A dispute between Boki and Kaʻahumanu began in 1829 over the line of succession when a discussion overheard between the Queen-Regent Kaʻahumanu and Kekāuluohi was relayed to Boki by a royal attendant. Kaʻahumanu had said that Keʻelikōlani could become ruler. Kaʻahumanu believed Kaōleiokū to be Kamehameha's first child, and as Pauahi was his daughter, Keʻelikōlani was grandniece of Kauikeaouli. Kamakau says this is when Boki conceived plans to overthrow Kaʻahumanu. On June 20 Boki visited with Nāhiʻenaʻena and Kamehameha III and advised the king and his sister to conceive a child in order to disqualify any claims saying; "the chiefs would not dare urge your grandniece as your possible successor!" and then told the king what the attendant had said. When Kaʻahumanu and other's including Kuakini and Hoapili were told of Boki's actions they had harsh words toward Boki calling him; "[T]he one girdled in Kamehameha's intestines", a reference to Kahekili II's hatred towards the king and Boki's rumored paternity. They stated that Kaʻahumanu had a right to decide such things but he did not. This only infuriated the young man who believed himself to be Kauikeaouli's main kahu or guardian, giving him the sole right to counsel the king as tradition had always given past guardians. Boki was held in high esteem by American and English consuls and felt encouraged in quartering soldiers, including some foreign white settlers, guns and ammunitions in Waikiki. When news of the rebellion reached Kaʻahumanu, most of the soldiers stayed with Boki, but members of the church and others came to her aid. Kaʻahumanu was defiant and said that Boki would have to come there himself to kill her and her grandchildren, Keʻelikōlani and David Kamehameha. After hearing about Boki's purpose Charles Kanaʻina and Kekūanaōʻa headed out on horseback to confront Boki, but Kanaʻina became nervous and turned back, leaving Keʻelikōlani's father Kekūanaōʻa to continue alone. He arrived to a huge gathering of armed people, including Boki and his men. When the crowd saw Kekūanaōʻa they shouted his name and fell silent. He took Boki off to speak with him about his plans to kill Kaʻahumanu. Boki admitted his jealousy of the queen's sway over Kamehameha III but was persuaded to end the dispute and return to his home peacefully.

==== Line of succession by Order in Council with Kamehameha III ====
On June 29, 1844, an "Order in Council of His Majesty King Kamehameha III" designated the 15 eligible royals with rights to the throne. This pool of individuals became presumed heirs in the absence of a constitutional appointment of a successor to the throne. A full list with one additional name was printed in 1847 by the Polynesian, the official government journal; Moses Kekuaiwa, Jane Loeau, Alexander Liholiho, Abigail Maheha, James Kaliokalani, Mary Paaaina, David Kalakaua, Lydia Kamakaeha, Lot Kamehameha, Bernice Pauahi, William C. Lunalilo, Elizabeth Kekaaniau, Peter Y. Kaeo, Emma Rooke, William Kinau Pitt, and Victoria Kamamalu. Keʻelikōlani was not included in this line of succession, although her son was.

== Defender of tradition ==
Ruth was a defender of ancient Hawaiian traditions and customs. While the kingdom became Christianized, Anglicized, and urbanized, she preferred to live as a noblewoman of antiquity. While her royal estates were filled with elegant palaces and mansions built for her family, she chose to live in a large traditional stone-raised grass house. While she was fluent in English, she used the Hawaiian language exclusively, requiring English-speakers to use a translator. Although trained in the Christian religion and given a Christian name, she honored practices considered pagan, such as patronage of chanters and hula dancers.

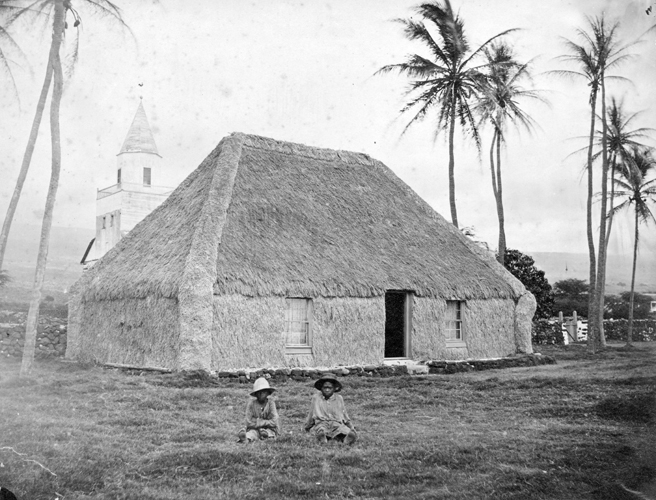
Princess Ruth's grass house that stood on the Huliheʻe Palace grounds

She continued to worship the traditional gods and various aumakua, or ancestral spirits. When Mauna Loa erupted in 1880, threatening the city of Hilo with a lava flow, her intercession with the goddess Pele was credited by Hawaiians with saving the city. When the ruling monarchs asked her to pose for official photographs, she often refused. Only a dozen photographs of Ruth are known to exist.

Considered a beauty in her youth, she gained weight as she grew older, and a surgery for nasal infection disfigured her nose, although rumors circulated that it was her second husband Davis who had broken her nose in one of their many fights. She adopted some modern ways, such as Victorian fashions in hairstyle and dresses. Christian missionaries caused Hawaiian royal women to become self-conscious about their Hawaiian looks. They were uncomfortable with their dark skin and large bodies that had been considered signs of nobility for centuries. No matter how Westernized their manners, they were seen as a "Hawaiian squaw". By the last half of the 19th century, Hawaiian women were going in two different directions. Many European men married Hawaiian women they found exotic, favoring those who were thin and had pale complexions.

Ruth defied this ideal, weighing 440 pounds (200 kg) and standing over 6 feet (1.8 m) tall. Her broad features were accentuated by a nose flattened by surgery for an infection. To add to her stature, listeners described Princess Ruth's voice as a "distant rumble of thunder." The U.S. minister to Hawaiʻi Henry A. Peirce dismissed the princess as a "woman of no intelligence or ability". Many Westerners interpreted her adamant defense of traditional ways as backward and stupid.

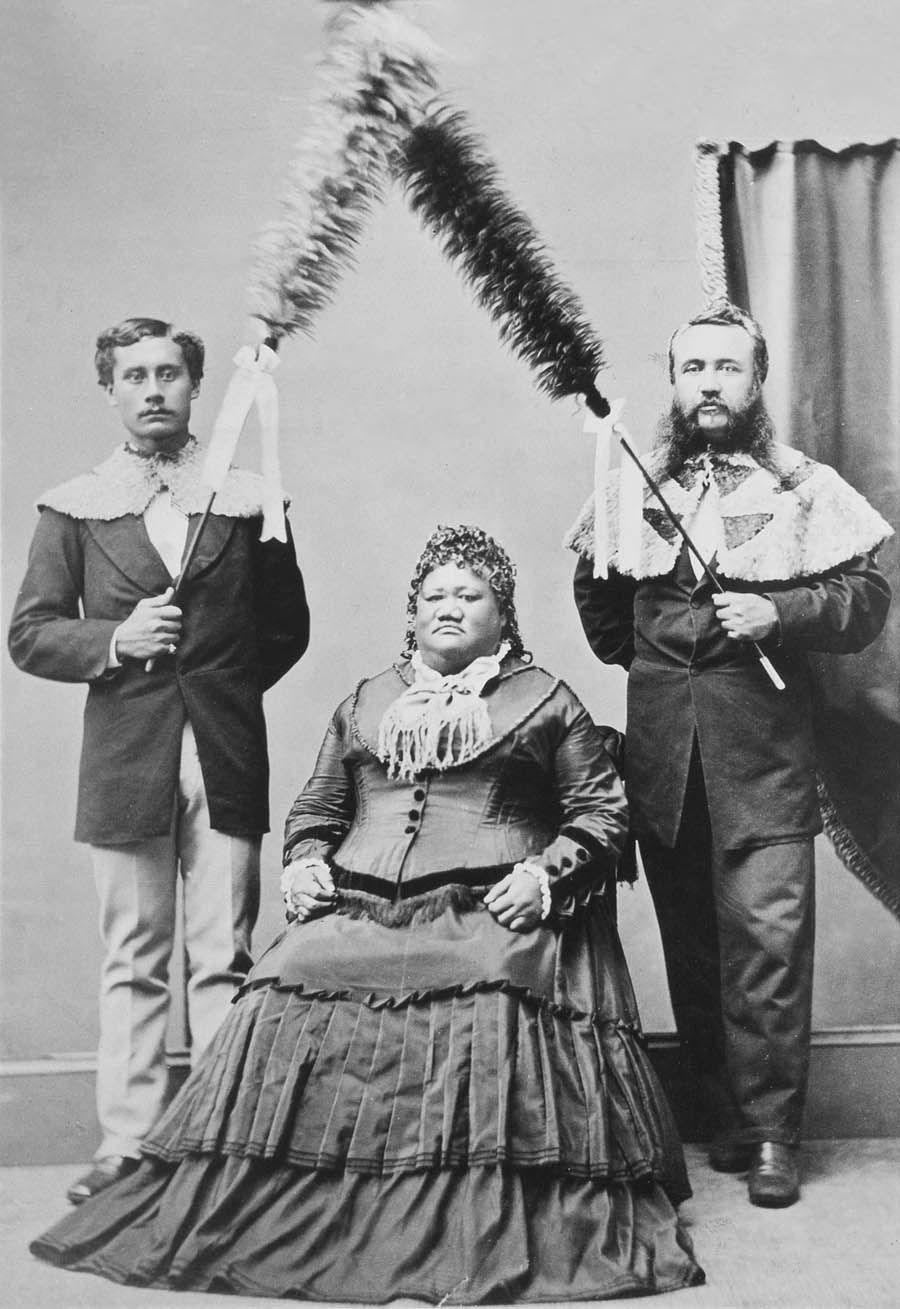
Keʻelikōlani with Sam Parker, left, and J. A. Cummins. She was an adept land trustee and administrator.

== Government and business ==
As the Governor of Hawaiʻi Island and heir to large estates, she had more political power and wealth than most women in the world. For example, American women were not allowed to vote. Ruth's assertiveness were characteristic of her ancestors. She hired businessmen such as Sam Parker and Rufus Anderson Lyman, descended from Americans, to help her adapt to the rules for land ownership. Instead of selling the land, she offered long-term leases, which encouraged settlers to start farms, and gave her a secure income. She was a shrewd businesswoman. In a notorious case, she sold Claus Spreckels her claims to the Crown Lands for $10,000. The lands were worth $750,000, but she knew her claims to them were worthless, since previous court cases had established that the lands were entitled to the monarch.

In 1847 she was appointed to the Privy Council of Kamehameha III, and served from 1855 through 1857 in the House of Nobles. On January 15, 1855, she was appointed Royal Governor of Hawaiʻi Island, serving until March 2, 1874. When her last half-brother Kamehameha V died in 1872 leaving no heir to the throne, her controversial family background prevented her from contending to become monarch. Although she was considered a member of the royal family, along with Queen Emma and the king's father. In 1874, King Lunalilo then died, and the legislature elected Kalākaua as king, the first not to be descended from Kamehameha I. Keʻelikōlani was not declared a member of the royal family, merely as a high chiefess by Kalākaua. William Pitt Leleiohoku was named Crown prince. History might have been different had he lived past 1877 and become wealthy. Instead, the increased reliance of the royal family on the treasury and governmental pensions to fund their expenses is a factor that led to the overthrow of the Kingdom of Hawaii in 1893.

She died at Huliheʻe Palace, Kailua Kona, Hawaiʻi Island on May 24, 1883 or possible May 15. Her body was shipped to Honolulu for a royal funeral, and she was buried in the Kamehameha Crypt of the Royal Mausoleum, Mauna ʻAla, in Nuʻuanu Valley, Oahu. Her will had one major bequest: to her cousin Princess Bernice Pauahi Bishop the elaborate mansion, Keōua Hale on Emma Street in Honolulu, as well as approximately 353,000 acres (1,430 km^{2}) of Kamehameha lands. This totaled nearly nine percent of the land in the main Hawaiian Islands.

== Personal life and marriages ==
Before reaching sixteen, she married High Chief William Pitt Leleiohoku I (1821–1848), Governor of Hawaiʻi, former husband of Princess Nāhiʻenaʻena, and son of High Chief William Pitt Kalanimoku (the Prime Minister of Kamehameha I) and his first wife, High Chiefess Kiliwehi. Her 27-year-old husband soon died in a measles epidemic.

On June 2, 1856, she married her second husband, Isaac Young Davis (c. 1826–1882), son of George Hueu Davis and his wife Kahaʻanapilo Papa (therefore grandson of Isaac Davis). Standing at 6 ft 2 in, he was considered handsome by many including foreign visitors such as Lady Franklin and her niece Sophia Cracroft. Their marriage was an unhappy one, and they divorced in 1868 possibly over the early loss of their son.

=== Children ===
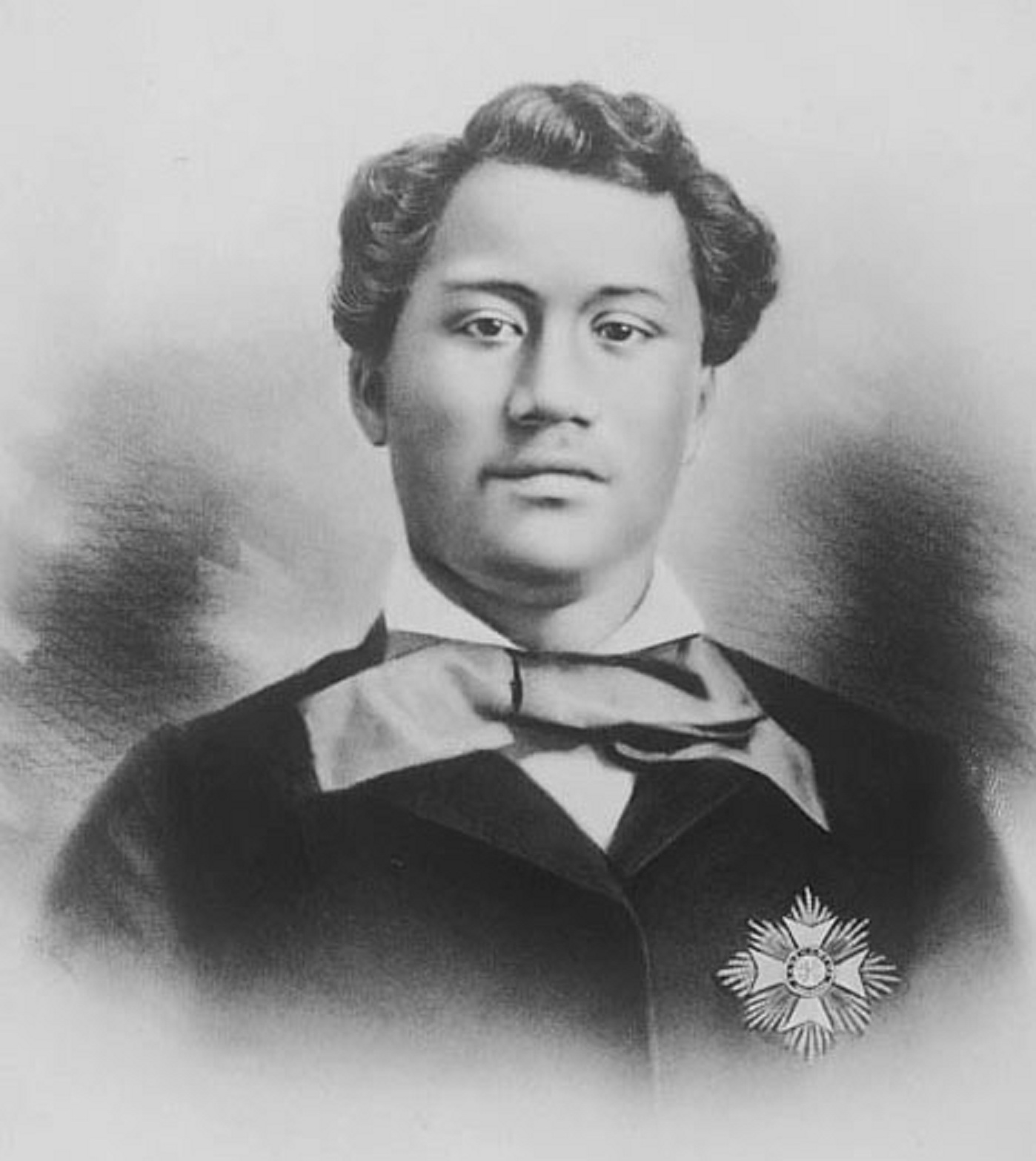
John William Pitt Kīnaʻu

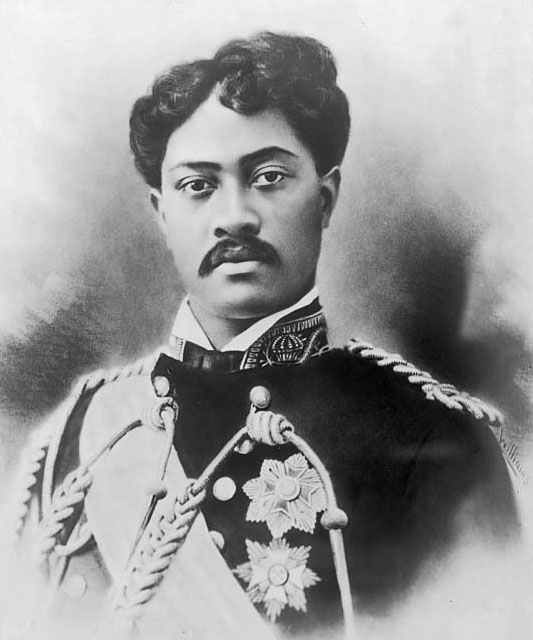
William Pitt Leleiohoku

She bore two sons, who both died young. John William Pitt Kīnaʻu, son of Leleiohoku, was born on December 21, 1842. He was taken away at an early age to attend the Royal School in Honolulu, and died September 9, 1859. Keolaokalani Davis, son of Isaac Young Davis was born in February 1862 and hānai (adopted) against his father's wishes to Princess Bernice Pauahi Bishop. He died on August 29, 1863, aged one year and 6 months.

Her adopted son Leleiohoku II was born January 10, 1854. He became Crown Prince of Hawaii, but died April 9, 1877, at age 23. On his death, she demanded that Kalākaua and his family relinquish all rights to the estates she had bequeathed their brother, and that they be returned to her by deed. Her relations with King Kalākaua were distant, although she had close friendships with his sister, Queen Liliʻuokalani, and their mother, Keohokalole.

She was godmother to Princess Kaʻiulani. At Kaʻiulani's baptism, Ruth gifted 10 acres (40,000 m^{2}) of her land in Waikīkī where Kaʻiulani's father Archibald Cleghorn built the ʻĀinahau Estate. Kaʻiulani gave Ruth the pen name of Mama Nui meaning "great mother". Ruth insisted that the princess be raised to one day be fit to sit on the Hawaiian throne. Ruth's death in 1883 was the first of many deaths that Kaʻiulani witnessed in her short life.

=== Personal heir to the Kamehameha line ===
Keʻelikōlani was an heir to many in the Kamehameha Dynasty despite her controversial heritage. She was entitled to much of the land holdings of her adopted mother Kaʻahumanu through her father who inherited his daughter's holdings, which then passed to Keʻelikōlani. She was the sole heir of Kamehameha V and a 1/9 heir to the estate of Charles Kanaʻina's estate along with her cousin Bernice who inherited two - 1/9th shares because her genealogy.

== Legacy ==
During her life Ruth was considered the wealthiest woman in the islands.. Her estate passed to her cousin Bernice Pauahi Bishop, with much of these lands becoming the endowment for Kamehameha Schools. On these lands downtown Honolulu, Hickam Air Force Base, part of Honolulu International Airport, Moana Hotel, Princess Kaʻiulani Hotel, Royal Hawaiian Hotel, among others, were built.

A documentary film was made of her life in 2004. As a tribute to her traditionalism, a version of the film was produced in the Hawaiian language. In March 2017, Hawaiʻi Magazine ranked her among a list of the most influential women in Hawaiian history.

== Ancestry ==
Keʻelikōlani family tree

**Key- Subjects with bold titles and blue bold box= Aliʻi line. Bold title and grey bolded box= Lower ranking Aliʻi line. Bold title and un-bolded box= European nobility. Regular name and box= makaʻāinana or untitled foreign subject**.

**Kanaina**

?

**Pupuka (k)** (Note: ""Pupuka, an Oahu chief of considerable importance, was father of Inaina, the wife of Nahiolea, and mother of Kekūanaōʻa, late governor of Oahu".) (Note: Kūhiō Geneology located at the Hawaii State Archives, #38, page 7 shows Kahoowaha and Pupuka as the parents of Inaina.)	**Kahoʻowaha** (w)	**Kalaniʻōpuʻu**	**Kānekapōlei**
**Kiʻilaweau** (k)	**Inaina** (w)	**Pauli Kaōleiokū** (c. 1767–1818)	**Keouawahine** (w)
**Kekūanaōʻa** (c. 1791 – November 24, 1868)	**Kalani Pauahi** (w) (c.1804 – June 17, 1826)
**William Pitt Leleiohoku I** (March 31, 1821 – October 21, 1848)	**Ruth Keʻelikōlani** (February 9/June 17, 1826 (Note: According to Kristin Zambucka, Keʻelikōlani considered her Birthday to be on February 9, 1826 but scholars such as John Papa ʻĪʻī and Alexander Spoehr both agree on June 17, 1826.) – May 24, 1883) (Note: In an issue of; "The Friend", July, 1883. The journal notes the obituary and funeral of Keʻelikōlani. The funeral was prepared by S.M. Damon.)	**Isaac Young Davis** (Note: "Isaac Young Davis, a grandson and one of nineteen children, was the second husband of Princess Ruth".) (c. 1826 – June 16, (Note: "June 16, Today departed this life Isaac Young Davis, aged about 60, a grandson of Isaac Davis who was made a chief by Kamehameha I.") 1882)
**John William Pitt Kinau** (Note: "Ruth, mother of William Pitt Kinau".) (December 27, 1842 – September 9, 1859) (Note: "According to Au Okoa, the coffin includes the inscription: “John William Pitt Kinau, - Born Dec 27, 1842, - Died on the 9th of Sept. 1857 [sic, should be 1859].”)	**Keolaokalani Pākī Bishop** (Note: Keolaokalani Pākī Bishop was the son of Ruth Keʻelikōlani and Isaac Young Davis but hānai adopted by Bernice Pauahi Bishop and her husband Charles Reed Bishop.) (Note: "Keelikolani's second husband was Isaac Young Davis, a grandson of Isaac Davis the sailor, who had been an adviser to Kamehameha I. A child born of this marriage was adopted by Pauahi Bishop, but died in infancy". (Note: Alfons L. Korn (1958). The Victorian Visitors. University of Hawaii Press. ISBN 978-0-87022-421-8.)) (December 30, 1862 - August 28, 1863)

**Kauhiwawaeono** (k) (Note: "From Heulu, through his son Keawe-a-Heulu, and through his three daughters, Hakau, Kalaniwahineuli, Puhipuhieli, descended Mrs. Bernice Pauahi Bishop, Princess Ruth Keelikolani, Queen Emma, and Liliuokalani".)

**Loe** (w)

Family tree notes:

== Honours ==
- Dame Grand Cross of the Royal Order of Kamehameha I.

== See also ==
- Huliheʻe Palace – Kailua-Kona home of Princess Ruth
- Keōua Hale – Palace of Princess Ruth (downtown Honolulu)
- Princess Ruth Keʻelikōlani Middle School – former palace of Keʻelikōlani

== Citations ==
Preceded by George Luther Kapeau	Royal Governor of Hawaiʻi; 1855–1874	Succeeded by Samuel Kipi
