= Kekūanaōʻa =

Kuhina Nui of the Hawaiian Islands and Governor of Oahu (c. 1791–1868)

- Kuhina Nui of the Hawaiian Islands and Governor of Oʻahu
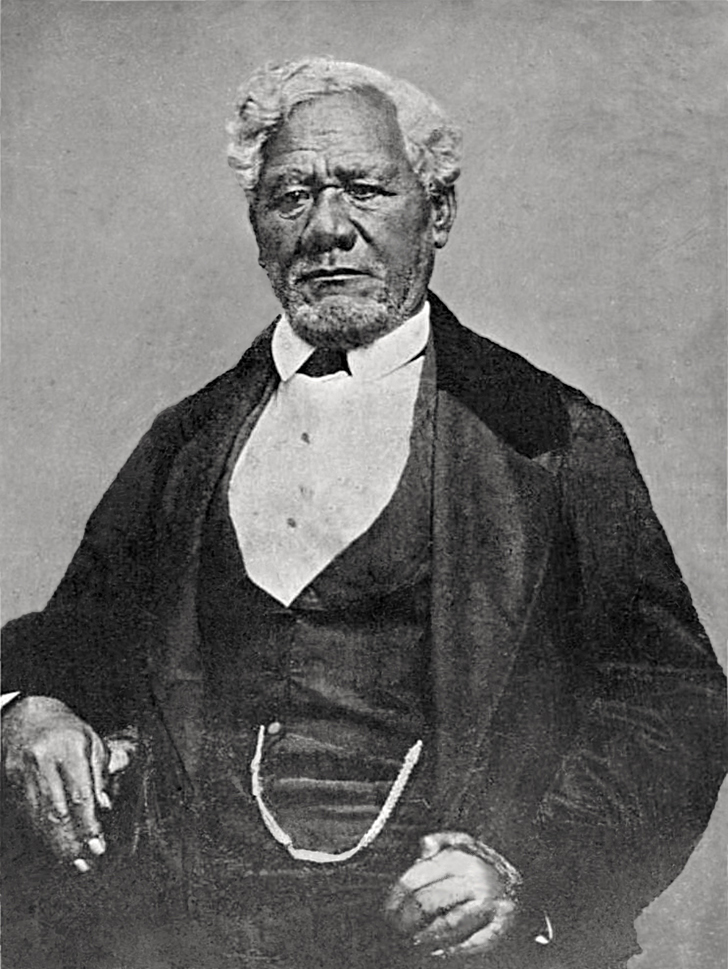

Kuhina Nui of the Hawaiian Islands
- Reign: December 21, 1863 – August 24, 1864
- Predecessor: Kaʻahumanu IV
- Successor: position abolished

Royal Governor of Oʻahu
- Reign: 1834–1868
- Predecessor: John Adams Kuakini
- Successor: John Owen Dominis
- Born: c. January 1791; Hilo
- Died: November 24, 1868 (aged 77); Pakakanene, Honolulu, Oʻahu
- Burial: December 22, 1868; Mauna ʻAla Royal Mausoleum
- Spouse: Kalehua; Pauahi; Kīnaʻu; Kaloloahilani
- Issue: Paʻalua; Ruth Keʻelikōlani (legally recognized); David Kamehameha; Moses Kekūāiwa; Lot Kapuāiwa; Alexander Liholiho; Victoria Kamāmalu
Names
- Mataio (Matthew) Keawenui Kekūanaōʻa
- House: Mahi, Moana, Kamehameha
- Father: Kiʻilaweau
- Mother: Inaina

Mataio Kekūanaōʻa (c. 1791 – November 24, 1868), formally referred to as His Honor or His Highness, was a Hawaiian politician who served as governor of the island of Oʻahu, father of two kings, Kamehameha IV and Kamehameha V, and held the office of Kuhina Nui as did his wife, Kīnaʻu and their daughter, Victoria Kamāmalu.

== Parentage and early life ==
His first name Mataio, which he adopted later in life, is the Hawaiian form of Matthew. Kekūanaōʻa translates as "the standing projection" in the Hawaiian language and refers to the masts of Western ships seen in the harbor at his birth.

Kekūanaōʻa was born sometime around the year 1791. His mother is believed to be Inaina. While an obituary at his death identified his father as Nāhiʻōleʻa, on March 14, 1879 the Hawaiian Supreme court identified Kiʻilaweau as the father of Kekuanaoa in probate using the genealogy books of the royal family, proving a legal bloodline line from Keʻelikōlani back to Kiʻilaweau's grandmother, Moana.

John Papa ʻĪʻī's uncle Nāhiʻōleʻa, the aliʻi that took Kalanikapule's side against Kamehameha I and was killed by his cousins, was listed in the newspaper Ke Au Okoa as Kekūanaōʻa's father; however, in the chant for Nakanealoha, the name of Kiʻilaweau is mentioned as a makua. This makes some believe he had two fathers, a tradition called poʻolua. Kiʻilaweau was an aliʻi of the highest rank. While Kekūanaōʻa's children were not as high ranking as Kamehameha II or Kamehameha III, Kekūanaōʻa descends from Keawehanauikawalu, the son of Lonoikamakahiki, his line was considered high-ranking.

== Political career ==
He was the Royal Governor of Oʻahu 1839–1864. On December 21, 1863 he was made the sixth Kuhina Nui, replacing his daughter who became Crown Princess and heir apparent to the throne. For most of his reign as Kuhina Nui he supported his son Kamehameha V's view of abolishing the position. He held the position until 1864 when the Constitution of 1864 abolished it. He also served as a member of the House of Nobles from 1841–1868, Privy Council 1845–1869, and as President of the Board of Education from 1860. In 1866, Mark Twain wrote of Mataio Kekūanaōʻa: "[A] man of noble presence.." and "[S]eemingly natural and fitted to the place as if he had been born to it...."

The Territorial Building in the Hawaii Capital Historic District was named for him.

== Personal life ==
Kekūanaōʻa was the punahele, or intimate companion of King Kamehameha II in his youth, and followed him to England where the King and Queen Kamāmalu died of measles in 1824. He was able to escape the sickness and return to Hawaii. On the return journey, he was baptized by the chaplain of the British warship HMS Blonde.

Back in Hawaii, he stabilizes himself in the court by marrying two wives of his late sovereign. His first marriage to Kalehua was from 1822 to 1825, and the product of this marriage was a son named Paʻaula. He married again to Pauahi, the widow of Kamehameha II. Their marriage lasted only months, from November 1825 to her death in February 1826. He is considered the father of her daughter Princess Ruth Keʻelikōlani.

He remarried Elizabeth Kīnaʻu, another Kamehameha II widow, who ruled as the Kuhina Nui at the time under the name Kaʻahumanu II. From her he fathered David Kamehameha, Moses Kekūāiwa, Lot Kapuāiwa, Alexander Liholiho, and Victoria Kamāmalu. His sons Alexander and Lot would become King Kamehameha IV and King Kamehameha V. His daughter would become the fifth Kuhina Nui as Kaʻahumanu IV. The third marriage lasted from 1827 until Kīnaʻu's death in 1839. After 6 years as a widower he remarried again in 1845, to the High Chiefess Kaloloahilani. The marriage resulted in the birth of a son on November 28, 1846.

| Preceded by John Adams Kuakini | Royal Governor of Oʻahu; 1839–1864 | Succeeded by John Owen Dominis |
| Preceded by Kaʻahumanu IV | Kuhina Nui of the Hawaiian Islands; December 21, 1863 – August 24, 1864 | Succeeded by Position Abolished |
