= Kaʻahumanu =

Queen consort of Hawaii (1768–1832)

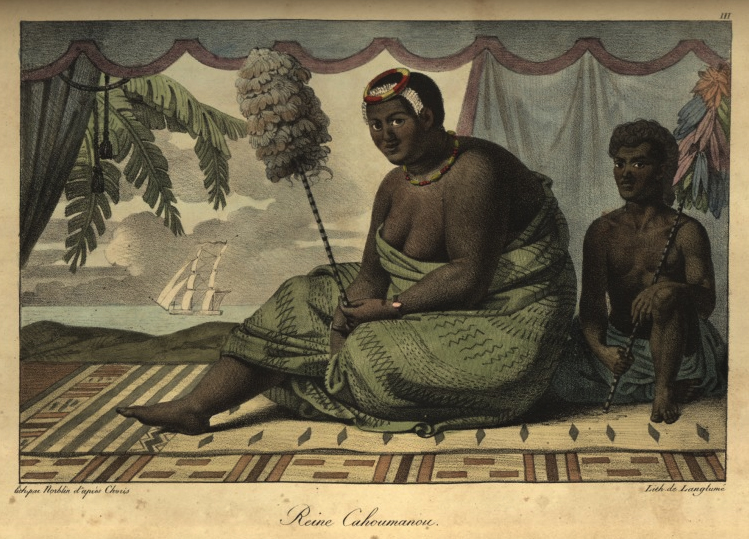
- Queen Ka’ahumanu with her servant on rug lithograph by Jean-Pierre Norblin de La Gourdaine after painting by Louis Choris, the artist aboard the Russian ship Rurick, which visited Hawai'i in 1816

Queen consort of the Hawaiian Kingdom
- Tenure: 1795–1819

Kuhina Nui of the Hawaiian Kingdom
- Tenure: May 20, 1819 – June 5, 1832
- Predecessor: Office Established
- Successor: Kaʻahumanu II
- Born: March 17, 1768; Puu Kauiki, Hāna, Maui
- Died: June 5, 1832 (aged 64); Mānoa Valley, near Honolulu, Oʻahu
- Burial: Royal Mausoleum at Mauna ʻAla
- Spouse: Kamehameha I Kaumualiʻi; Kealiʻiahonui
- Issue: David Kamehameha (hānai); Keʻelikōlani (hānai); Theresa Owana Kaheiheimālie Rives (hānai); Virginia Kahoa Kaʻahumanu Rives (hānai)
Names
- Elizabeth Kaʻahumanu
- House: Kamehameha; Kekaulike
- Father: Keʻeaumoku Pāpaʻiahiahi
- Mother: Nāmāhāna i Kaleleokalani

Kaʻahumanu ("The Feathered Mantle", March 17, 1768 – June 5, 1832) was queen consort and acted as regent of the Hawaiian Kingdom as Kuhina Nui. She was the favorite wife of King Kamehameha I and also the most politically powerful, and continued to wield considerable power as co-ruler in the kingdom during the reigns of his first two successors.

== Early life ==
Kaʻahumanu was born in a cave called Puu Kauiki in Hāna on the Hawaiian island of Maui. She was born on March 17, 1768. The present Kaʻahumanu Society celebrates her birthday on March 17.

Kaʻahumanu's father was Keʻeaumoku Pāpaʻiahiahi, a fugitive aliʻi (noble) from the island of Hawaiʻi, and her mother was Nāmāhānaikaleleokalani, daughter of Mō'ī Kekaulike Kalaninui Kui Hono and wife of her half-brother, the late king of Maui, Kamehamehanui. Through her mother, she was related to many aliʻi nui of Maui. Through her father, she was the third cousin of Kamehameha I, both sharing the common ancestor, Princess Kalanikauleleiaiwi of the island of Hawaiʻi. She was named after her father's rival, Kahekilinuiʻahumanu, because it was from him that her father was fleeing at the time.

Her siblings include Governor John Adams Kuakini of the island Hawaiʻi, Queen Kalākua Kaheiheimālie, and Governor George Keʻeaumoku II of Maui.

Her father became an advisor and friend to Kamehameha I, eventually serving as the royal governor of Maui. He arranged for Kaʻahumanu to marry him when she was thirteen years old. Kamehameha had numerous wives, but Kaʻahumanu would become a favourite and encouraged his war to unify the islands.

== Queen Regent ==
Kaʻahumanu was one of Kamehameha I's favorite wives and his most powerful. Upon Kamehameha's death on May 8, 1819, Kaʻahumanu announced that late king had wished that she share governance over the Kingdom of Hawaiʻi with his 22-year-old son Liholiho, who took the name of Kamehameha II. The council of advisors agreed and created the post of kuhina nui for her, which was similar to co-regent or modern-day prime minister. Her power base grew and she ruled as Queen Regent during the reigns of both Kamehameha II and Kauikeaouli, who assumed the throne as Kamehameha III.

In some ways Kaʻahumanu was ahead of her time and championed the rights of native Hawaiian women, although this was to her own advantage. In what became known as the 'Ai Noa (free eating), Kaʻahumanu conspired with Keōpūolani, another of her late husband's wives who was also Kamehameha II's mother, to eat at the same table with the young king. Notably, she also convinced the Kahuna-nui (translatable to High Priest) of the kingdom, Hewahewa, to support her efforts to abolish the kapu. While breaking a major kapu was a death penalty offence, Kamehameha II refused to kill his mother, Keōpūolani; this event effectively broke the monarchy's support of the kapu, and resulted in the system being outlawed.

== Kaumualiʻi of Kauaʻi ==
The island of Kauaʻi and its subject island Niʻihau had never been forcibly conquered by Kamehameha. After years of resistance they negotiated a bloodless surrender in the face of Kamehameha's armada. In 1810 the island's King, Kaumualiʻi, became a vassal to Kamehameha. When Kamehameha I died, Kamehameha II and Kaʻahumanu feared Kauaʻi would break away from the kingdom. To preserve the union they kidnapped Kaumualiʻi on October 9, 1821, and Kaʻahumanu married him by force. After Kaumualiʻi died in 1824, and a rebellion by Kaumualiʻi's son Humehume was put down, she married his other son Kealiʻiahonui.

== Conversion to Christianity ==
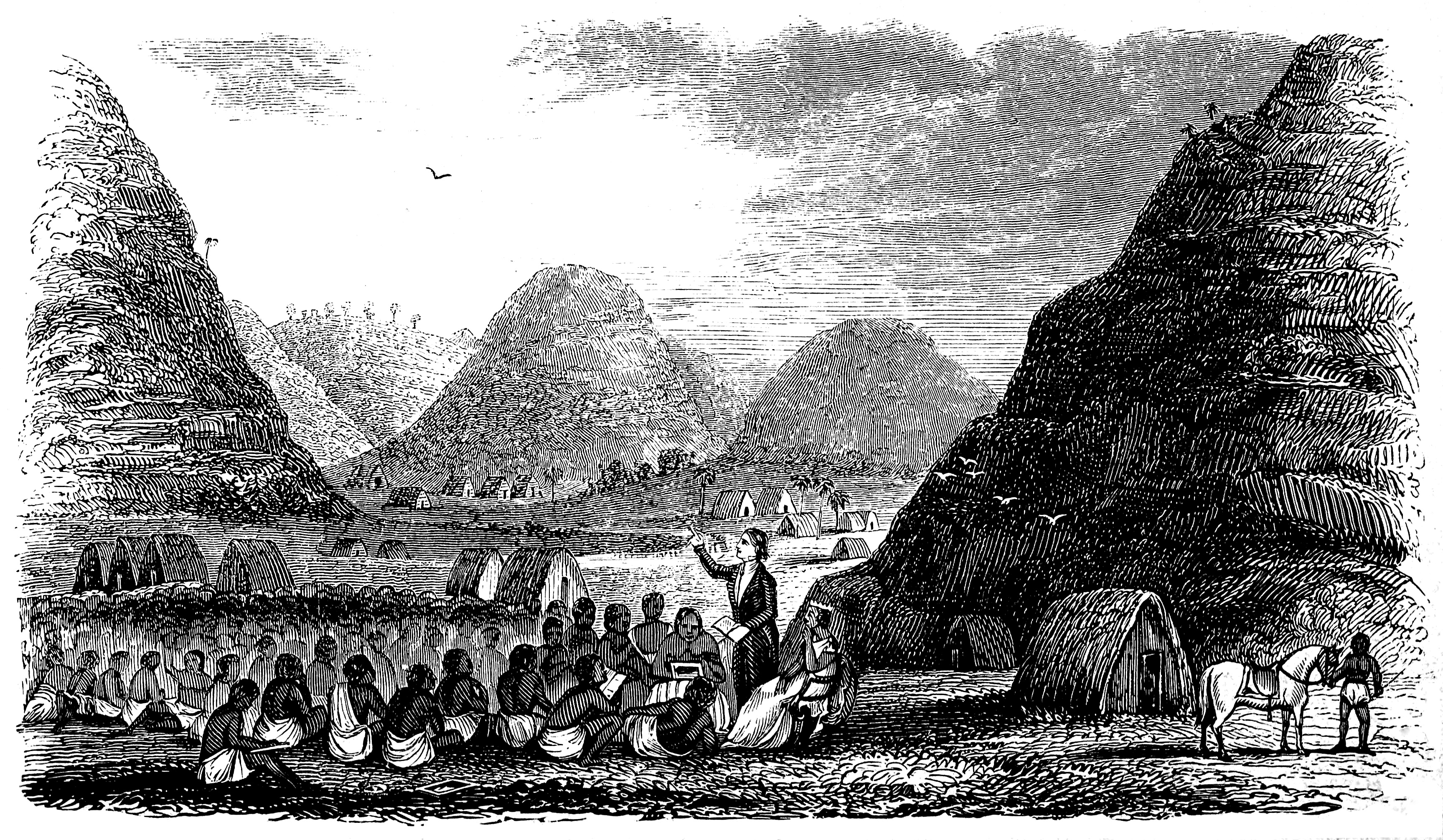
Hiram Bingham preaching to Queen Kaʻahumanu at Waimea in 1826

In April 1824, Kaʻahumanu publicly acknowledged her conversion to Protestant Christianity and encouraged her subjects to be baptized into the faith. That same year, she presented Hawaiʻi with its first codified body of laws modeled after Christian ethics and values, and the Ten Commandments. Kaʻahumanu was baptized on December 5, 1825, at the site where Kawaiahaʻo Church stands today, taking the name "Elizabeth".

Missionaries persuaded Kaʻahumanu that the Roman Catholic Church, which had established the Cathedral of Our Lady of Peace in Honolulu, should be removed from the island nation. On July 7, 1827, she ordered the first Catholic missionaries to leave. In 1830, Kaʻahumanu signed legislation that forbade Catholic teachings and threatened to deport whoever broke the law.

In 1832, Kaʻahumanu visited Maui, and came to the site of what is now Kaʻahumanu Church, witnessing services being presided by Jonathan Smith Green. Upon seeing this, Kaʻahumanu asked the Congregationalist mission to name the permanent church structure after her. However, this request was not honored until 1876, when Edward Bailey built the fourth and current structure on the site, naming it after the Queen.

== Banning Hula ==
As regent of Hawai'i after the death of her husband, King Kamehameha I, Ka'ahumanu took it upon herself to enforce Christian policies with her power, banning the traditional hula dance in 1830. After her death in 1832, some chiefs ignored this ban, including King Kamehameha III. However it was not until King Kalakaua's reign in 1886 that hula was celebrated openly once again: "Hula is the language of the heart and therefore the heartbeat of the Hawaiian people." Ka'ahumanu's policies on hula have had a ripple effect on the acceptability of the art form ever since.

== Establishing American relations ==
Kaʻahumanu and King Kamehameha III negotiated the first treaty between the Kingdom of Hawaiʻi and the United States in 1826, under the administration of President John Quincy Adams. The treaty assumed responsibility on behalf of native Hawaiians with debts to American traders and paid the bill with $150,000 worth of sandalwood; this won her the support of chiefs who owed money to the traders. The same document was also a free trade treaty, ensuring Americans had the right to enter all ports of Hawaiʻi to do business. Americans were also afforded the right to sue in Hawaiian courts and be protected by Hawaiian laws.

In 1827, after Kaʻahumanu returned from a tour of the windward islands, her health steadily declined. During her illness missionaries printed the first copy, bound in red leather with her name engraved in gold letters, of the New Testament in the Hawaiian language. She kept it with her until her death of intestinal illness, June 5, 1832, in the Mānoa Valley near Honolulu. Her funeral was held at Kawaiahaʻo Church, often referred to as the Westminster Abbey of Hawaiʻi. Services were presided by Hiram Bingham. She was laid to rest on ʻIolani Palace grounds but was later moved to the Royal Mausoleum. The monument of Kaumualiʻi in Waiola Church cemetery includes the inscription, "Kaahumanu was his wife, Year 1822," leading some to mistakenly conclude that she is buried there.

== Notes ==
A portion of the Hawaii Belt Road, state highway 19, on the Big Island of Hawaiʻi is named in her honor. It connects the towns of Kailua-Kona and Kawaihae. Often referred to by locals as "the Queen K," it is used for the bicycle and running portions of the Ironman World Championship Triathlon. It also provides access to the Kona International Airport.

Queen Kaʻahumanu Center shopping mall is located at 275 West Kaʻahumanu Avenue (Hawai state route 32) in Kahului, Maui, 20°53′12″N 156°28′30″W.

Kaʻahumanu Society, a Hawaiian civics club, was founded and named in her honor in 1864 to celebrate her legacy, serve the poor and sick and promote the importance of Hawaiian female leadership.

Royal titles
| First | Queen consort of the Hawaiian Islands; 1810–1819 | Succeeded by Queen Kamāmalu |
| First | Queen dowager of the Hawaiian Islands; 1819–1832 | Succeeded by Queen Kalama |
| First | Kuhina Nui of the Hawaiian Islands; May 20, 1819 – June 5, 1832 | Succeeded by Kaʻahumanu II |
| First | Queen regent of Hawaiʻi; 1824–1832 | Succeeded by Kaʻahumanu II |
