= Kuhina Nui =

Office in the Kingdom of Hawaiʻi

Kuhina Nui of Hawaii
- Flag of the Kuhina Nui
- Style: His/Her Highness
- Appointer: The monarch
- Formation: 1819
- First holder: Kaʻahumanu I
- Final holder: Mataio Kekūanaōʻa
- Abolished: 1864

Kuhina Nui was a powerful office in the Kingdom of Hawaiʻi from 1819 to 1864. It was usually held by a relative of the king and was the rough equivalent of the 19th-century European office of Prime Minister or sometimes Regent.

== Origin of the office ==
Before the establishment of the office of Kuhina Nui by Kamehameha, there was a position called Kālaimoku (kālai meaning "to carve" and moku being an island). This was an ancient office from the very dawn of Hawaiian civilization. During this time before the Kuhina Nui Kalanimoku, a trusted chief of Kamehameha, was the Kālaimoku until Kamehameha established the office of the Kuhina Nui. When King Kamehameha II assumed the throne in 1819, his father's favorite wife, Queen Kaʻahumanu, told him Kamehameha I had wished for her to rule the kingdom alongside him. Whether this was really the will of Kamehameha I is a matter of debate. In either case, Kamehameha II did not object and the office of Kuhina Nui was created for Kaʻahumanu. According to other sources, Kamehameha I had wanted Kaʻahumanu to succeed her father Keʻeaumoku Pāpaʻiahiahi as a chief counselor.

Kaʻahumanu became the driving force behind the kingdom’s policy during the reign of Kamehameha II. She and another one of Kamehameha I's wives (and Kamehameha II's mother), Keōpūolani, pressured Kamehameha II into abolishing the old kapu system of laws and religion.

== Conflict between the Kuhina Nui and the king ==
At the death of Kamehameha II in 1824, his younger brother and heir Kauikeaouli was still only a child. Because of this, Kaʻahumanu ruled in his place as regent. After her death in 1832, a queen named Kīnaʻu, a daughter of Kamehameha I and the Dowager Queen of Kamehameha II, assumed the office of Kuhina Nui as Kaʻahumanu II and the regency until her half-brother Kauikeaouli declared himself to be of age in 1833. Kauikeaouli was crowned King Kamehameha III thereafter and the office of Kuhina Nui became the second-most powerful office in the kingdom.

During Kīnaʻu's time in office, the offices of the king and Kuhina Nui often battled for power. This was mainly due to conflict between the views of the two people holding the office. While Kamehameha III desired a revival of the old Hawaiian culture, his elder sister Kīnaʻu wanted Hawaiʻi to be a Protestant state which tolerated no other religion. For the first few years of Kamehameha III’s reign, the kingdom suffered from the frequent quarrels between Kīnaʻu and the king.

== Constitution of 1840 ==
The 1840 Constitution of the Kingdom of Hawaiʻi codified the office of Kuhina Nui into law. The constitution specified the following duties and powers:

- The Kuhina Nui was to be appointed by the king.
- All business connected with the special interests of the kingdom which the King wished to transact was to be done by Kuhina Nui under the authority of the king.
- All documents and business of the kingdom executed by the Kuhina Nui were to be considered as executed by the king's authority.
- All government property was to be reported to the Kuhina Nui.
- The king was not allowed to act without the knowledge of the Kuhina Nui, nor was the Kuhina Nui allowed to act without the knowledge of the king.
- All important business of the kingdom which the King chose to transact in person, he could do only with the approbation of the Kuhina Nui.

The 1840 Constitution created a degree of power sharing between the King and Kuhina Nui. Both were given seats in the House of Nobles in the legislature and both also held seats in the kingdom's judiciary.

The position was written into a constitution devised by American attorneys and missionaries. In the United States, women held no political offices, were denied suffrage, and in some states could not even control their inherited property. Yet the Americans William Richards, John Ricord, and William Little Lee all believed it was appropriate to reinforce the power and authority of the Kuhina Nui as an equivalent to the King despite the fact it had become a traditional female office.

== Constitution of 1852 ==
The 1852 Constitution of the Kingdom of Hawaiʻi dedicated a full section (Section 2) to the office of Kuhina Nui. Articles 43 through 48 described the office:

- The Kuhina Nui was given the title, "Kuhina Nui of the Hawaiian Islands", and the style of "Highness."
- All business connected with the special interests of the kingdom, which the King wished to transact, was to be done by Kuhina Nui under the authority of the king
- All documents and business of the kingdom executed by the Kuhina Nui, were to be considered as executed by the king's authority.
- All important business of the kingdom which the king chose to transact in person, he could do only with the approbation of the Kuhina Nui.
- The Kuhina Nui was to act as regent in the absence of the king, or if the king was too young to rule on his own. In addition, should the crown become vacant, the Kuhina Nui would act as monarch until a new king was chosen.

== End of the office ==
The power sharing scheme set in place by Kamehameha III in 1852 seemed to work and it remained in place throughout the remainder of Kamehameha III's reign and throughout the reign of Kamehameha IV. Kamehameha IV and his brother despised the position but Kamehameha IV did place the role upon his sister, Victoria Kamamalu. Mostly she just signed and approved papers to the wishes of her brothers. When Kamehameha V assumed the throne in 1863, however, the new king made it clear that he favored a more autocratic monarchy over the constitutional one set in place in 1852. In 1864, the King issued a new constitution that was much less liberal than the Constitution of 1852. The 1864 Constitution of the Kingdom of Hawaiʻi abolished the office of Kuhina Nui and effectively merged the powers into his own office as King. The office was never revived after that, with the Hawaiian monarchy lasting only about three more decades before being overthrown. The termination of the office did not destroy opportunity for feminine leadership in the kingdom. An office of Prime Minister was created during the reign of King Kalākaua for Walter M. Gibson.

== List of Kuhina Nui ==
The female Kuhina Nui took the title "Kaʻahumanu" followed by a number, in honor of Queen Kaʻahumanu, the first holder of the office, in much the same way that all members of the Kamehameha dynasty took the title "Kamehameha" after King Kamehameha I.

Portrait	Name (Birth–Death)	Took office	Left office
	Kaʻahumanu I (1768–1832)	1819	June 5, 1832
	Kaʻahumanu II (1805–1839)	June 5, 1832	April 4, 1839
	Kaʻahumanu III (1794–1845)	April 5, 1839	June 7, 1845
	Keoni Ana (1810–1857)	June 10, 1845	September 5, 1853
	Lot Kapuāiwa (1830–1872) (future Kamehameha V)	September 5, 1853	September 14, 1853
	Keoni Ana (1810–1857)	September 14, 1853	January 15, 1855
	Kaʻahumanu IV (1838–1866)	January 16, 1855	December 21, 1863
	Mataio Kekūanaōʻa (1793–1868)	December 21, 1863	August 24, 1864

== Bibliography ==
- Mrantz, Maxine. Hawaiian Monarchy: The Romantic Years. Honolulu: Tongg Publishing Co., Ltd., 1974.
- Potter, Norris W. The Hawaiian Monarchy. – Honolulu: The Bess Press, Inc., 1983.
