= Kekāuluohi =

Queen consort of Hawaii (1794–1845)

- Queen Consort of the Hawaiian Islands and Kuhina Nui of the Hawaiian Islands
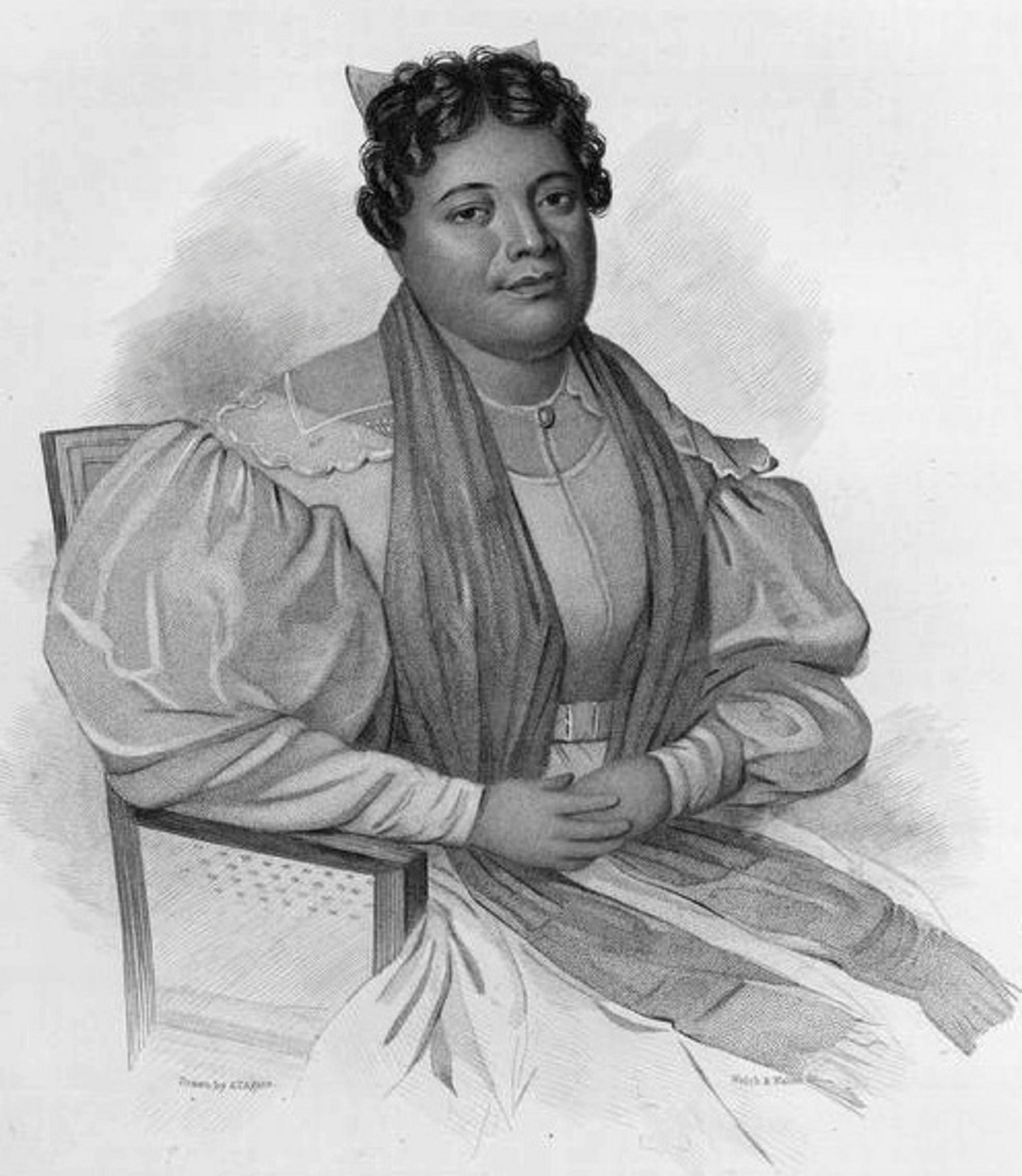

Kaʻahumanu III Kuhina Nui of the Hawaiian Islands
- Reign: April 5, 1839 – June 7, 1845
- Predecessor: Kaʻahumanu II
- Successor: Keoni Ana
- Born: February 27, 1794; Keauhou, Hawaii
- Died: June 7, 1845 (aged 50); Pohukaina, Honolulu
- Burial: Pohukaina Tomb, then at sea
- Spouse: Kamehameha I Kamehameha II; Charles Kanaʻina
- Issue: Lunalilo
Names
- Miriam Auhea Kalani Kui Kawakiu o Kekāuluohi Kealiʻiuhiwaihanau o Kalani Makahonua Ahilapalapa Kai Wikapu o Kaleilei a Kalakua, Kaʻahumanu III
- House: House of Kamehameha
- Father: Kalaʻimamahu
- Mother: Kalākua Kaheiheimālie
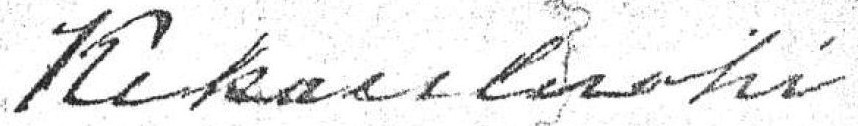
- Signature

Miriam Auhea Kalani Kui Kawakiu o Kekāuluohi Kealiʻiuhiwaihanau o Kalani Makahonua Ahilapalapa Kai Wikapu o Kaleilei a Kalakua also known as Kaʻahumanu III (February 27, 1794 – June 7, 1845), was Kuhina Nui of the Kingdom of Hawaii, a queen consort of both Kamehameha I and Kamehameha II, and mother of Lunalilo. In ʻŌlelo Hawaiʻi (Native Hawaiian language), Kekāuluohi means; "the vigorously growing vine". She adopted her secondary name Auhea, meaning Where, oh where, in memory of the death of Kamehameha I.

== Birth and ancestry ==
Kekāuluohi was born in 1794, the only daughter of her father High Chief Kalaʻimamahu (half-brother of Kamehameha I) with her mother Kalākua Kaheiheimālie of Maui, who was also a wife of Kamehameha I. She was hānai to (adopted by) her grandparents Namahana and Keʻeaumoku, who "fondled her as if she were a feather lei from the precious mamo bird." Through her mother she was a step-daughter of Kamehameha I, founder of the Kingdom of Hawaii, and through her father she was the monarch's niece. She was also half-sister of Kamāmalu and Kīnaʻu.

== Early life ==
She was betrothed to a prince of the Tahitians Pōmare Dynasty at birth, but never married him because of the prince's early death. In 1809 she was chosen along with Manono II by Kamehameha I "to warm his old age". When Kamehameha I died in 1819 she gave herself the name Auhea (where has he gone) in memory of her first husband. She would later marry her cousin Liholiho (who took the throne as King Kamehameha II) as one of his five consorts. She had no children from her first two marriages. In 1821 was given by Kamehameha II to his friend Charles Kanaʻina on Kauaʻi in marriage.

== Kuhina Nui ==
On April 4, 1839, Kīnaʻu, styled as Kaahumanu II, died. The following day Kekāuluohi was initiated into office. Although Kīnaʻu's daughter Victoria Kamāmalu was of higher rank and heir to the premiership, Kekāuluohi was given the position since Victoria was too young. As Kuhina Nui she signed, with the king, all official documents; conducted all executive business affecting the Crown; received and transferred government lands; and served as special Councilor to the king, with exclusive veto power over his decisions. She and Kamehameha III signed the first constitution of the Kingdom of Hawaii in 1840. It provided for an elected representative body, a first step toward the common people gaining political power. She served in the House of Nobles from its founding. The constitution also codified for the first time the responsibilities and authority of the kuhina nui. She held both positions until her death.

== Family ==
She and Kanaʻina had two sons. Their first son Davida, died young. Kekāuluohi gave birth to her second son on January 31, 1835. When a name for the prince was about to be selected, his mother chanted: "I luna, i luna, i lunalilo, the highest, the highest, the highest of all". Although given the Christian name William Charles, he became King Lunalilo of Hawaii in 1873. Kekāuluohi died of influenza at Pohukaina, Honolulu, June 7, 1845. Initially buried in the Pohukaina Tomb, located on grounds of ʻIolani Palace, her remains were not amongst those transported in 1865 to the newly constructed Royal Mausoleum at Mauna ʻAla in the Nuʻuanu Valley. It isn't known if this was a mistake or oversight, but the indignant Lunalilo refused to bury his mother at the Royal Mausoleum and instead arrange her remains to buried at sea. Her father's family line survives today through the descendants of her cousin and namesake Miriam Auhea Kekāuluohi Crowningburg.

A girl's dormitory is named for her at Kamehameha Schools Kapalama Campus.

== See also ==
- Hawaii – Tahiti relations

== Citations ==
| Preceded by Kaʻahumanu II | Kuhina Nui of the Hawaiian Islands; April 5, 1839 – June 7, 1845 | Succeeded by Keoni Ana |
