= James Macrae (botanist) =

Scottish botanist

James Macrae (1791/1792–1830; also used the spelling "McRae") was a Scottish botanical collector who travelled to Hawaii in 1824 and then worked at the botanical garden in Ceylon where he died after just three years. Bulbophyllum macraei, Callista macraei, and Cirrhopetalum macraei are among the plant species named after him.

== Life and work ==
Macrae was born in 1791 or 1792. Little is known of his early life. In 1824 he was sent by the Royal Horticultural Society to travel to Hawaii aboard the HMS Blonde (1824-25). The ship, under the command of Captain George Anson Byron (a cousin of Lord Byron who succeeded to the title of seventh Lord Byron in 1824), was sent to return the bodies of the King Kamehameha II and Queen Kamāmalu of Hawaii who had died from measles in Britain. He took coffee seeds which were planted in Hawaii. The ship left in September 1824 and returned via Madeira, Brazil, Chile, Galapagos, Hawaii, Chile and St. Helena. There was a mutiny en route and the ship also had to rescued the survivors of another vessel. It reached England in March 1826. Macrae brought numerous plants including species of Araucaria. After his return, Macrae was posted to the Royal Botanic Gardens in Peradeniya as a superintendent. He took a special interest in orchids and sent many new species to England.

== Voyage of H.M.S. Blonde ==
Macrae was sent by the Royal Horticultural Society, aboard the H.M.S Blonde to gather botanical and agricultural information, collect plants and give seeds to Hawaiians. Another naturalist Andrew Bloxam whose brother Rowland was ship's chaplain. Ship's artist Robert Dampier also made several important paintings on the voyage. Maria Graham (later, Maria Callcott) wrote a book about the voyage of the H.M.S. Blonde including an account of the voyage and funeral ceremony for the Hawaiian sovereigns whose bodies were being returned to the Kingdom of Hawai'i.

== Death ==
James Macrae died in Ceylon (Sri Lanka) in 1830.

== Written works ==
The standard author abbreviation J.Macrae is used to indicate this person as the author when citing a botanical name.
