= Valparaíso earthquake =

Valparaíso earthquake

- 1730 Valparaíso earthquake
- 1822 Valparaíso earthquake
- 1906 Valparaíso earthquake
- 1965 Valparaíso earthquake and the El Cobre dam failures
