= HMS Blonde (1819) =

46-gun modified Apollo-class fifth-rate frigate

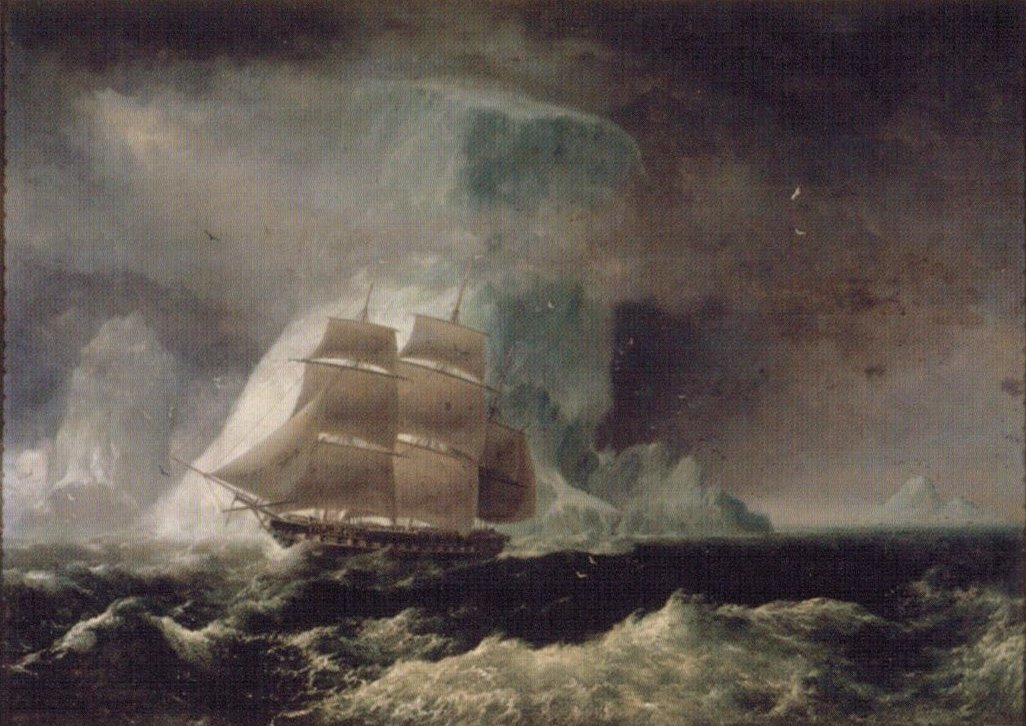
- HMS Blonde, by Robert Dampier, 1825

History

United Kingdom
- Name: HMS Blonde
- Ordered: 11 December 1812
- Builder: Deptford Dockyard
- Laid down: March 1816
- Launched: 12 January 1819
- Completed: 1824
- Renamed: HMS Calypso on 9 March 1870
- Reclassified: Receiving ship in November 1850
- Fate: Sold on 28 February 1895

General characteristics
- Class & type: 46-gun modified Apollo-class fifth-rate frigate
- Tons burthen: 1,103 bm
- Length: 155 ft (47.2 m) (overall); 131 ft 9 in (40.2 m) (keel)
- Beam: 39 ft 8 in (12.1 m)
- Depth of hold: 13 ft 6 in (4.11 m)
- Propulsion: Sails
- Sail plan: Full-rigged ship
- Complement: 315
- Armament: Upper deck: 28 × 18-pounders; Quarter deck: 14 × 32-pounder carronades; Forecastle: 2 × 9-pounders + 2 × 32-pounder carronades

Plan of the Blonde dated 1819

HMS Blonde was a 46-gun modified Apollo-class fifth-rate frigate of 1,103 tons burthen. She undertook an important voyage to the Pacific Ocean in 1824. She was used for harbour service from 1850 and was renamed HMS Calypso in 1870, before being sold in 1895.

== Construction ==
Blonde was ordered on 11 December 1812 from Deptford Dockyard, to a new design developed from the lines of the Apollo class. She was laid down in March 1816, and was rated at 38 guns until February 1817. Blonde was launched on 12 January 1819, but was almost immediately laid up in ordinary at Greenhithe from between April 1819 and 1824, when she was completed and fitted for service at Woolwich. She cost a total of £38,266 to build, with a further £15,241 spent on fitting out.

== Voyage to Hawaii ==
Lord Byron (the 7th Baron, cousin of the famous poet George Gordon Byron) commanded her on an important voyage in 1824. Blonde departed Woolwich, England on 8 September 1824 with the bodies of King Kamehameha II and Queen Kamāmalu of the Kingdom of Hawaii who had died while trying to visit King George IV. The Hawaiian Islands had been named the "Sandwich Islands" in honor of John Montagu, 4th Earl of Sandwich who was the sponsor of the voyage of Captain James Cook in 1776–1779. The crew included James Macrae, Scottish botanist sent by the Royal Horticultural Society, and naturalist Andrew Bloxam whose brother Rowland was ship's chaplain. Ship's artist Robert Dampier also made several important paintings on the voyage.

On 27 November 1824 they arrived at Rio de Janeiro. From 24 December until 1 January 1825 they stayed at St. Catherines in Brazil, where the naturalist gathered some plants he thought might provide commercial crops in Hawaii. On 4 February 1825 they anchored at Valparaíso, Chile, where the Hawaiian Admiral Naihekukui (also known as "Kipihe") died suddenly. From 25 March to 3 April they stayed at the Galapagos Islands. On 1 May several Hawaiians, such as Kuini Liliha were baptised by the ship's chaplain. On 3 May land was first sighted off the island of Hawaii at Hilo. On 4 May they landed at Lahaina on the island of Maui where the Hawaiians disembarked.

On 6 May they landed at Honolulu. A gardener named John Wilkinson had been brought from England to teach agriculture. Before they left England, Governor Boki had agreed to give some land to Wilkinson in the Mānoa Valley, although private ownership of land did not take hold until 1848 in Hawaii. The botanist Macrae left some coffee plants and others he had brought from Brazil. Unfortunately the climate did not agree with Wilkinson, who died in March 1827. Coffee would take many more years to become a successful crop (see also coffee production in Hawaii and Kona coffee).

On 11 May a state funeral was held for the late King and Queen, the first Christian memorial service for a ruler of Hawaii. The crew and many of the Hawaiian nobility attended. On 7 June Blonde sailed back past Maui to Hilo, where they had church services on 12 June. For a while Hilo Bay was called "Byron's Bay" by Europeans. American missionary Joseph Goodrich led a party in an attempt to climb Mauna Kea, the highest point for thousands of miles in any direction. On 15 June they took a canoe to Laupāhoehoe. Although Goodrich did not reach the snow-covered summit due to altitude sickness, a few of the party did on 17 June.

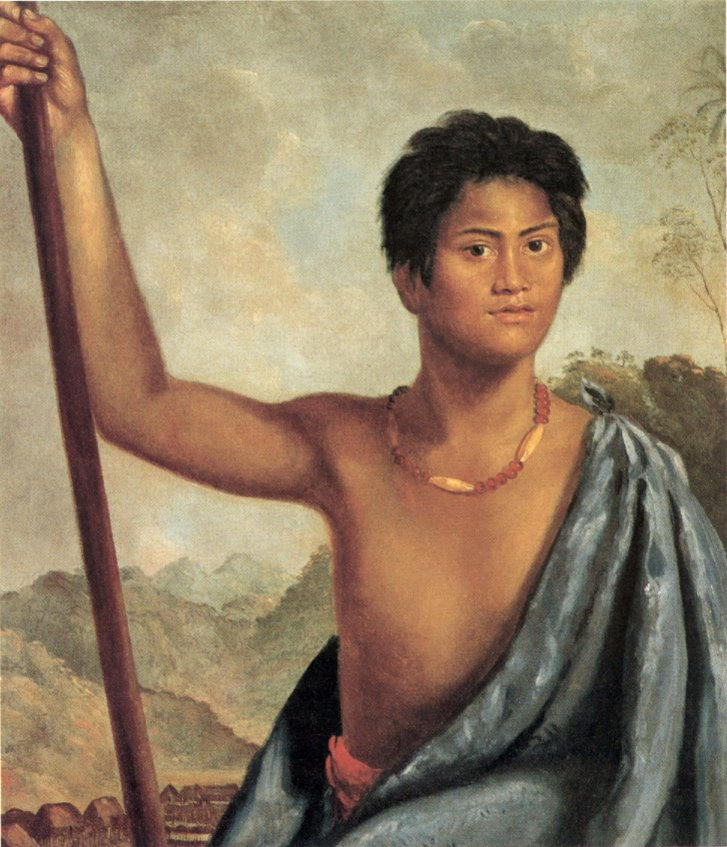
'Karaikapa painted by ship artist Robert Dampier, 1825

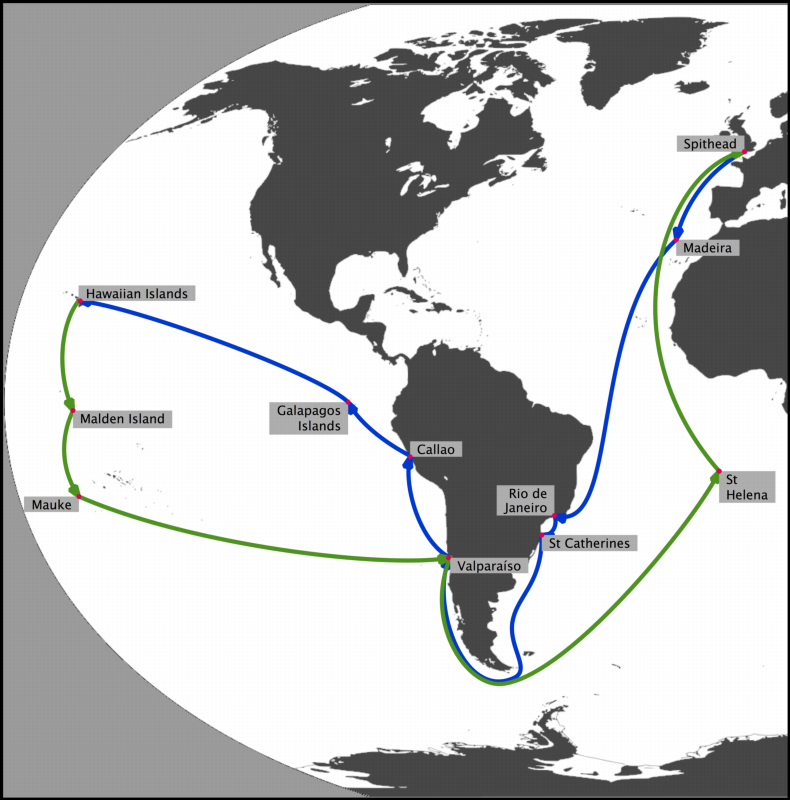
Map of the Voyage of Blonde, showing the main places visited. (The lines between these places are purely schematic and do not represent the actual route.) The journey out to Hawaii is shown in blue, the return in green.

On 25 June a party set out to visit the Kīlauea volcano. They arrived at the smoking crater with glowing red lava on 27 June. Lord Byron visited a few days later. On 7 July they left Hilo and returned to Honolulu by 9 July. On 12 July they left for Kealakekua Bay, arriving on 14 July, where they inspected the place of death of Captain James Cook in 1779. On 15–16 July they visited the royal tomb called Hale o Keawe at Puʻuhonua o Hōnaunau and removed most of the wooden carvings and other artefacts. Byron considered them "pagan symbols". They constructed a post with copper plate as a monument to Captain Cook, and left on 18 July.

On 27 July they crossed the equator planning to go to Tahiti. The crew of Blonde are credited as the first Europeans to see Malden Island, named for navigator Lieutenant Charles Robert Malden on 30 July 1825. They landed on the island, however, and discovered remains of houses. On 1 August they passed Starbuck Island, and landed at Maʻuke in the Cook Islands on 8 August. On 6 September they reached Valparaíso, explored the coast of Chile, and rounded Cape Horn on 29 December. On 7 March 1826, they rescued survivors of Frances Mary and arrived back in England on 15 March.

In 1826, Maria Graham published a book based on Rowland Bloxam's journal. The Huntington Library in Southern California holds the original manuscript of Byron's log of the voyage to and from Hawaii in 1824 and 1825 (https://catalog.huntington.org/record=b1706285).

In 1835 Blonde was stationed at Valparaíso under the command of Commodore Francis Mason when HMS Challenger was shipwrecked. He was unwilling to risk the lee-shore, but Captain Robert FitzRoy of HMS Beagle bullied him into jointly taking Blonde to the rescue.

== Service in China ==
HMS Blonde was involved in a number of actions in China during the First Opium War (1839–1842)

The first introduction of the top-level bureaucrats of the Ottoman Empire to the combination of fork and knife occurred at the ball that took place on the British ship Blonde in Istanbul after the war of 1828–29.

== Fate ==
Blonde became a receiving ship at Portsmouth in November 1850. In the 1861 Census she was at Portsmouth, attached to the royal yacht Osborne, and listed as 'her hulk'. She was renamed HMS Calypso on 9 March 1870. She was sold at Portsmouth on 28 February 1895.

== See also ==
- European and American voyages of scientific exploration
