= Andrew Bloxam =

English clergyman and naturalist (1801-1878)

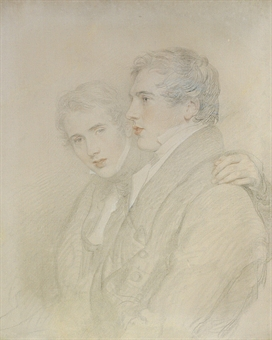
- Portrait of Andrew Bloxam and Richard Rowland Bloxam by their uncle Sir Thomas Lawrence, prior to their voyage in 1824
- Born: 22 September 1801; Rugby, Warwickshire, England
- Died: 2 February 1878 (aged 76); Harborough Magna, Warwickshire, England
- Known for: Voyage to Hawaii; contributions to natural history, especially fungi and the genera Rosa and Rubus.
- Scientific career
- Fields: Natural history, Mycology, Botany
- Author abbrev. (botany): A.Bloxam

Andrew Bloxam (22 September 1801 – 2 February 1878) was an English clergyman and naturalist; in his later life he had a particular interest in botany. He was the naturalist on board HMS Blonde during its voyage around South America and the Pacific in 1824–26, where he collected mainly birds. Later as a Church of England minister he lived in Warwickshire and Leicestershire and made significant contributions to the study of the natural history of the area. His special interest was in fungi and the genera Rubus and Rosa. His botanical author abbreviation is "A.Bloxam".

== Early life and family ==
Andrew Bloxam was born at Rugby, Warwickshire, on 22 September 1801. He was the fourth son of Rev. Richard Rouse Bloxam, who was a schoolmaster at Rugby School, and Ann(e) Lawrence, who was the sister of the painter Sir Thomas Lawrence. He was educated at Rugby School from 1809; he matriculated at Worcester College, Oxford in 1820, graduating B.A. in 1824. His brothers included Matthew Bloxam and John Rouse Bloxam.

In the autumn of 1824, he was appointed as a naturalist on board HMS Blonde, commanded by Capt. Lord Byron, cousin of the poet George Gordon Byron. His brother, R. Rowland Bloxam (1798–1877), was the chaplain. The voyage lasted over 18 months, during which time he visited South America and various islands of the Pacific, including the Galápagos Islands and the Hawaiian Islands (then called the Sandwich Islands). Most of Bloxam's collections during the voyage eventually found their way to the British Museum.

After returning from the voyage on 15 March 1826, he was ordained on 25 June 1826 (Trinity Sunday) as a Church of England minister. He spent some time in Leicestershire and as a curate in Atherstone, before he became the Vicar of Twycross (c. 1840). He remained there until c. 1872, when he was made Vicar of Radford Semele and shortly afterwards Rector of Harborough Magna, where he died on 2 February 1878. He was married to Ann(e) Roby.

=== Descendents ===
In 1866, his daughter Jane Dorothea Bloxam (died 1921) married Sir Henry Hanson Berney, 9th Bart. (died 1907). Sir Henry and Lady Berney's grandson was cricketer Cecil Middleton, son of Henry Middleton who, in April 1900, reportedly witnessed at Filey Brigg the drowning of his first cousin Margaret Middleton. Margaret's sister Gertrude and their cousin Henry Middleton were both students at Oxford University, Bloxham's alma mater.

== Voyage of the Blonde ==
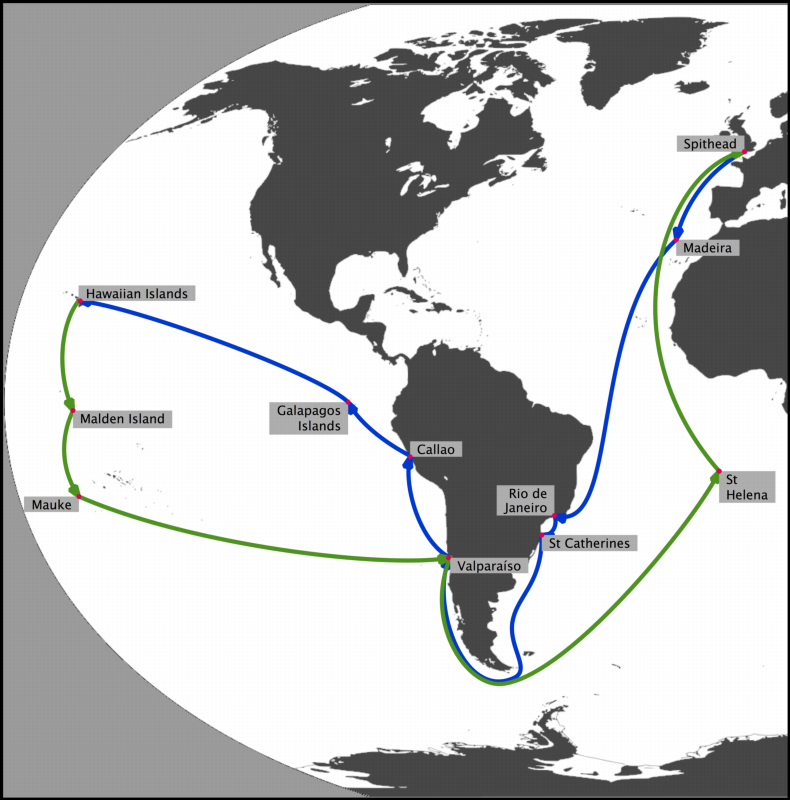
Map of the Voyage of the Blonde, showing the main places visited. (The lines between these places are purely schematic and do not represent the actual route.) The journey out to Hawaii is shown in blue, the return in green.

The main purpose of the voyage was to return to the Kingdom of Hawaii the bodies of King Kamehameha II and Queen Kamamalu who had died of measles while visiting England. Andrew Bloxam was appointed as a naturalist; his brother Rowland Bloxam was the chaplain. The Royal Horticultural Society sent the Scottish botanist James Macrae, whose MS diary was edited by William Wilson and published in 1922.

=== Itinerary ===
The ship left Spithead, England on 28 September 1824. Following a call at Madeira, they reached Rio de Janeiro, Brazil on 27 November 1824. After spending time both in Rio de Janeiro and St Catherine's, they left Brazil on 1 January 1825, bound for Valparaíso, Chile, which they reached on 4 February 1825. They sailed north up the coast to reach Callao, Peru, on 16 March 1825, before sailing west to the Galapagos Islands, where they remained from 25 March to 3 April 1825. The Blonde arrived in the Hawaiian Islands (then known as the Sandwich Islands) on 4 May 1825.

The party remained in the Hawaiian Islands from 4 May to 18 July 1825. They left planning to go to Tahiti, but actually landed first at Malden Island on 30 July 1825 and then at Mauke in the Cook Islands on 8 August 1825, before returning to Valparaíso, which they reached on 6 September 1825. After spending some time exploring the coast of Chile, they finally left Valparaíso on 13 October 1825, bound for St Helena in the South Atlantic, which they reached on 23 January 1826, leaving five days later. The voyage ended back in Spithead, England on 15 March 1826, after an absence of 532 days.

=== Bloxam's contribution as a naturalist ===
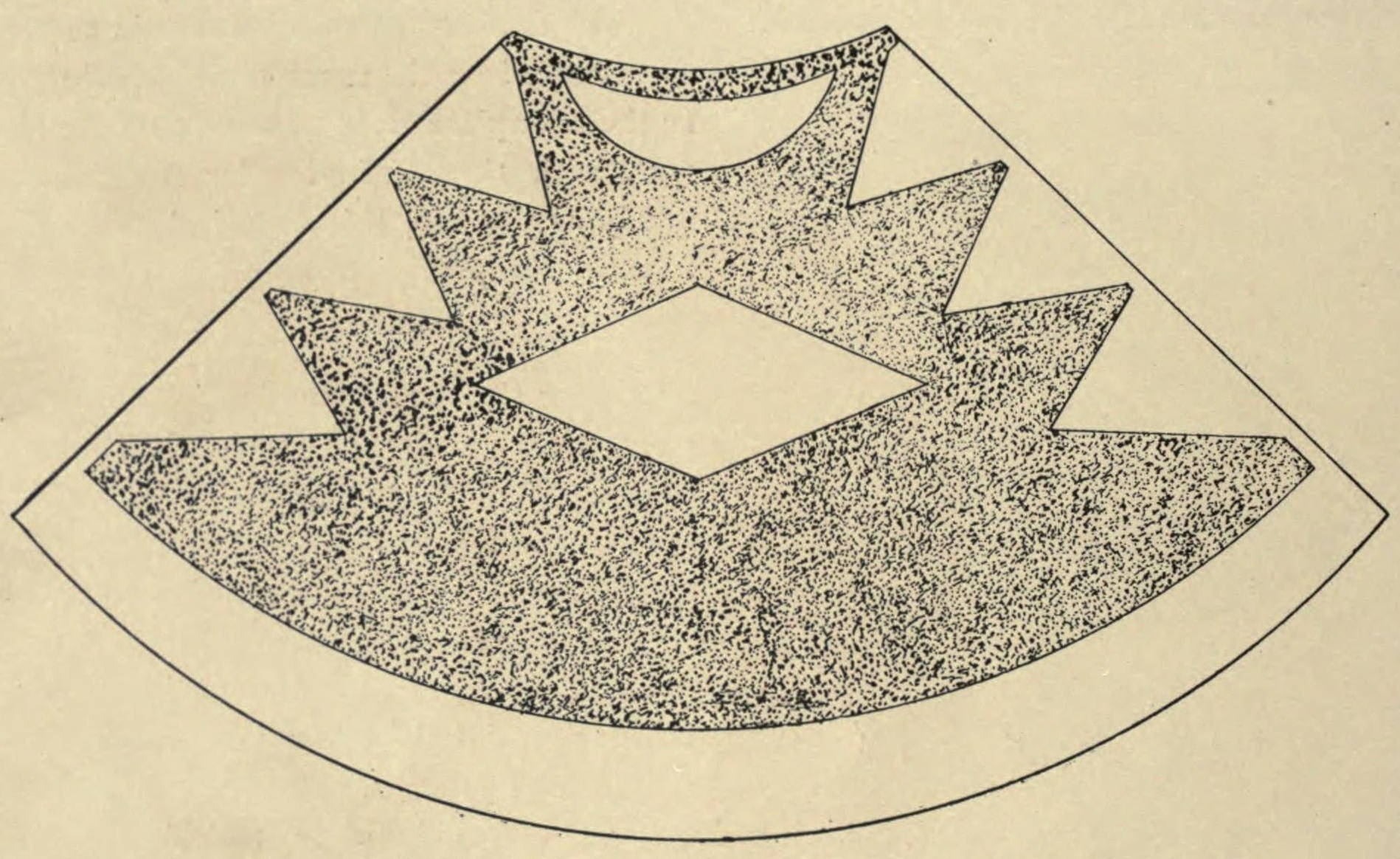
Hawaiian feather cloak made of ʻōʻō and mamo feathers obtained by Bloxam during his voyage

Although in later life, Bloxam was a noted mycologist and botanist and named c. 20 species of fungi and plants (see below), his contributions during the voyage were mainly to ornithology. At the time of the voyage of the Blonde, he was young and inexperienced. According to Macrae's diary (as edited by Wilson), "Andrew Bloxom [sic] acted as a sort of amateur naturalist on the Blonde"; the diary contains other disparaging remarks about Bloxam. Maria Graham (later Maria Callcott) took a somewhat different view: "For the few notices concerning natural history which the work [i.e. her book] contains, it is chiefly indebted to the zealous attention of Mr. A. Bloxam [..] who, if not a learned naturalist, deserves the praise of a diligent and sensible collector." She is in turn critical of Macrae, saying that she regretted that "the practised collector of botanical specimens who went in the Blonde to the Sandwich Islands should not have furnished any account of the plants [..] which he collected."

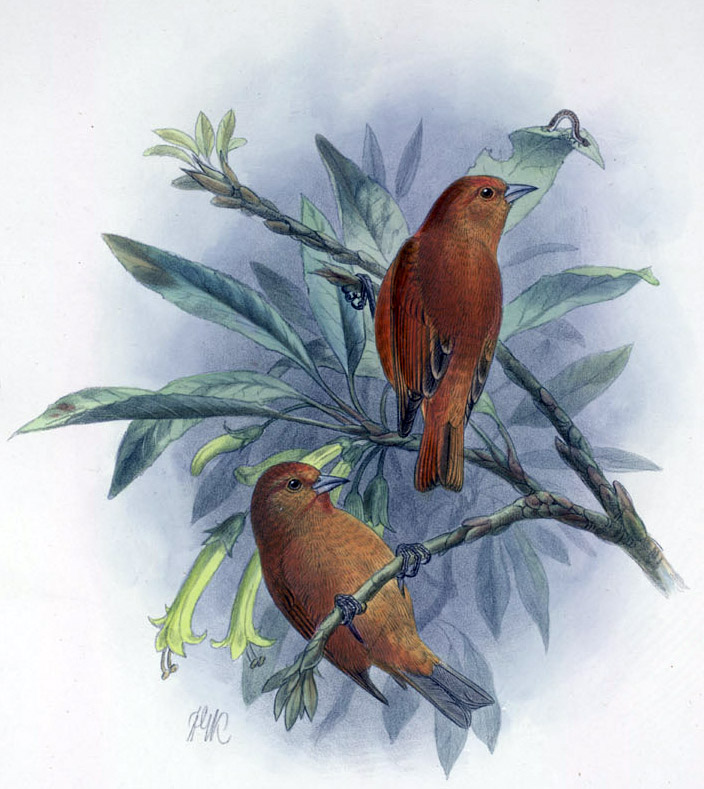
The Oahu ʻakepa, first discovered for science by Bloxam

For a long time the only published record of Bloxam's naturalising during the voyage was a very short section in Graham's book. Only in 1925 was his diary published. Between 1986 and 1996, Olson published detailed studies of Bloxam's ornithological work in the Hawaiian Islands, based on both the diary and unpublished notebooks. Although Olson echoes criticisms of Bloxam ("the ship's callow, humble, and none too ardent naturalist"), he also says that those descriptions which Bloxam did produce are of "commendable accuracy" and that the methods he used to prepare specimens ensured that they survived in "remarkably good condition".

Having been appointed by the Admiralty, on his return Bloxam had written to thank them and to give an account of the specimens he had collected. A barrel contained geological and mineralogical specimens, along with insects, shells and other marine objects from South America and the Pacific islands visited by the Blonde. Two cases contained "about one hundred" specimens of birds. Of these, 27 specimens of 11 species were from the Hawaiian Islands.

One of Bloxam's most well-known bird collections was the Oahu thrush, which he originally called Turdus woahensis (now Myadestes lanaiensis woahensis). Bloxam's 1825 specimens are the only ones in existence, since this rather dull olive-brown thrush-like bird was the first bird species in the Hawaiian islands to become extinct. Bloxam recorded that it was common and that its "melodious notes" came from the only songster on the island of Oahu. Another of his scientific discoveries was the Oahu ʻakepa, which he named Fringilla rufa (now Loxops wolstenholmei or L. coccineus wolstenholmei). This bird too is now extinct.

Bloxam also noticed that the Hawaiian nectar-feeding birds were different from both humming birds and the genus with which they were then associated, Certhia (creepers). He put them into a new genus Nectarina and wrote that in their flight they resembled finches. It was some 150 years later that it was accepted that the Hawaiian honeycreepers (now in several different genera) had evolved from cardueline finches.

In 1995, Olson named the greater Patagonian conure after Bloxam (Cyanoliseus patagonus bloxami). Bloxam collected a specimen in 1825 near Concepcion, Chile.

== Contributions to English Natural History ==
Bloxam does not appear to have maintained a serious interest in ornithology once he had taken up his various clerical posts in Warwickshire and Leicestershire. During the major part of his life in the English Midlands, he combined his duties to his parishes with botanical research and collecting. In his early days in Leicestershire, he became friends with Churchill Babington, a fellow clergyman who was originally from Leicestershire and who was already an "ardent and promising botanist" according to their younger contemporary James Bagnall. Bloxam worked with Babington on the flowering plants of Charnwood Forest. He supplied Hewett C. Watson with copies of the London Catalogue of British Plants marked up with plants seen within three miles of Atherstone and of Twycross; this information was incorporated into Watson's Topographical Botany (1873–74). Bloxam was a major contributor to the first Flora of Leicestershire whose author, Mary Kirby, wrote that the Flora "would never have been attempted without [his] encouragement and invaluable assistance" and that "[s]pecimens of every doubtful plant have been submitted to [him]".

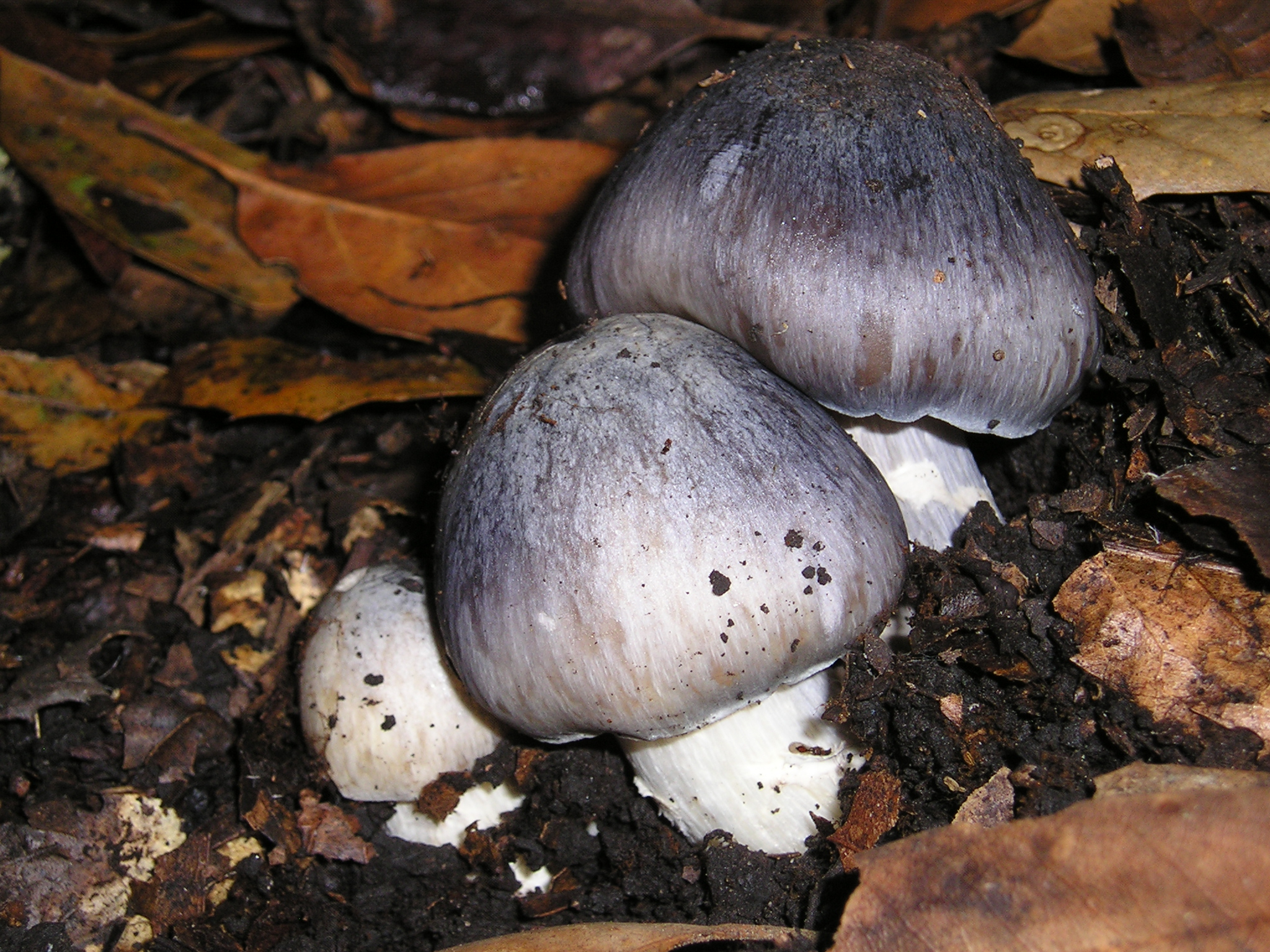
Entoloma bloxamii, named after Andrew Bloxam

Bloxam had a particular interest in brambles (genus Rubus, particularly section Rubus) and roses (genus Rosa). According to Bagnall, Bloxam was one of the earliest English students of these genera, and from 1840 onwards issued 'fasciculi' (i.e. separate sections intended eventually to form a book), which were of great value to beginners who wished to study these plants. Bloxam gave scientific names to at least six species of Rubus, including Rubus colemannii, named after W.H. Coleman, another Midlands clergyman with an interest in natural history. Andrew Bloxam has specimens including a fascicle of Rubus in the Charterhouse School Herbarium which is housed at the University & Jepson Herbaria, University of California, Berkeley.

In 1875, not long before he died, Bloxam was visited by Bagnall, who later wrote that Bloxam was "still full of love for botanical pursuits, with quite a host of brambles and roses cultivated in his garden, so that he might watch them more readily, and I shall always remember with pleasure my walk with him in the lanes around his village, where he pointed out the various special Rubi and Roses of that locality."

Bloxam was also interested in fungi. He was associated with M.J. Berkeley, another clergyman from the English Midlands, who has been called the founder of British mycology. In 1854, Berkeley and his co-worker Broome gave a fungal genus the name Bloxamia in honour of Bloxam's work on the group of fungi then called the Sphaeriacei; they also named after him Agaricus bloxamii (now called Bloxam's Entoloma, Entoloma bloxamii). Bloxam gave new scientific names to at least 11 species of fungi in the Index Fungorum, including the Toasted Waxcap, now Hygrocybe colemanniana.

== See also ==
- European and American voyages of scientific exploration

== Bibliography ==
- Bagnall, James E. (1891), "Flora of Warwickshire", Nature, 43 (1114), London: Gurney & Jackson: 413, Bibcode:1891Natur..43..413B, doi:10.1038/043413a0, OCLC 15190032, S2CID 35724184
- Berkeley, M.J. (1878), "The Rev. Andrew Bloxam: A Memoir", Midland Naturalist, 1: 88–90
- Bloxam, Andrew (1925), Diary of Andrew Bloxam: naturalist of the Blonde on her trip from England to the Hawaiian islands, 1824-25, Volume 10 of Bernice P. Bishop Museum special publication
- Byron, George Anson & Bloxam, Richard Rowland (1826), Graham, Maria (ed.), Voyage of H. M. S. Blonde to the Sandwich islands, in the years 1824-1825, London: John Murray (This work is frequently catalogued under some combination of Bloxam, Byron and Callcott. Only Byron's name appears on the title page, although he does not appear to have contributed to the work in any way. R.R. Bloxam is credited in the introduction. Callcott's surname at the time was Graham.)
- Dampier, Robert (1971), King Joerger, Pauline (ed.), To the Sandwich Islands on H.M.S. Blonde, Honolulu: University Press of Hawaii, ISBN 978-0-87022-176-7
- Kirby, Mary (1850), A Flora of Leicestershire, London: Hamilton, Adams & Co., OCLC 15190119
- Macrae, James (1922), Wilson, William Frederick (ed.), With Lord Byron at the Sandwich Islands in 1825: Being Extracts from the MS Diary of James Macrae, Scottish Botanist, Honolulu, OCLC 454665683
- Olson, Storrs L. (1986a), "An early account of some birds from Mauke, Cook Islands, and the origin of the 'Mysterious Starling' Aplonis mavornata Buller", Notornis, 33 (4): 197–208
- Olson, Storrs L. (1986b), "The correct specific name for the akepa of Oahu (Drepanidini, Loxops)", Bulletin of the British Ornithologists' Club, 106 (4): 148–149
- Olson, Storrs L. (1995), "Types and nomenclature of two Chilean parrots from the voyage of HMS Blonde (1825)", Bulletin of the British Ornithologists' Club, 115 (4): 235–239
- Olson, Storrs L. (1996), "The contribution of the voyage of H.M.S. Blonde to Hawaiian ornithology" (PDF), Archives of Natural History, 23 (1): 1–42, doi:10.3366/anh.1996.23.1.1, archived from the original (PDF) on 18 July 2011
- Potter, Thomas Rossell (1842), History and Antiquities of Charnwood Forest, London: Hamilton, OCLC 449854102
