= Maria Graham =

British travel & children's book writer (1785–1842)

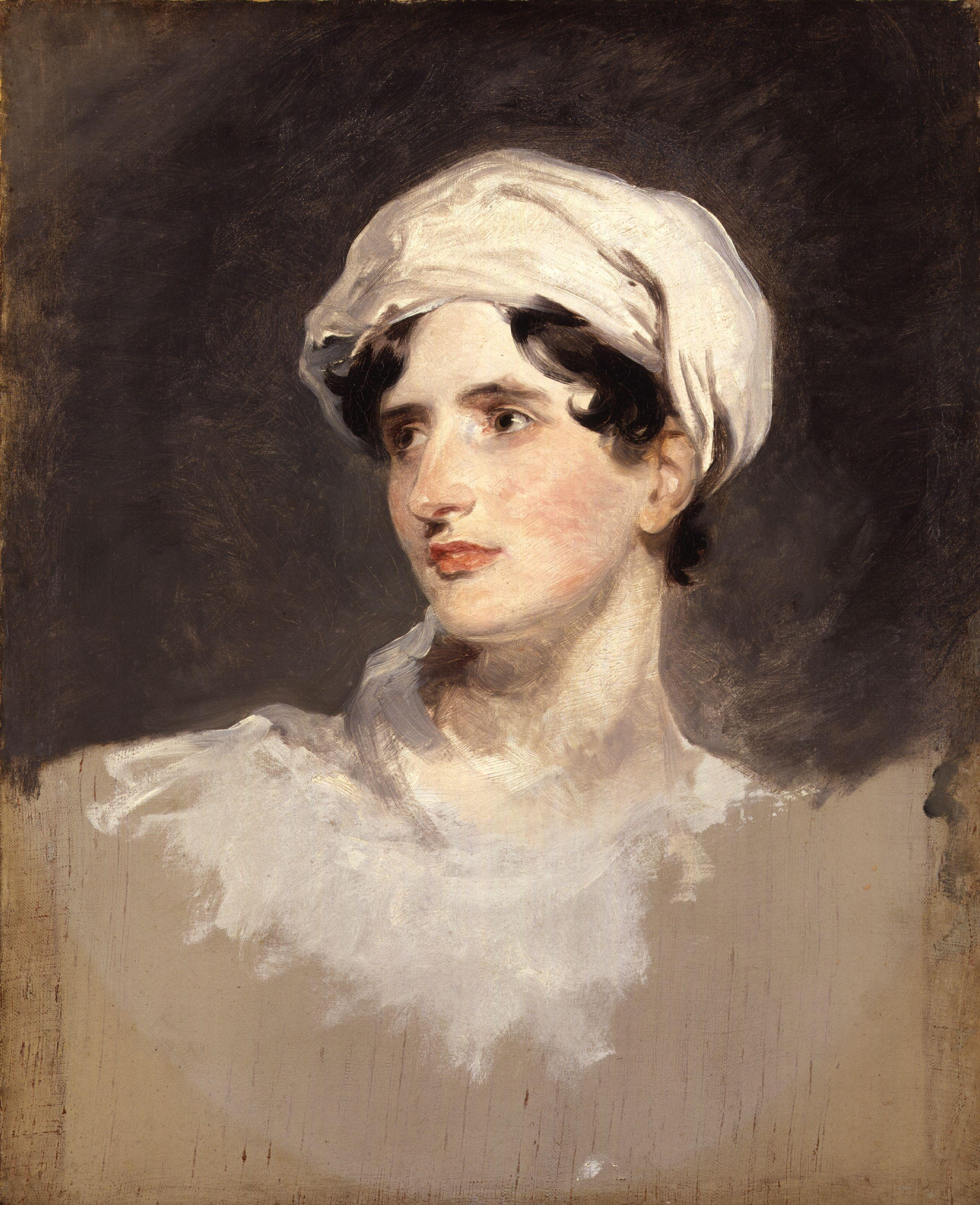
- Maria, Lady Callcott by Sir Thomas Lawrence
- Born: Maria Dundas; 19 July 1785 near Cockermouth, Cumberland, England
- Died: 21 November 1842 (aged 57)
- Other names: Maria, Lady Callcott
- Occupation: Author
- Years active: 1811–1842
- Spouse(s): Thomas Graham; Augustus Wall Callcott
- Parent(s): George Dundas; Ann Thompson

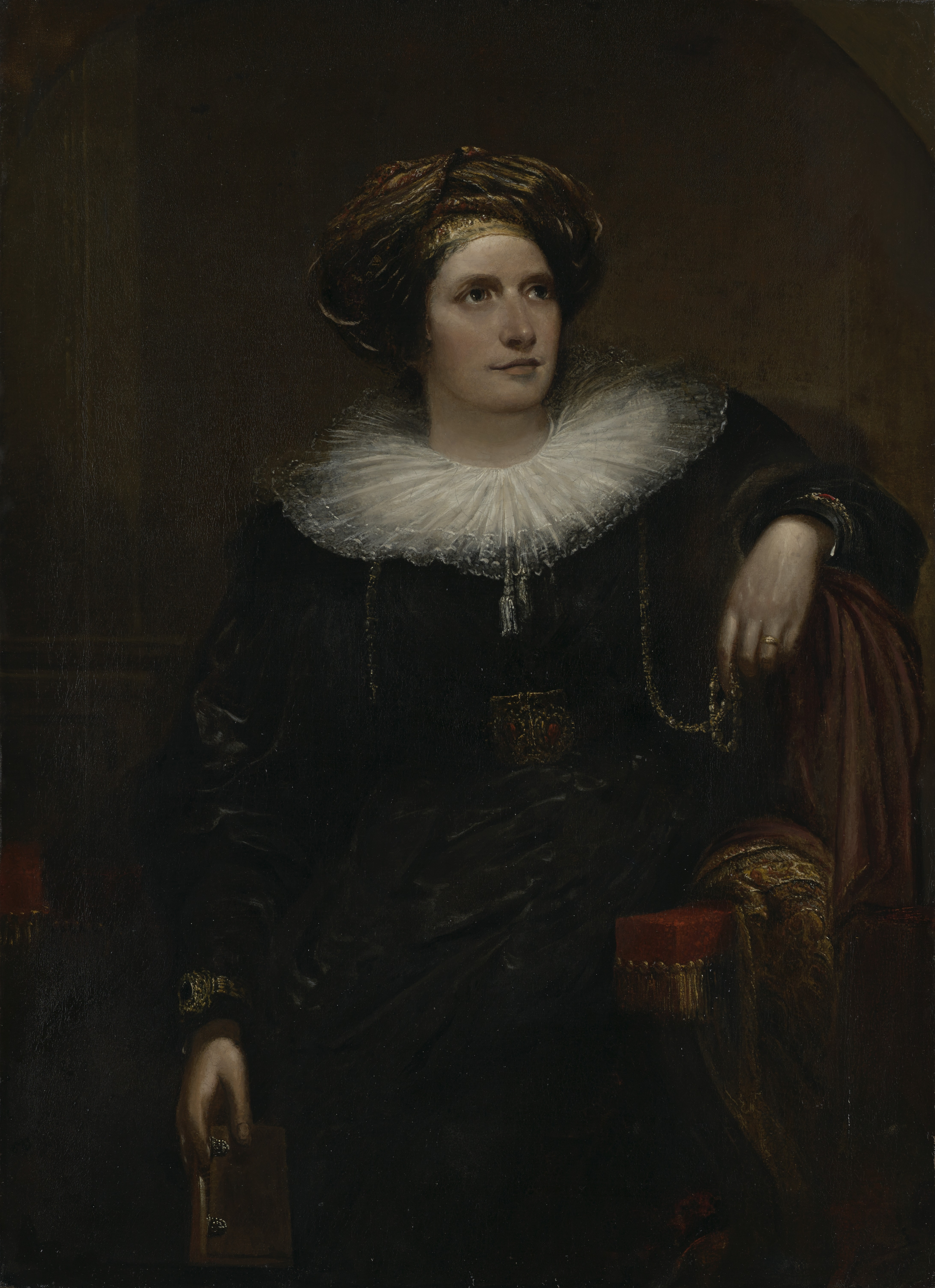
Maria Callcott, painted by her second husband, Sir Augustus Wall Callcott.

Maria Graham, Lady Callcott (née Dundas; 19 July 1785 – 21 November 1842), was a British writer of travel books and children's books, and also an accomplished illustrator.

== Early life ==
She was born near Cockermouth in Cumberland as Maria Dundas. Educated in Richmond, she spent time in the vacation with her uncle Sir David Dundas, who hosted many scientists and academics, which inspired her as a writer. She did not see much of her father during her childhood and teenage years, as he was one of the many naval officers that the Scottish Dundas clan has raised through the years. George Dundas (1756–1814) (not to be confused with the much more famous naval officer George Heneage Lawrence Dundas) was made post-captain in 1795 and saw plenty of action as commander of HMS Juno, a fifth-rate 32-gun frigate, between 1798 and 1802. In 1803 he was given the command of HMS Elephant, a 74-gun third-rate that had been Nelson's flagship during the Battle of Copenhagen in 1801, and took her down to Jamaica to patrol the Caribbean waters until 1806.

In 1808 his sea-fighting years were over, and he took an appointment as head of the naval works at the British East India Company's dockyard in Bombay. When he went out to India he brought his now 23-year-old daughter along. During the long trip Maria Dundas fell in love with a young Scottish naval officer aboard, Thomas Graham, third son to Robert Graham, the last Laird of Fintry. (Note: Graham of Fintry was allowed to keep his title when he lost his lands – source The Lord Lyon of Scotland) They married in India on 9 December 1809. In 1811, the young couple returned to England, where Graham published her first book, Journal of a Residence in India, followed soon afterwards by Letters on India. A few years later her father was appointed commissioner of the naval dockyard in Cape Town, where he died in 1814, aged 58, having been promoted rear-admiral just two months earlier.

== Widow in Chile ==
As all other naval officers' wives, Graham spent several years ashore, seldom seeing her husband. Most of these years she lived in London. But while other officers' wives spent their time with domestic chores, she worked as a translator and book editor. In 1819 she lived in Italy for a time, which resulted in the book Three Months Passed in the Mountains East of Rome, during the Year 1819. Being very interested in the arts, she also wrote a book about the French baroque painter Nicolas Poussin, Memoirs of the Life of Nicholas Poussin, in 1820.

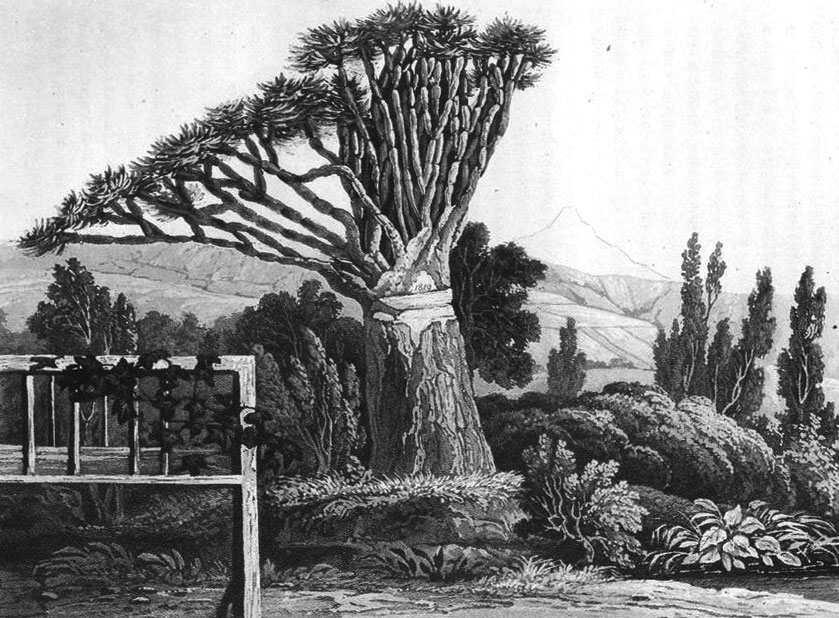
Dragon Tree & Peak of Teneriffe. Drawing by Maria Callcott in her book Journal of a Voyage to Brazil, published 1824

In 1821, Graham was invited to accompany her husband aboard HMS Doris, a 36-gun frigate under his command. The destination was Chile, and the purpose was to protect British mercantile interests in the area. In April 1822, shortly after the ship had rounded Cape Horn, her husband died of a fever, so HMS Doris arrived in Valparaíso without a captain, but rather a captain's widow. All the naval officers stationed in Valparaíso – British, Chilean and American – tried to help Maria (one American captain even offered to sail her back to Britain), but she was determined to manage on her own. She rented a small cottage, turned her back on the English colony ("I say nothing of the English here, because I do not know them except as very civil vulgar people, with one or two exceptions", she later wrote), and lived among the Chileans for a whole year.

Later in 1822, she experienced the Valparaíso earthquake; one of the worst in Chile's history, and recorded its effects in detail. In her journal she recorded that after the earthquake "...the whole shore is more exposed and the rocks are about four feet higher out of the water than before." This idea that the land could be lifted proved controversial, but correct. An extract of Maria's letter to Henry Warburton giving an account of the earthquake was published in 1824 in the Transactions of the Geological Society of London. This was the first paper published in this journal by a woman.

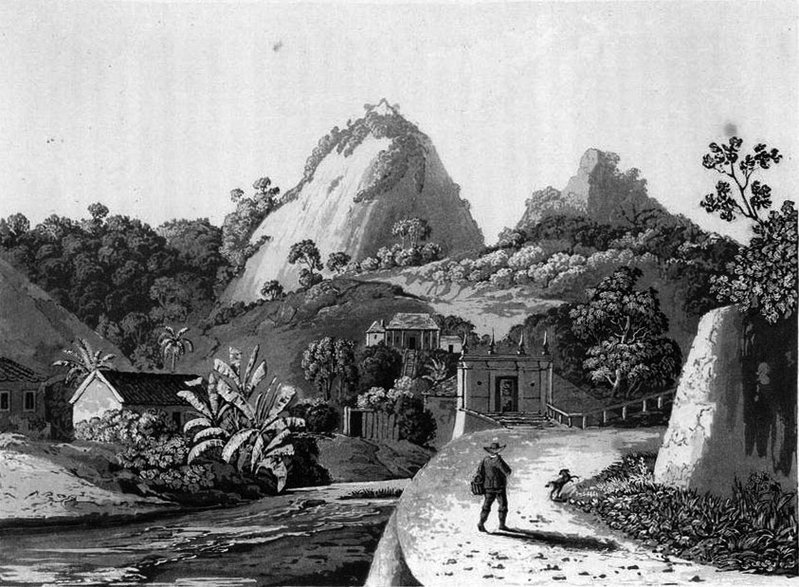
Laranjeiras outside Rio de Janeiro 1821. Drawing by Maria Callcott in Journal of a Voyage to Brazil.

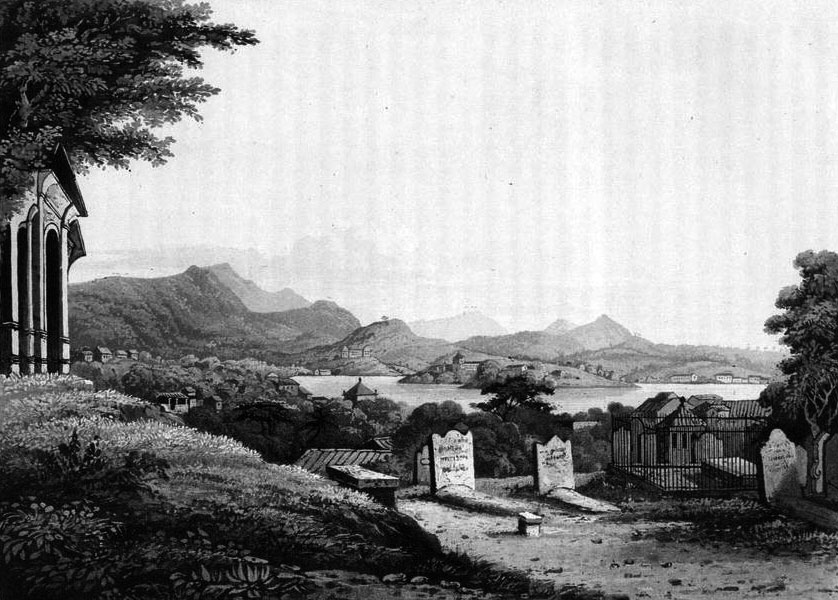
The English burial ground outside Rio de Janeiro 1823. Drawing by Maria Callcott in Journal of a Voyage to Brazil.

== Tutor to the princess ==
In 1823, she began her journey back to Britain. She made a stop in Brazil and was introduced to the newly appointed Brazilian emperor and his family. The year before, the Brazilians had declared independence from Portugal and had asked the resident Portuguese crown prince to become their emperor. It was agreed that Graham should become the tutor of the young Princess Maria da Gloria, so when she reached London, she just handed over the manuscripts of her two new books to her publisher (Journal of a Residence in Chile during the Year 1822. And a Voyage from Chile to Brazil in 1823 and Journal of a Voyage to Brazil, and Residence There, During Part of the Years 1821, 1822, 1823, illustrated by herself), collected suitable educational material, and returned to Brazil in 1824.

She stayed in the royal palace only until October of that year, when she was asked to leave due to courtiers' suspicion of her motives and methods (courtiers seem to have feared, with some justice, that she intended to Anglicize the princess).

During her few months with the royal family, she developed a close friendship with the empress, Maria Leopoldina of Austria, who passionately shared her interests in the natural sciences. After leaving the palace, Graham experienced further difficulties in arranging for her transport home; unwillingly, she remained in Brazil until 1825, when she finally managed to arrange a passport and passage to England. Her treatment by palace courtiers left her with ambivalent feelings about Brazil and its government; she later recorded her version of events in her unpublished manuscript "Memoir of the Life of Don Pedro".

In March 1826, King John VI of Portugal died. His son Pedro inherited the throne, but preferred to remain Emperor of Brazil and thus abdicated the Portuguese throne in favour of his six-year-old daughter within two months.

== Book about HMS Blonde's famous journey ==
After her return from Brazil in 1825, her publisher John Murray asked her to write a book about the famous and recently completed voyage of HMS Blonde to the Sandwich Islands (as Hawaii was then known). King Kamehameha II and Queen Kamamalu of Hawaii had been on a visit to London in 1824 when they both died of the measles, against which they had no immunity. HMS Blonde was commissioned by the British Government to return their bodies to the Kingdom of Hawai'i, with George Anson Byron in command, a cousin of poet Byron.

The resulting book, Voyage of the H.M.S. Blonde to the Sandwich Islands, In The Years 1824–1825, contained a history of the royal couple's unfortunate visit to London, a résumé of the discovery of the Hawaiian Islands and visits by British explorers, as well as the story about Blonde's journey. Her book remains a primary source for the voyage and includes an account of the funeral ceremony for the monarchs of the Kingdom of Hawai'i.

Graham wrote it with the help of official papers and journals kept by the ship's chaplain R. Rowland Bloxam; there is also a short section based on the records of naturalist Andrew Bloxam.

== Second marriage ==
When she arrived in London, Graham had taken rooms in Kensington Gravel Pits, just south of Notting Hill Gate, which was something of an artists' enclave, where Royal Academy painter Augustus Wall Callcott and his musician brother John Wall Callcott lived, among with painters like John Linnell, David Wilkie and William Mulready, and musicians including William Crotch (the first principal of the Royal Academy of Music) and William Horsley (John Callcott's son-in-law). In addition, this close-knit group was frequently visited by artists like John Varley, Edwin Landseer, John Constable and J. M. W. Turner.

Graham's lodgings very quickly became a focal point for London's intellectuals, such as the Scottish poet Thomas Campbell, Graham's book publisher John Murray and the historian Francis Palgrave, but her keen interest and knowledge of painting (she was a skilled illustrator of her own books, and had written the book about Poussin) made it inevitable that she would quickly become part of the artists' enclave, as well.

Graham and Callcott married on his 48th birthday, 20 February 1827. In May of that year, the Callcotts embarked upon a year-long honeymoon to Italy, Germany and Austria, where they studied the art and architecture of those countries exhaustively and met many of the leading art critics, writers and connoisseurs of the time.

== Disability ==
In 1831, Maria Callcott ruptured a blood vessel and became physically disabled. She could no longer travel, but she could continue to entertain her friends, and could continue her writing.

In 1828, immediately after returning from their honeymoon, she had published A Short History of Spain, and in 1835 the writings during her long convalescence resulted in the publication of two books; Description of the chapel of the Annunziata dell’Arena; or Giotto’s Chapel in Padua, and her first and most famous book for children, Little Arthur’s History of England, which has been reprinted numerous times since then (already in 1851 the 16th edition was published, and it was last reprinted in 1981). Little Arthur was followed in 1836 by a French version; Histoire de France du petit Louis.

== Geological debate ==
In the mid-1830s her description of the earthquake in Chile of 1822 started a heated debate in the Geological Society, where she was caught in the middle of a fight between two rivalling schools of thought regarding earthquakes and their role in mountain building. Besides describing the earthquake in her Journal of a Residence in Chile, she had also written about it in more detail in a letter to Henry Warburton, who was one of the Geological Society's founding fathers. As this was one of the first detailed eyewitness accounts by "a learned person" of an earthquake, he found it interesting enough to publish in Transactions of the Geological Society of London in 1823.

One of her observations had been that of large areas of land rising from the sea, and in 1830 that observation was included in the groundbreaking work The Principles of Geology by the geologist Charles Lyell, as evidence in support of his theory that mountains were formed by volcanoes and earthquakes. Four years later the president of the Society, George Bellas Greenough, decided to attack Lyell's theories. But instead of attacking Lyell directly, he did it by publicly ridiculing Maria Callcott's observations.

Maria Callcott, however, was not someone who accepted ridicule. Her husband and her brother offered to duel Greenough, but she said, according to her nephew John Callcott Horsley, "Be quiet, both of you, I am quite capable of fighting my own battles, and intend to do it". She went on to publish a crushing reply to Greenough, and was shortly thereafter backed by none other than Charles Darwin, who had observed the same land rising during Chile's earthquake in 1835, aboard the Beagle.

In 1837 Augustus Callcott was knighted and his wife became known as Lady Callcott. Shortly afterwards her health began to deteriorate, and in 1842 she died aged 57. She continued to write until the very end, and her last book was A Scripture Herbal, an illustrated collection of tidbits and anecdotes about plants and trees mentioned in the Bible, which was published the same year she died.

Augustus Callcott died two years later, at the age of 65, having been made Surveyor of the Queen's Pictures in 1843.

== Professional Career ==
Graham was a prolific children's author, and her 1835 publication of Little Arthur's History of England became one of the best-selling children's histories of the nineteenth century, with a record number of 800,000 copies sold by 1962. In writing Little Arthur, is likely that Graham was inspired by the work of Anna Laetitia Barbauld and her pioneering Lessons for Children.

== Legacy ==
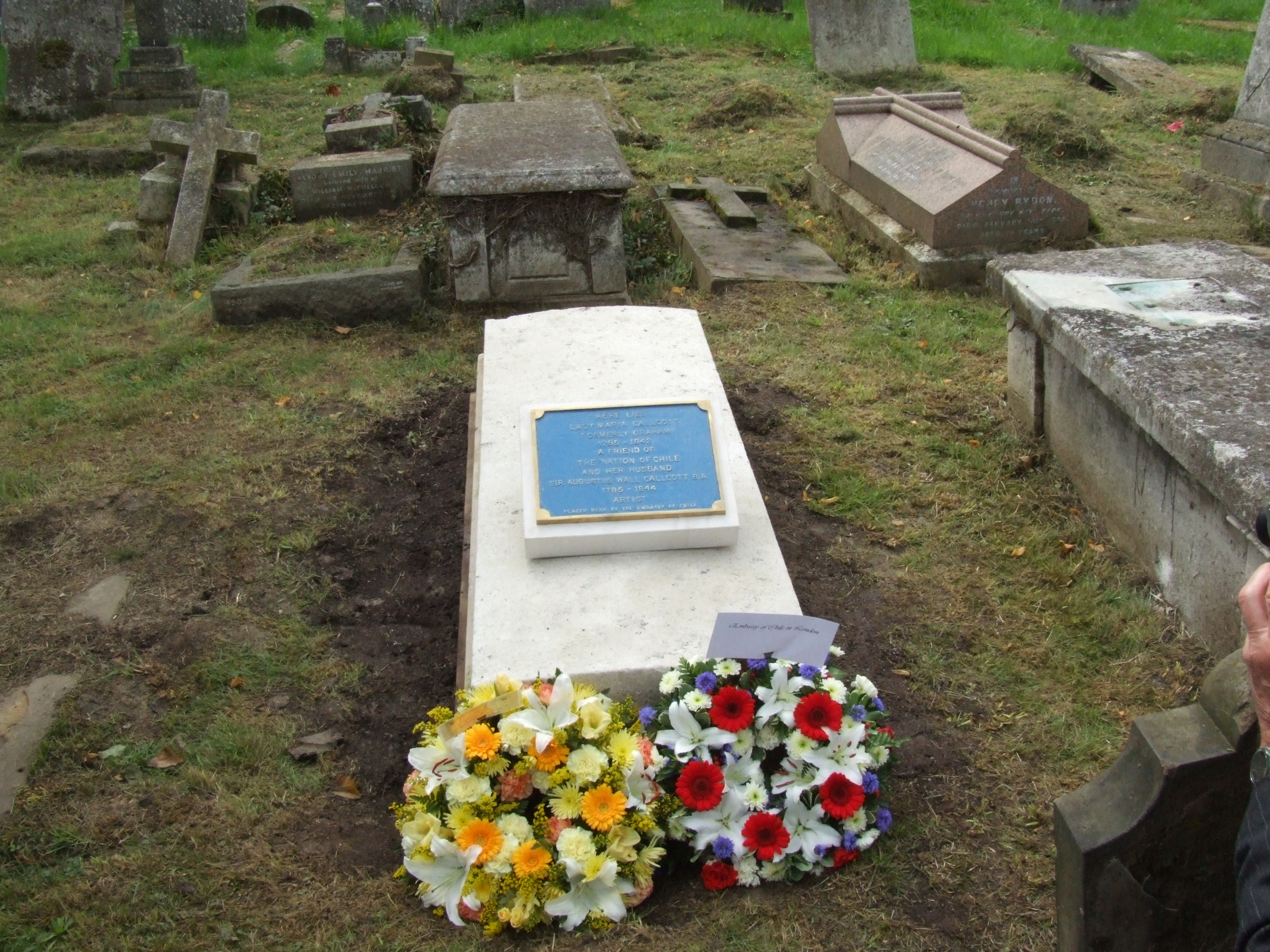
Maria and Augustus Callcott's grave in Kensal Green Cemetery, restored by the Chilean government in 2008.

In recognition of her services to Chile, as being one of the first persons to write about the young nation in the English language, the Chilean government paid for the restoration of Maria and Augustus Callcott's joint grave in Kensal Green Cemetery in London in 2008.

The restoration was finalised with a commemorative plaque, unveiled by the Chilean ambassador to the United Kingdom, Rafael Moreno, at a ceremony on 4 September 2008. The plaque names Maria Callcott "a friend of the nation of Chile".

== Works ==
- As Maria Graham:
  - Journal of a residence in India (1812) – translated into French 1818
  - Memoirs of the war of the French in Spain (by Albert Jean Rocca) – translation from French (1816)
  - Letters on India, with etchings and a map (1814)
  - Memoir of the life of Nicolas Poussin (1820) – translated into French 1821 (Mémoires sur la vie de Nicolas Poussin)
  - Three months passed in the mountains East of Rome, during the Year 1819 (1820) – translated into French 1822
  - Journal of a residence in Chile during the year 1822; and a voyage from Chile to Brazil in 1823 (1824)
  - Journal of a voyage to Brazil, and residence there, during part of the years 1821, 1822, 1823 (1824)
  - Voyage of the H.M.S. Blonde to the Sandwich Islands, in the years 1824-1825 (1826)
- As Maria Callcott or Lady Callcott:
  - A short history of Spain (1828)
  - Description of the chapel of the Annunziata dell'Arena; or, Giotto's chapel in Padua (1835)
  - Little Arthur's history of England(1835)
  - Histoire de France du petit Louis (1836)
  - Essays towards the history of painting (1836)
  - The little bracken-burners, a tale; and Little Mary's four Saturdays (1841)
  - A scripture herbal (1842)

== Sources ==
- Recollections of a Royal Academician by John Callcott Horsley. 1903
- The Cherry Tree No. 2, 2004, published by the Cherry Tree Residents' Amenities Association in Kensington, London

== In Fiction ==
Maria Graham's journey from Brazil to London in the early 1820s is the subject of Sara Sheridan's novel On Starlit Seas (2025) which was shortlisted for the Wilbur Smith Adventure Writing Prize. The novel includes passages about Graham's real-life friendships with publisher John Murray and Captain Thomas Cochrane as well as a fictionalised meeting with Graham's second husband, Augustus Calcott. It was chosen as one of the Best Historical Fiction Books of 2025 by The Times.
