= 1822 Valparaíso earthquake =

Earthquake in Chile

Coordinates: 33.050°S 71.630°W

- Location within Chile
- Magnitude: 8.5 M_{s}
- Fault: Peru-Chile Trench
- Type: Megathrust
- Areas affected: Chile
- Max. intensity: MMI XI (Extreme)
- Tsunami: Yes
- Foreshocks: 14 to 17 November
- Casualties: 72–300 dead, 200 injured

The 1822 Valparaíso earthquake was a major earthquake that occurred in Chile on November 19, 1822. The earthquake has an estimated surface wave magnitude of 8.5. It triggered a moderate tsunami measuring up to 12 ft (3.7 m) along the Chilean coast. The earthquake and tsunami killed between 72 and 300 people and left a further 200 injured.

== Earthquake ==
Based on the historical accounts from Maria Graham, a British travel writer who documented her experience in the earthquake, seismologists concluded that the event was likely a result of thrust faulting. A deep section of the Peru-Chile subduction zone ruptured at a plausible depth of around 40 km. This depth is similar to the 2007 Tocopilla and 1906 Valparaíso earthquakes.

== Damage ==
The earthquake was felt for as much as five minutes. In Concón, three distinct jolts were felt with the second being the most intense and lasting two minutes. A loud rumbling noise that seemed to be emanating from the ground was heard. The luminous activity was also seen in the sky during the quake. A canal connected to the Aconcagua River was buried and suffered cracks by collapsing debris when the riverbank failed.

In Quintero, palm trees were permanently deformed when the earthquake caused them to lean to one side. Nearly every home in the city was so badly damaged by the earthquake and resulting fire that residing in them was impossible. Near the Aconcagua River, the city Quillota also saw the destruction of many homes. Is it said that only 20 homes and a church survived the shocks.

Near Valparaíso, the city of Viña del Mar was near totally destroyed. Nearby cities including Limache and La Ligua were also damaged. In Valparaíso, the earthquake razed at least 700 private homes and countless public homes to the ground. The port area of the city suffered extensive damage because it was situated on loose alluvium. Many mud homes crumbled as a result. Most of the damaged structures were those constructed with bricks. Wooden and stone homes were either undamaged or lightly affected.

The violent shocks caused active mines to cave in and collapse, killing many workers.

Illapel and San Felipe also suffered severe damage. In Santiago, the earthquake was felt VII on the Mercalli intensity scale, causing damage to 30 buildings.

== Quote ==
November 20th, 1822.

‘At a quarter past ten [in the evening], the house received a violent shock, with a noise like the explosion of a mine. I sat still.. until, the vibration still increasing, the chimneys fell, and I saw the walls of the house open.. We jumped down to the ground, and were scarcely there when the motion of the earth changed from a quick vibration to a rolling like that of a ship at sea. The shock lasted three minutes. Never shall I forget the horrible sensation of that night. [Back in the house] I observed that the furniture in the different rooms .. Had all been moved in the same direction, and found that direction to be north-west and south-east.

Mr Cruikshank has ridden over from old Quintero: he tells us that there are large rents along the sea shore; and during the night the sea seems to have receded in an extraordinary manner, and especially in Quintero Bay. I see from the hill, rocks above the water that never were exposed before.

On the night of the nineteenth, during the first great shock, the sea in Valparaiso bay rose suddenly, and as suddenly retired in an extraordinary manner, and in about a quarter of an hour seemed to recover its equilibrium; but the whole shore is more exposed and the rocks are about four feet higher out of the water than before.‘

December 9th, 1822.

‘in the evening I had a pleasant walk to the beach with Lord Cochrane; we went chiefly for the purpose of tracing the effects of the earthquake along the rocks. On the beach, though it is high water, many rocks with beds of muscles remain dry, and the fish are dead; which proves that the beach is raised about four feet at the Herradura. Above these recent shells, beds of older ones may be traced at various heights along the shore; and such are found near the summits of some of the loftiest hills in Chile.‘

In her journal accounts, Graham went on to speculate that repeated earthquakes could be responsible for the general elevation of land, and the building of mountains, in places like the Andes; themes that were later taken up by Charles Lyell, and then Charles Darwin – who was in Chile 13 years later, where he experienced the 1835 Concepcion earthquake firsthand.

— Excerpts from Maria Graham’s ‘Journal of a residence in Chile, during the year 1822; and a voyage from Chile to Brazil, in 1823’, London, 1824,

== Tsunami ==
Three distinct waves struck the coast after the earthquake. A flagship used in rescue and recovery of the earthquake was carried by the first tsunami wave and stranded near the gates of a customs office. The surge retreated, leaving many vessels stranded on the seafloor. After a few minutes, two additional but weaker waves struck the coast.

== See also ==
- List of earthquakes in Chile
- List of megathrust earthquakes
