= Robert Dampier =

British painter (1799–1874)

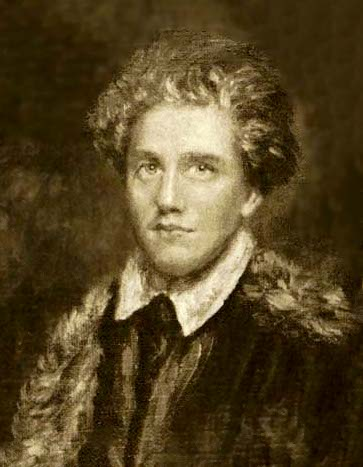
Robert Dampier self-portrait

Robert Dampier (1799–1874) was a British artist and clergyman.

== Life ==
Dampier was born in 1799 in the village of Codford St Peter in Wiltshire, England. He was baptised on 20 December 1799. He was one of 13 children of Codford St Peter's rector Reverend John Dampier (1763–1839) and his wife Jane. In 1819, he went to Rio de Janeiro in Brazil as a clerk. In 1825, he was picked up in Rio to be the expedition artist on the English ship HMS Blonde, under the command of Captain George Anson Byron. The ship was returning the bodies of King Kamehameha II and Queen Kamāmalu to the Hawaiian Islands (known by the British as "Sandwich Islands"). Both the king and the queen had died from measles during a visit to England. Robert Dampier spent 11 weeks in Hawaii painting portraits in oil and making pencil drawings of landscapes.

After returning to England, he studied law at Cambridge University and was then ordained in the Church of England. He married Sophia Francis Roberts in 1828. In 1837, he became rector of Langton Matravers church. Around 1843, the couple had a daughter who was named Juliana Sophia. Robert Dampier was widowed in 1864. He remarried in 1872 and had a daughter named Frederika by his second wife. Alongside his duties as a rector he continued to sketch until his death in 1874.

== Collections ==
Major works by Robert Dampier are held by the Honolulu Museum of Art. The historic site Washington Place, also in Honolulu, Hawaii and a National Historic Landmark since 2008, holds major works by Dampier.

== Paintings ==
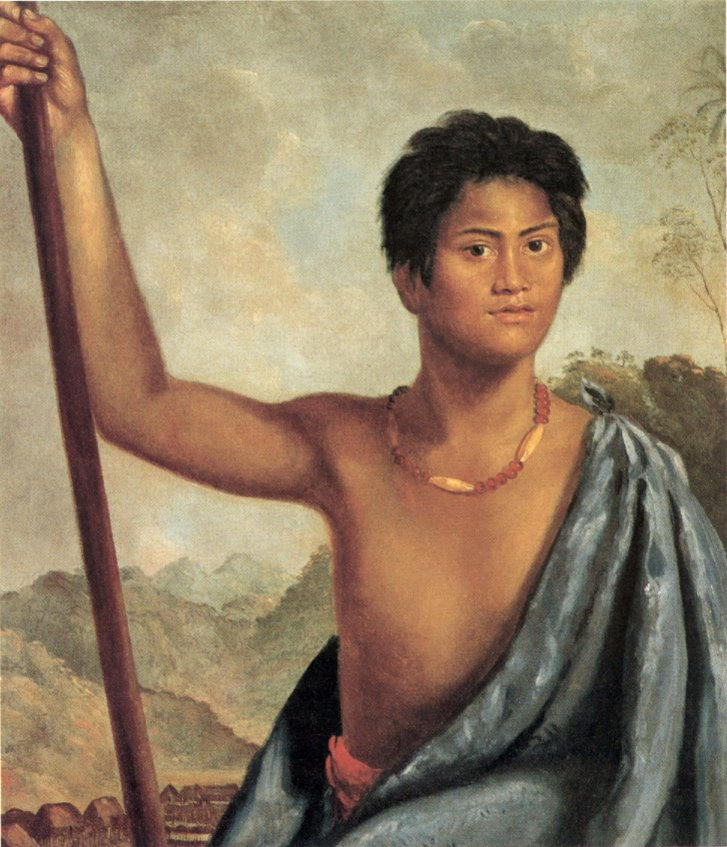
Robert Dampier's oil on canvas painting 'Karaikapa, a Native of the Sandwich Islands, 1825

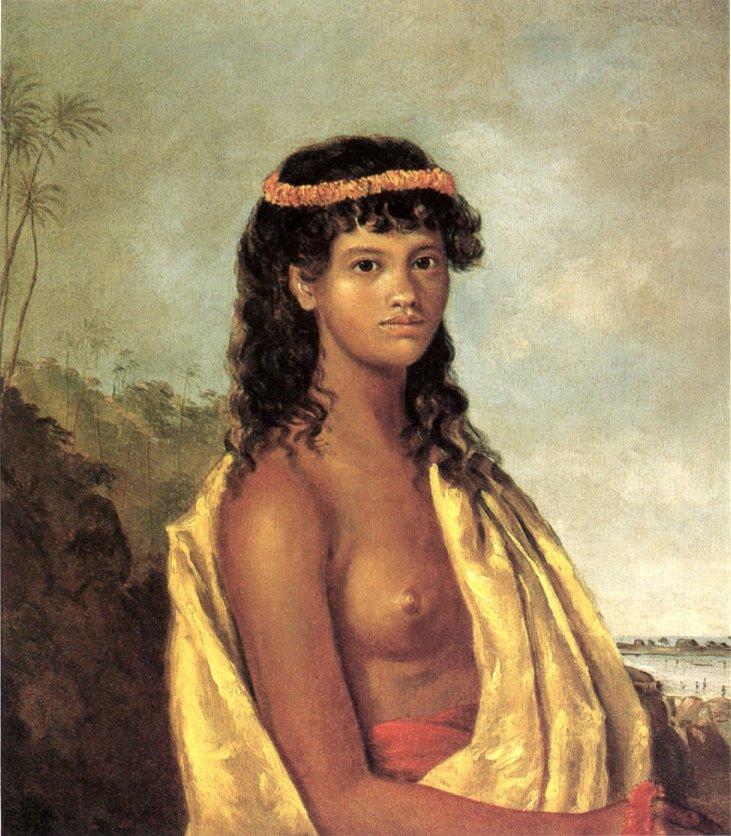
Robert Dampier's oil on canvas painting Tetuppa, a Native Female of the Sandwich Islands, 1825

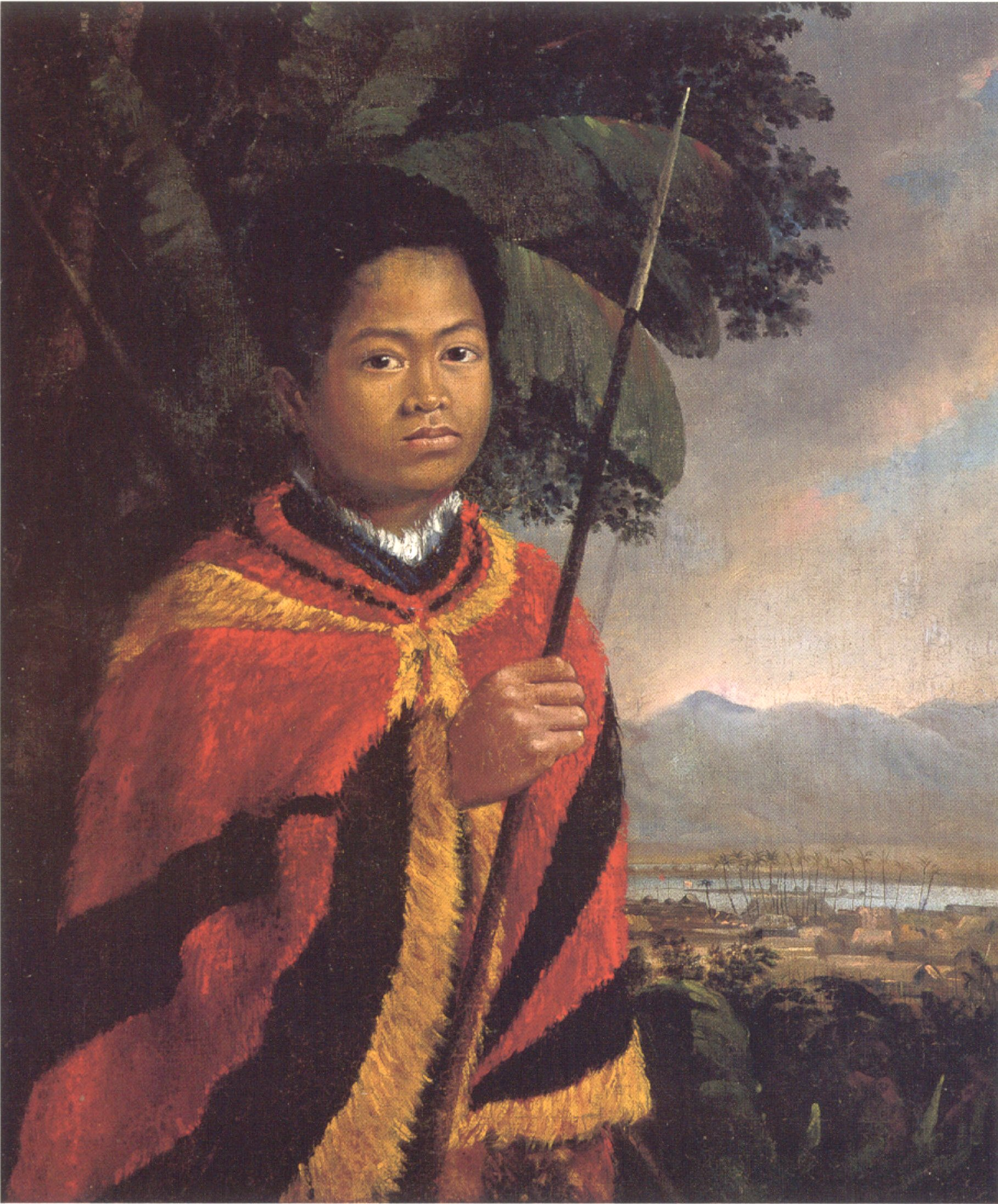
Portrait of King Kamehameha III of Hawaii, oil on canvas painting, 1825, Honolulu Museum of Art

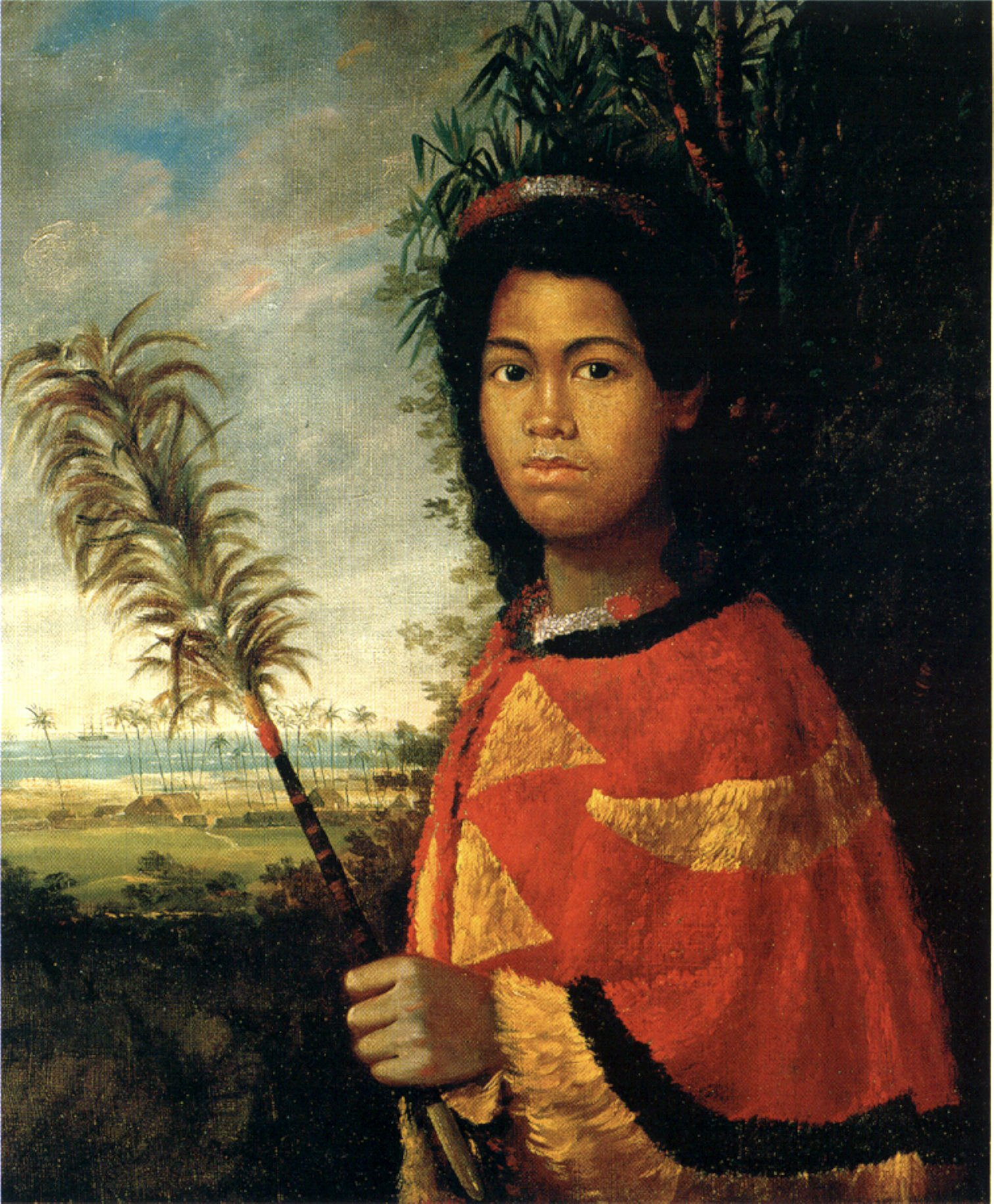
Portrait of Princess Nāhiʻenaʻena of Hawaii, oil on canvas painting, 1825, Honolulu Museum of Art

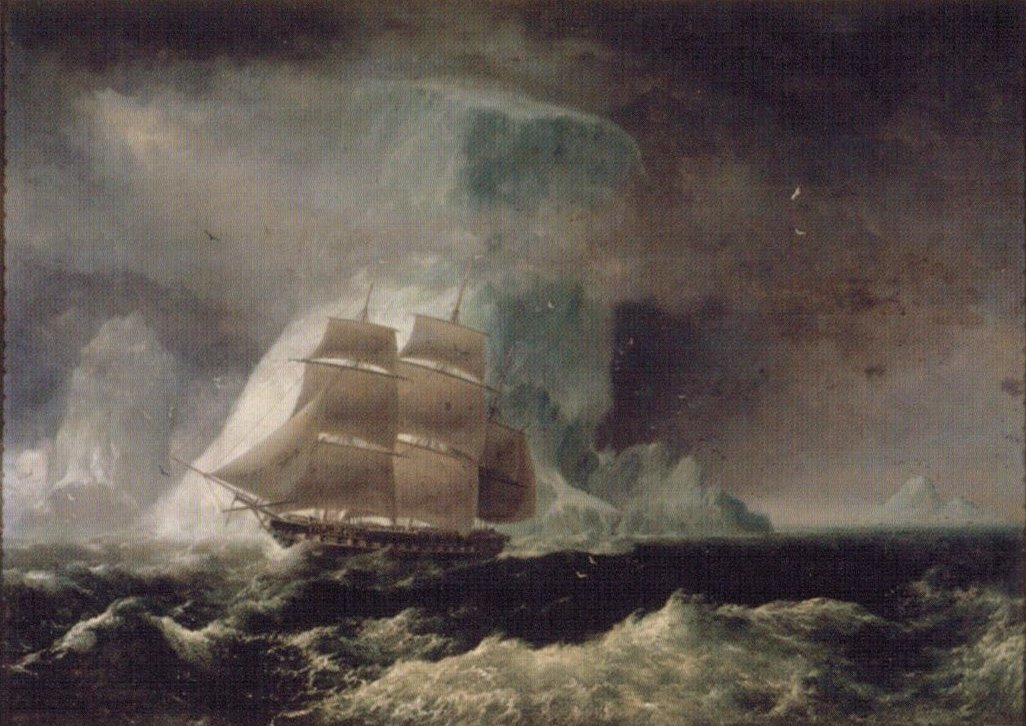
HMS Blonde, 1825

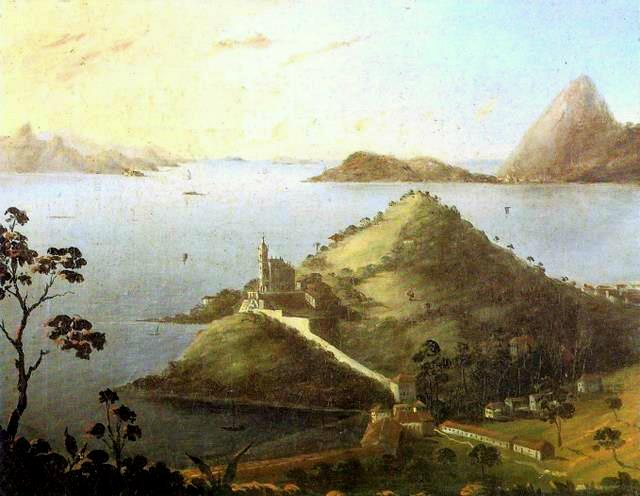
View of the entrance to Rio de Janeiro and Sugarloaf Mountain, 1824
